= Rules for Radicals =

1971 book by Saul Alinsky

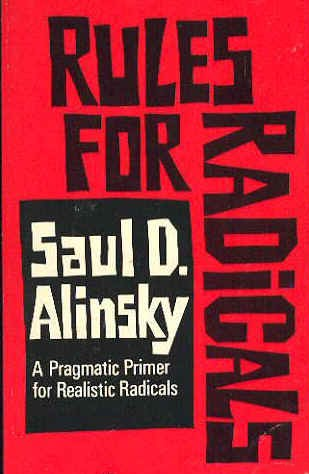
- Author: Saul Alinsky
- Cover artist: Dave Baker
- Language: English
- Subject: Grassroots, community organizing
- Publisher: Random House
- Publication date: 1971
- Publication place: United States
- Media type: Print (hard and paperback)
- Pages: 196 pp
- ISBN: 0-394-44341-1
- OCLC: 140535
- Dewey Decimal: 301.5
- LC Class: HN65 .A675

Rules for Radicals: A Pragmatic Primer for Realistic Radicals is a 1971 book by American community activist and writer Saul Alinsky about how to successfully run a movement for change. It was the last book written by Alinsky, and it was published shortly before his death in 1972. His goal was to create a guide for future community organizers, to use in uniting low-income communities, or "Have-Nots", in order for them to gain by any effective, non-violent means social, political, legal, environmental and economic wealth and power. Inside of it, Alinsky compiled the lessons he had learned throughout his experiences of community organizing from 1939 to 1971. He targeted these lessons at the current, new generation of radicals.

Divided into ten chapters, Rules for Radicals provides ten lessons on how a community organizer can accomplish the goal of successfully uniting people into an active grassroots organization with the power to affect change on a variety of issues. Though targeted at community organization, these chapters also touch on other issues that range from ethics, education, communication, and symbol construction and political philosophy.

Although it was published for the new generation of counterculture-era organizers in 1971, Alinsky's principles have been applied by numerous government, labor, community, and congregation-based organizations, and the main themes of his organizational methods have been recurring elements in political campaigns into the 21st century.

== Inspiration ==
The inspiration for Rules for Radicals was drawn from Alinsky's personal experience as a community organizer. It was also taken from the lessons he learned from his University of Chicago professor, Robert Park, who saw communities as "reflections of the larger processes of an urban society". The methods Alinsky developed and applied were described in his book as a guide on future community organizing for the new generation of radicals emerging from the 1960s.

Alinsky believed in collective action as a result of the work he did with the C.I.O. and the Institute for Juvenile Research in Chicago where he first began to develop his own, distinct method of community organizing. Additionally, his late work with the Citizens Action Program (CAP) provided some of his most developed practices in organizing through the empowerment of the poor. Alinsky saw community structure and the impoverished, together with the importance of their empowerment, as elements of community activism, and used both as tools to create powerful, active organizations. Also he used shared social problems as external antagonists to "heighten local awareness of similarities among residents and their shared differences with outsiders". This was one of Alinsky's most powerful tools in community organizing; to bring a collective together, he would bring to light an issue that would stir up conflict with some agency to unite the group. This provided an organization with a specific "villain" to confront and made direct action easier to implement. These tactics as a result of decades of organizing efforts, along with many other lessons, were poured into Rules for Radicals to create the guidebook for community organization.

On the 4th fly-leaf page, after a dedication to Alinsky's wife Irene and quotes from Rabbi Hillel and Thomas Paine, is the following text:

Lest we forget at least an over-the-shoulder acknowledgment to the very first radical: from all our legends, mythology, and history (and who is to know where mythology leaves off and history begins— or which is which), the first radical known to man who rebelled against the establishment and did it so effectively that he at least won his own kingdom — Lucifer

On the academic side, Alinsky quotes Tocqueville more than any other writer in both Reveille for Radicals and Rules for Radicals. He uses and descends from Tocqueville both in his conceptualization of freedom and equality in his focus on the importance of the middle class, quoting Tocqueville himself to define it: the "have a little, want some more class."

== Themes ==
Rules for Radicals has various themes. Among them is his use of symbol construction to strengthen the unity within an organization. He would draw on loyalty to a particular church or religious affiliation to create a structured organization with which to operate, the reason being that symbols by which communities could identify themselves created structured organizations that were easier to mobilize in implementing direct action. Once the community was united behind a common symbol, Alinsky would find a common enemy for the community to be united against.

The use of common enemy against a community was another theme of Rules for Radicals, as a uniting element in communities.

Alinsky would find an external antagonist to turn into a "common enemy" for the community within which he was operating. Often, this would be a local politician or agency that had some involvement with activity concerning the community. Once the enemy was established, the community would come together in opposition of it. This management of conflict heightened awareness within the community as to the similarities its members shared as well as what differentiated them from those outside of their organization. The use of conflict also allowed for the goal of the group to be clearly defined. With an established external antagonist, the community's goal would be to defeat that enemy.

Symbol construction helped to promote structured organization, which allowed for nonviolent conflict through another element in Alinsky's teaching, direct action. Direct action created conflict situations that further established the unity of the community and promoted the accomplishment of achieving the community's goal of defeating their common enemy. It also brought issues the community was battling to the public eye. Alinsky encouraged over-the-top public demonstrations throughout Rules for Radicals that could not be ignored, and these tactics enabled his organization to progress their goals faster than through normal bureaucratic processes.

Lastly, the main theme throughout Rules for Radicals and Alinsky's work was empowerment of the poor. Alinsky used symbol construction and nonviolent conflict to create a structured organization with a clearly defined goal that could take direct action against a common enemy. At this point, Alinsky would withdraw from the organization to allow their progress to be powered by the community itself. This empowered the organizations to create change.

=== The Rules ===
1. "Power is not only what you have but what the enemy thinks you have."
2. "Never go outside the experience of your people."
3. "Whenever possible go outside of the experience of the enemy."
4. "Make the enemy live up to its own book of rules."
5. "Ridicule is man's most potent weapon. There is no defense. It is almost impossible to counterattack ridicule. Also it infuriates the opposition, who then react to your advantage."
6. "A good tactic is one your people enjoy."
7. "A tactic that drags on too long becomes a drag."
8. "Keep the pressure on."
9. "The threat is usually more terrifying than the thing itself."
10. "The major premise for tactics is the development of operations that will maintain a constant pressure upon the opposition."
11. "If you push a negative hard and deep enough it will break through into its counterside; this is based on the principle that every positive has its negative."
12. "The price of a successful attack is a constructive alternative."
13. "Pick the target, freeze it, personalize it, and polarize it."

== Criticism ==
Alinsky received criticism for the methods and ideas he presented. Robert Pruger and Harry Specht observed that much of his instruction has only been effective in urban, low-income areas. The authors also criticized Alinsky's broad statement that Rules for Radicals is a tool for organizing all low-income people. Further, Alinsky's use of artificially stimulated conflict has been criticized for its ineffectiveness in areas that thrive on unity. According to Judith Ann Trolander, in several Chicago areas in which he worked, his use of conflict backfired and the community was unable to achieve the policy adjustments they were seeking.

Pruger and Specht also questioned the philosophy of community organization found in Rules for Radicals as overly ideological. Alinsky believed in allowing the community to determine its exact goal. He would produce an enemy for them to conflict with, but the purpose of the conflict was ultimately left up to the community. Pruger and Specht criticized this idea due to the conflicting opinions that can often be present within a group. They viewed Alinsky's belief that an organization can create a goal to accomplish as highly optimistic and contradictory to his creation of an external antagonist. By producing a common enemy, Alinsky is creating a goal for the community: the defeat of that enemy. To say that the community will create their own goal seemed backwards to them considering Alinsky creates the goal of defeating the enemy. Thus, his belief can be seen as too ideological and contradictory because the organization may turn the goal of defeating the common enemy he produced into their main purpose.

Alinsky-style organizing has also been criticized by Susan Stall and Randy Stoecker as ineffective, and even destructive, to communities and public perceptions of community organizing for its:

1. Hardened focus upon the expertise of an outsider who views communities as muddled sheep waiting to be organized (and not capable groups with existing social-psychological networks and ties),
2. Gendered authoritarianism that fetishizes conflict as panacea, which evaluates feminist perspectives as irrelevant, and
3. An overly simplistic focus on perceptions of power.

Stall and Stoecker describe these issues between the public and private split in community organizing, and gendered organizing tactics as the difference between community organizing (Alinsky/masculinist) and organizing community (feminist).

== Legacy ==
The scope of influence for Rules for Radicals is a far-reaching one as it is a compilation of the tactics of Alinsky. It has been influential for policymaking and organization for various communities and agency groups, and has influenced politicians and activists educated by Alinsky and the Industrial Areas Foundation (IAF), and other grassroots movements.

=== Direct impact ===
After Alinsky died in California in 1972, his influence helped spawn other organizations and policy changes. Rules for Radicals was a direct influence that helped to form the United Neighborhood Organization in the early 1980s. Its founders Greg Galluzzo, Mary Gonzales, and Pater Martinez were all students of Alinsky. The work of UNO helped to improve the hygiene, sanitation, and education in southeastern Chicago. Additionally, the founders of Organization of the North East in Chicago during the 1970s applied Alinsky's principles to organize multiethnic neighborhoods in order to gain greater political representation.

Rules for Radicals have been dispersed by Alinsky's students who undertook their own community organizing endeavors. Students of Alinsky's such as Edward T. Chambers used Rules for Radicals to help form the IAF, the Queens Citizens Organization, and the Communities Organized for Public Service. Another student of Alinsky's, Ernesto Cortes, rose to prominence in the late 1970s in San Antonio while organizing Hispanic neighborhoods. His use of congregation-based organizing received much acclaim as a popular method of Alinsky's by utilizing "preexisting solidary neighborhood elements, especially church groups, so that the constituent units are organizations, not individuals." This congregation-based organizing and symbol construction was taught to him by Edward Chambers and the IAF during his time studying under both.

The methods and teachings of Rules for Radicals have also been linked to the Mid-America Institute, the National People's Action, the National Training and Information Center, the Pacific Institute for Community Organizations, and the Community Service Organization.

=== Later influence ===
The methods from Rules for Radicals have been seen in modern American politics. The use of congregation-based organizing has been linked to Jesse Jackson when he was organizing his own political campaign. The book was disseminated by the Tea Party conservative group FreedomWorks during Dick Armey's tenure as chairman. Hillary Clinton wrote her college thesis regarding Alinsky's mobilizing model but found the strategies of only limited use to the conflicts of the time. The book also informed the rhetorical strategy of the white supremacist Andrew Anglin.

== Publication data ==
- Rules for Radicals: A Pragmatic Primer for Realistic Radicals (1971) Random House, ISBN 0394443411 (hard cover); (1971) Vintage Books and Random House of Canada Limited, ISBN 0679721134 (paperback); (2015) Brilliance Audio, ASIN B0118ACFL2 (unabridged audiobook, read by Scott Lange)
