= Community organizing =

Process where a community works together based on a common problem

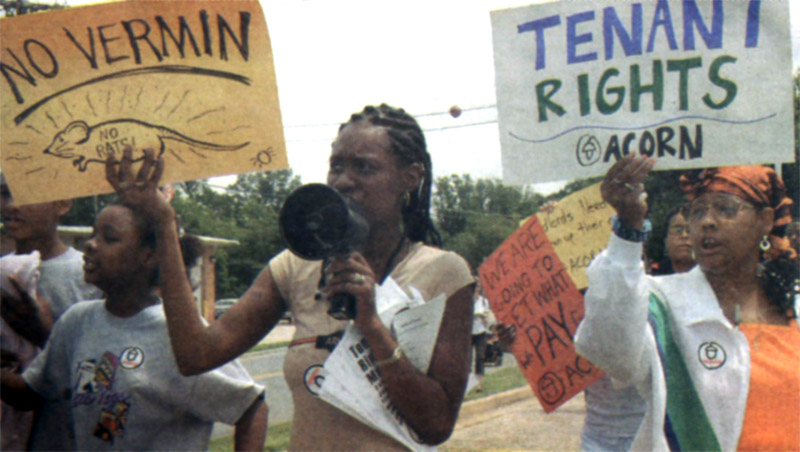
Association of Community Organizations for Reform Now protest (Richir)

Community organizing is a process where people who live in proximity to each other or share some common problem come together into an organization that acts in their shared self-interest. Unlike those who promote consensus-based community building, community organizers generally assume that social change necessarily involves conflict and social struggle in order to generate collective power for the powerless. Community organizing has as a core goal the generation of durable power for an organization representing the community, allowing it to influence key decision-makers on a range of issues over time. In the ideal, for example, this can get community-organizing groups a place at the table before important decisions are made. Community organizers work with and develop new local leaders, facilitating coalitions and assisting in the development of campaigns. A central goal of organizing is the development of a robust, organized, local democracy bringing community members together across differences to fight together for the interests of the community.

== Types of community organizing ==
Community organizers attempt to influence government, corporations, and institutions, increase direct representation within decision-making bodies, and foster general social reform more generally. Where negotiations fail, these organizations quickly seek to inform others outside of the organization of the issues being addressed and expose or pressure the decision-makers through a variety of means, including picketing, boycotting, sit-ins, petitioning, and electoral politics. Organizing groups often seek out issues they know will generate controversy and conflict. This allows them to draw in and educate participants, build commitment, and establish a reputation for advancing local justice.

Community organizers generally seek to build groups that are democratic in governance, open and accessible to community members, and concerned with the general health of a specific interest group, rather than the community as a whole. In addition, community organizing seeks to broadly empower community members, through mobilizing efforts, with the end goal of "distributing" power and resources more equally between the community members and external political and social figures of power. When adapting the goal of community empowerment, organizers recognize the uneven distribution of material and social resources within society as the root cause of the community's issues. The process of creating empowerment starts with admitting that power gaps and resource inequalities exist in society and affects an individual's personal life. Though community organizers share the goal of community empowerment, community organizing itself is defined and understood in a variety ways. There are different approaches to community organizing. These include:

- Feminist organizing. However, feminist organizing can sometimes lean away from the conflictual vision of organizing to the point that it may not belong in the same category.
- Faith-based community organizing (FBCO) which brings together religious institutions. The Industrial Areas Foundation (IAF) under Edward T. Chambers (deeply informed by the work of Ernesto Cortes and developed through a document originally drafted by Dick Harmon) was the classic early example of this. The IAF as well as the Gamaliel Foundation, Faith in Action, and the Direct Action and Research Training Center are or were national or regional umbrella groups organized at one point around this approach.
- Broad-based organizing, which emerged from FBCO, reflecting the inclusion of a broader range of institutions and groups beyond religious ones. Parts of the IAF were early movers in this direction.
- A range of forms of neighborhood-based organizing that either organizes individuals or creates new "from scratch" kinds of organizations. This can include:
  - Doorknocking, where organizers go door to door and draw individuals into an organization. ACORN is a key example of an organization using this approach.
  - Block-club organizing, where blocks (two sides of a street on a block) are organized into a club or sometimes tenants in a building are organized. Tom Gaudette and Shel Trapp were very involved in developing this approach. Generally the block-club model also includes higher level forms of organization (street clubs, larger areas) because block clubs alone were felt not to form a strong foundation for organizing. Organization for a Better Austin and the Chatham-Avalon Park Community Council in Chicago and many of the organizations developed by Shel Trapp for National People's Action, including those in Cleveland, were good examples.
  - House meetings, where a series of house meetings are held in a community, leading to a community congress to form an organization. This approach was developed by Fred Ross. The Community Service Organization (CSO) was a good example, and a similar approach was used by the Cesar Chavez (who was an organizer in the CSO) in the United Farm Workers.
  - An "Organic" approach, where problems are located across a particular community and then people are organized around these problems locally, and then leaders are brought together in a larger organization. The Northwest Community Organization in Chicago, developed by Tom Gaudette and the early (and to some extent current) Iowa Citizens for Community Improvement were examples of this approach
  - Coalition building. National Peoples Action was a good example of this (now called People's Action).

Because of its focus on "local" issues and relationships between members, individual groups generally prioritize relatively local community interests by focusing on local issues. There has been an attempt to build a general community organizing practice model that ties the different types of community organizing together despite their differences. Scholars Shane R. Brady and Mary Katherine O'Connor construct a starting point for a general practice model, a model that defines community organizing as its own field of practice; however, this model depends on existing practice models adapted by the different types of community organizing. For example, FBCOs and many grassroots organizing models use the "social action approach", which is built on the work of Saul Alinsky from the 1930s into the 1970s. By contrast, feminist organizing follows a "community-building approach," which emphasizes raising consciousness to support the community's empowerment.

=== Grassroots action ===
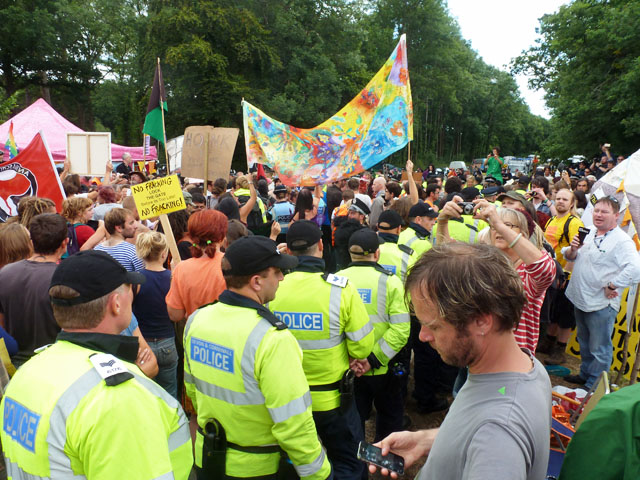
Balcombe drilling protest

Grassroots organizing is distinctive for its bottom-up approach to organizing. Grassroots organizers are oftentimes members of the community, working to organize power collectively, rather than hierarchically. This type of organizing uses a process where people collectively act in the interest of their communities and the common good. According to scholar Brian D. Christens, grassroots organizing focuses on building and maintaining interpersonal relationships between their community members. Building social relationships allow community members to enhance both their collaborative and deliberative skills, to better handle conflict, and to strengthen civil engagement. Some networks of community organizations that employ this method and support local organizing groups include National People's Action and ACORN. Although efforts in grassroots organizing are significant in marginalized communities, it is specifically popular among marginalized communities of color.

"Door-knocking" grassroots organizations like ACORN organize poor and working-class members recruiting members one by one in the community. Because they go door-to-door, they are able to reach beyond established organizations and the "churched" to bring together a wide range of less privileged people. FBCOs have tended to organize more middle-class people, because their institutional membership is generally drawn from the mainline denominations. ACORN tends to stress the importance of constant action to maintain the commitment of a less rooted group of participants. ACORN and other neighborhood-based groups like the Organization for a Better Austin had a reputation of being more forceful than faith-based (FBCO) groups, in part because they needed to continually act to keep their non-institutionalized members engaged, and there are indications that their local groups were more staff directed than volunteer directed. However, the same can be said for many forms of organizing, including FBCOs. The "door-knocking" approach is more time-intensive than the "organization of organizations" approach of FBCOs and requires more organizers who, partly as a result, can be lower paid with more turnover. Unlike the existing FBCO national "umbrella" and other grassroots organizations, ACORN maintains a centralized national agenda and exerts some centralized control over local organizations. Because ACORN USA was a 501(c)4 organization under the tax code, it was able to participate directly in election activities, but contributions to it were not tax-exempt.

==== Limitations to grassroots organizing ====
Grassroots organizing is vulnerable, being dependent on the support of more powerful people; its goals can be easily thwarted. Because grassroots organizing focuses on building relationships within the community, scholars note that grassroots community organizing can be passive and depoliticizing. This approach to building community empowerment does not aim for a specific political or social goal. In other words, building relationships do not always directly confront institutions, though it might challenge an individual's views through one-on-one conversations with other individuals in the community.

=== Feminist community organizing ===
Feminist community organizing is a specific subset of social change work that centers around communal relationship building rather than just the acquisition of power. Gender structures are not neutral within social movements. Historically, men have been assigned to the higher, more visible aspects of movements, such as negotiating, due to the sexual division of labor carrying over into social movements. Because women have historically been behind the scenes during social movements, performing a kind of ‘invisible’ grassroots work, the importance of community organizing has only recently begun to be recognized.

Feminist community organizing emphasizes an intersectional approach, aiming to empower the voices of those who have been historically marginalized, and recognizing that oppression often persists across multiple identities, creating intersecting forms of oppression. To take an intersectional approach, organizers pay special attention to the interactions of oppression among lines of gender, race, class, and other identities. This approach allows feminist community organizing to honor a much more diverse group of voices, oftentimes giving a spot to those who have been historically left out of these important conversations.

Feminist community organizing addresses a diverse set of issues, including but not limited to: sexual assault, reproductive justice, socioeconomic equality and welfare rights, and general structural and systemic inequalities. Organizers employ methods such as collective consciousness raising, which prioritizes raising consciousness for women to better understand how their personal struggles are interconnected with societal inequalities. While women have participated in grassroots organizing, the characteristics of feminism distinguish feminist organizing from other forms of grassroots organizing.

==== Community-building in feminist organizing ====
Feminists want to break down racial and gendered boundaries and promote unity among women. Feminist organizing focuses on building relationships within the community, seeing such relationships as a prerequisite for raising consciousness. This type of organizing is called the community-building approach, which is the opposite of the social action, or Alinsky model, which centers around the acquisition of power and the construction of community as a battle in the public sphere between the "haves" and "have nots". The community-building approach depends on the participation and collaboration of both community organizers and community members. Thus attempting to eliminate the power differential between organizers and participants. Therefore, the community-building approach centers around the belief that power rests in the community and community empowerment is the process of building that power.

Scholars Catherine P. Bradshaw et al. states that feminist organizers believe power is not quantifiable, and that power is created, rather than distributed. The hierarchical relationship between organizer and participant is also broken down by facilitating decision-making among community members, empowering them to have a voice rather than just relying on the input of community leaders. To build relationships among community members, feminist organizers encourage sharing personal experiences. Feminist organizers believe that this forms a sense of interconnectedness and trust among community members which they believe is vital to the community organizing process. The shift to community building was also caused by external forces, rather than just feminist organizer's motivations, such as during the 1980s, where the rising neoliberal agenda caused many community organizers to shift to the community-building approach.

==== Black feminist organizing in the United States ====
With the rise of neoliberalism, many growing post-industrial cities imposed policies that focused on individual needs rather than community ones. Alongside this de-prioritizing of the community's welfare, policies also prioritized capital over laborers and mass accumulation over redistribution. The implications of these policies directly impacted some of the most vulnerable communities, with single Black mothers being especially affected. The dismantling of social safety nets created a problem that Black Feminist organizers sought to fix.

Black Feminist organizers utilize the concept of “Oppositional Knowledge” as a tool for both resistance and resilience. Oppositional knowledge is a grassroots form of knowledge accumulation that works to accumulate and disseminate knowledge from the bottom up rather than from the top down. This anti-hierarchical form of knowledge collection is used to synthesize knowledge across a specific geographic region to empower and validate the decision-making autonomy of vulnerable individuals.

Alongside the prioritization of the accumulation of oppositional knowledge, Black Feminist organizers in the United States have a core set of principles from which they operate. These principles include issues like: high quality and affordable/free education, fair and safe labor practices and opportunities, affordable and safe housing, and clean and safe communities with access to high quality services. These principles define Black Feminist organizing in the US, but its scope is not limited to just these issues.

Within Black Feminist organizing, there is a diaspora of backgrounds and viewpoints that Black Feminist community organizing aims to center in its approach to activism. This diversity of views helps to mitigate secondary marginalization that occurs in these spaces and further strengthens the impact of the movement.

==== Black feminist organizing in Latin America and the Caribbean ====
In Latin America and the Caribbean, there are three main forms of community organizing employed by Black Women activists. These include the liberal model, the decolonial model, and the hybrid model. The liberal model is more reform-oriented, aiming to expand the inclusion of Afro-descendant women into state policies and systems. They tend to add the issues that affect Black women to broader civil demands, rather than advocating for them on their own. Organizations that employ this model of community organizing are much more likely to have legal recognition and resources due to their conformity to reform rather than revolution. The Decolonial model, on the other hand, tends to be much more revolutionary in nature, attempting to deconstruct and challenge the notions of colonialism. Due to this, these groups often face a lack of resources and/or legal recognition. The Decolonial method focuses on self-government and autonomy, and as a result, they often have extensive efforts around political education and narrative building alongside their community-building efforts. Finally, many organizers end up employing a hybrid model, which incorporates elements from both the liberal and decolonial models in order to fit their needs for advocacy.

===== Critiques of white centered organizing in the United States, Latin America, and the Caribbean =====
In Latin America, narratives of feminism are often associated with white-mestizo feminism. This narrative is not limited to Latin America and the Caribbean, however. There have been extensive critiques of Feminism in the US as being white-centered, Eurocentric, and ignoring intersectional realities and struggles. Oftentimes, as a result of the whiteness of mainstream feminism, Black women face racism when working with these groups, and oftentimes their needs are deprioritized or not acknowledged. As a result of this, many Black women do not feel that feminist spaces are truly safe for them to address their fundamental concerns. This causes a disconnect between women organizers, where many Black Female organizers do not position themselves as aligned with the feminist movement, even though they are all united in the feminist goal of achieving political, economic, and social equity.

When attempting to organize in all-Black non-gendered groups, many Black women also face sexism. This creates a lose-lose situation in which they face oppression wherever they go, highlighting the intersectional nature of their oppression. This intersection of oppression has created a need for Black women-led spaces for community organizing. In the US, this is evident in the creation of the National Association of Colored Women (NACW) in 1896. This was created in response to the continued exclusion and dismissal from other social movements at the time. The need for Black women-centered feminist community organizing in the United States can be seen through the array of Black Feminist led movements that continue today, such as the NACW and the Black Women Radicals.

==== Limitations to feminist organizing ====
Some feminists argue that feminist community organizing can disregard the racial and capability diversity among women. In the process of pushing for unity among women, feminist organizers are inclined to disregard the benefits of diversity. Economist Marilyn Power uses the term "homogenous category" to highlight the problem of masking racial diversity, while sociologist Akwugo Emejulu uses the concept of essentialism (reducing women to their gender stereotypes) to highlight the capabilities limitation. Though feminist organizers' intentions are to recognize women's diversity through unity, some are concerned that the vision of unity eclipses a diverse reality.

There are studies that speculate that these limitations are caused by feminism's emergence from a Eurocentric perspective. Historically, European American feminists delegitimize the racial difference of women. In addition, European American feminists delegitimize women who do not follow the traditional gender norms influenced by white domestic middle class womanhood. Currently, feminist organizing focuses on addressing gender inequalities, which means only the problems of women who follow and are impacted by gender norms will be addressed. Feminist organizing becomes counterproductive for those who do follow gender norms. Psychologist Lorraine Gutierrez claims that feminist organizing disregards problems that are larger than the scope of gender norms. This negatively impacts women empowerment because it is the diversity that motivates women to mobilize.

=== Faith-based ===
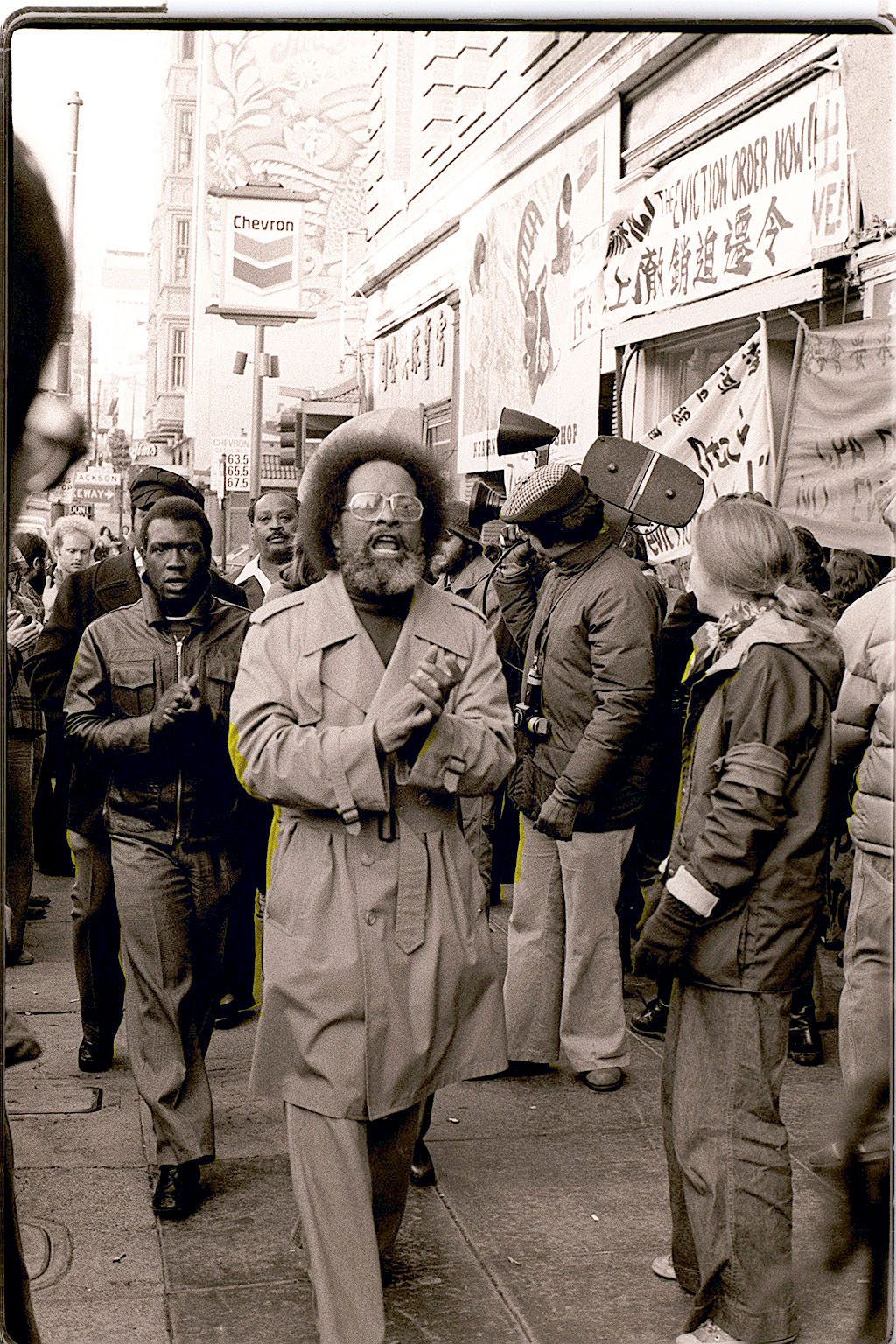
Cecil Williams at the I Hotel protest, January 1977

Faith-based community organizing (FBCO), also known as Congregation-based Community Organizing, is a methodology for developing power and relationships throughout a community of institutions: today mostly congregations, but these can also include unions, neighborhood associations, and other groups. Progressive and centrist FBCO organizations unite around basic values derived from common aspects of their faith instead of around strict dogmas. There are now at least 180 FBCOs in the US as well as in South Africa, England, Germany, and other nations. Local FBCO organizations are often linked through organizing networks such as the Industrial Areas Foundation, Gamaliel Foundation, PICO National Network, and Direct Action and Research Training Center (DART). In the United States starting in 2001, the Bush administration launched a department to promote community organizing that included faith-based organizing as well other community groups.

FBCOs tend to have mostly middle-class participants because the congregations involved are generally mainline Protestant and Catholic (although "middle-class" can mean different things in white communities and communities of color, which can lead to class tensions within these organizations). Holiness, Pentecostal, and other related denominations (often "storefront") churches with mostly poor and working-class members tend not to join FBCOs because of their focus on "faith" over "works," among other issues. FBCOs have increasingly expanded outside impoverished areas into churches where middle-class professionals predominate in an effort to expand their power to contest inequality.

Because of their "organization of organizations" approach, FBCOs can organize large numbers of members with a relatively small number of organizers that generally are better paid and more professionalized than those in "door-knocking" groups like ACORN. FBCOs focus on the long-term development of a culture and common language of organizing and on the development of relational ties between members. They are more stable during fallow periods than grassroots groups because of the continuing existence of member churches. FBCOs are 501(c)3 organizations. Contributions to them are tax exempt. As a result, while they can conduct campaigns over "issues" they cannot promote the election of specific individuals.

==== Faith-based community and digital transformation ====
The way in which faith based communities FBCOs organize has undergone a dramatic change with the introduction of digital technology. In Digitally Enabled Social Change: Activism in the Internet Age, authors Earl and Kimport (2011) provide valuable insights into this shift – namely how decreased costs associated with "Taking Action on the Cheap" have opened up greater opportunities for involvement in religious initiatives or movements. Digital tools allow faith based groups to spread their message further, better coordinate collective actions across distances and mobilize supporters in unprecedented ways – greatly democratizing this kind of organizing effort. However, this transition to digital also poses complex challenges that must be addressed on topics such as community identity and collective action – as noted by Earl and Kimport themselves in their book.

=== Broad-based ===
Broad-based organizations intentionally recruit member institutions that are both secular and religious. Congregations, synagogues, temples and mosques are joined by public schools, non-profits, and labor and professional associations. Organizations of the Industrial Areas Foundation are explicitly broad-based and dues-based. Dues-based membership allows IAF organizations to maintain their independence; organizations are politically non-partisan and do not pursue or accept government funding. Broad-based organizations aim to teach institutional leaders how to build relationships of trust across racial, faith, economic and geographic lines through individual, face-to-face meetings. Other goals include internally strengthening the member institutions by developing the skills and capacities of their leaders and creating a vehicle for ordinary families to participate in the political process. The Industrial Areas Foundation sees itself as a "university of public life" teaching citizens the democratic process in the fullest sense.

=== Power versus protest ===
While community organizing groups often engage in protest actions designed to force powerful groups to respond to their demands, protest is only one aspect of the activity of organizing groups. To the extent that groups' actions generate a sense in the larger community that they have "power," they are often able to engage with and influence powerful groups through dialogue, backed up by a history of successful protest-based campaigns. Similar to the way unions gain recognition as the representatives of workers for a particular business, community organizing groups can gain recognition as key representatives of particular communities. In this way, representatives of community organizing groups are often able to bring key government officials or corporate leaders to the table without engaging in "actions" because of their reputation. As Alinsky said, "the first rule of power tactics" is that "power is not only what you have but what the enemy thinks you have." The development of durable "power" and influence is a key aim of community organizing.

"Rights-based" community organizing, in which municipal governments are used to exercise community power, was first experimented with by the Community Environmental Legal Defense Fund (CELDF.org) in Pennsylvania, beginning in 2002. Community groups are organized to influence municipal governments to enact local ordinances. These ordinances challenge preemptive state and federal laws that forbid local governments from prohibiting corporate activities deemed harmful by community residents. The ordinances are drafted specifically to assert the rights of "human and natural communities," and include provisions that deny the legal concepts of "corporate personhood" and "corporate rights". Since 2006, they have been drafted to include the recognition of legally enforceable rights for "natural communities and ecosystems".

Although this type of community organizing focuses on the adoption of local laws, the intent is to demonstrate the use of governing authority to protect community rights and expose the misuse of governing authority to benefit corporations. As such, the adoption of rights-based municipal ordinances is not a legal strategy, but an organizing strategy. Courts predictably deny the legal authority of municipalities to legislate in defiance of state and federal law. Corporations and government agencies that initiate legal actions to overturn these ordinances have been forced to argue in opposition to the community's right to make governing decisions on issues with harmful and direct local impact.

The first rights-based municipal laws prohibited corporations from monopolizing horticulture (factory farming), and banned corporate waste dumping within municipal jurisdictions. More recent rights-based organizing, in Pennsylvania, New Hampshire, Maine, Virginia and California has prohibited corporate mining, large-scale water withdrawals and chemical trespass. A similar attempt was made by Denton, Texas to restrict fracking was initially successful, but then overturned and further legislation passed to prevent Texas communities from enacting similar bans.

=== Political orientations ===
Community organizing is not solely the domain of progressive politics, as dozens of fundamentalist organizations are in operation, such as the Christian Coalition. However, the term "community organizing" generally refers to more progressive organizations, as evidenced, for example, by the reaction against community organizing in the 2008 US presidential election by Republicans and conservatives both online and offline.

=== Fundraising ===
Organizing groups often struggle to find resources. They rarely receive funding from government since their activities often seek to contest government policies. Foundations and others who usually fund service activities generally do not understand what organizing groups do or how they do it, or shy away from their contentious approaches. The constituency of progressive and centrist organizing groups is largely low- or middle- income, so they are generally unable to support themselves through dues. In search of resources, some organizing groups have accepted funding for direct service activities in the past. As noted below, this has frequently led these groups to drop their conflictual organizing activities, in part because these threatened funding for their "service" arms.

Recent studies have shown, however, that funding for community organizing can produce large returns on investment ($512 in community benefits to $1 of Needmor funding, according to the Needmor Fund Study, $157 to 1 in New Mexico and $89 to 1 in North Carolina according to National Committee for Responsive Philanthropy studies) through legislation and agreements with corporations, among other sources, not including non-fiscal accomplishments.

== What community organizing is not ==
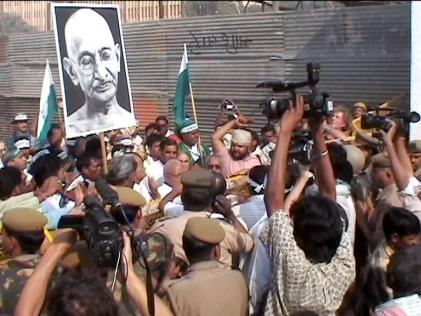
Janadesh 2007 protesters seeking land rights

Understanding what community organizing is can be aided by understanding what it is not from the perspective of community organizers.

- Activism: According to Edward Chambers, community organizing is distinguishable from activism if activists engage in social protest without a coherent strategy for building power or for making specific social changes.
- Mobilizing: When people "mobilize", they get together to effect a specific social change but have no long-term plan. When the particular campaign that mobilized them is over, these groups dissolve and durable power is not built.
- Advocacy: Advocates generally speak for others who are deemed (often incorrectly) unable to represent their own interests due to disability, inherent complexity of the venue such as courts and hospitals, or other factors. Community organizing emphasizes the virtue of having those affected to speak for themselves.
- Social movement building: A broad social movement often encompasses diverse collections of individual activists, local and national organizations, advocacy groups, multiple and often conflicting spokespersons, and more, held together by relatively common aims but not a common organizational structure. A community organizing group might be part of a "movement." Movements generally dissolve when the motivating issue(s) are addressed, although organizations created during movements can continue and shift their focuses.
- Legal action: Lawyers are often quite important to those engaged in social action. The problem comes when a social action strategy is designed primarily around a lawsuit. When lawyers take the center stage, it can push grassroots struggle into the background, short circuiting the development of collective power and capacity. There are examples where community organizing groups and legal strategies have worked together well, however, including the Williams v. California lawsuit over inequality in k-12 education.
- Direct service: Americans today often equate civic engagement with direct service. Organizing groups usually avoid actually providing services, today, however, because history indicates that when they do, organizing for collective power is often left behind. Powerful groups often threaten the "service" wings of organizing groups in an effort to prevent collective action. In the nonprofit sector, there are many organizations that used to do community organizing but lost this focus in the shift to service.
- Community development: Consensual community development efforts to improve communities through a range of strategies, usually directed by educated professionals working in government, policy, non-profit, or business organizations, is not community organizing. Community development projects increasingly include a community participation component, and often seek to empower residents of impoverished areas with skills for collaboration and job training, among others. However, community development generally assumes that groups and individuals can work together collaboratively without significant conflict or struggles over power to solve community challenges. One currently popular form is asset-based community development that seeks out existing community strengths. The relationship between community organizing and community development is however more one of nuance than total difference. There is much community development literature and practice which is very similar to community organizing, see for example the international Community Development Journal. And certainly since the 1970s community development practitioners have been influenced by structural analyses of inequity and power distribution.
- Nonpartisan dialogues about community problems: A range of efforts create opportunities for people to meet together and engage in dialogue about community problems. Like community organizing, the effort in contexts like these is generally to be open to a diverse range of opinions, out of which some consensus may be reached. A study circle is an example. However, beyond the dialogue that also happens inside organizing groups, the focus is on generating a collective and singular "voice" in order to gain power and resources for the organization's members as well as constituents in the broader community.
- Power gained and exerted in community organizing is also not the coercion applied by legal, illegal, physical, or economic means, such as those be applied by banks, syndicates, corporations, governments, or other institutions. Rather, organizing makes use of the voluntary efforts of a community's members acting jointly to achieve an economic or other benefit. As opposed to commercial ventures, gains that result from community organizing automatically accrue to persons in similar circumstances who are not necessarily members, e.g. residents in a geographic area or in a similar socioeconomic status, or persons having conditions or circumstances in common who benefit from gains won by the organizing effort. This may include workers who benefit from a campaign affecting their industry, for example, or persons with disabilities who benefit from gains made in their legal or economic eligibility or status.

== History in the United States ==
Robert Fisher and Peter Romanofsky have grouped the history of "community organizing" (also known as "social agitation") in the United States into four rough periods:

=== 1880 to 1900 ===
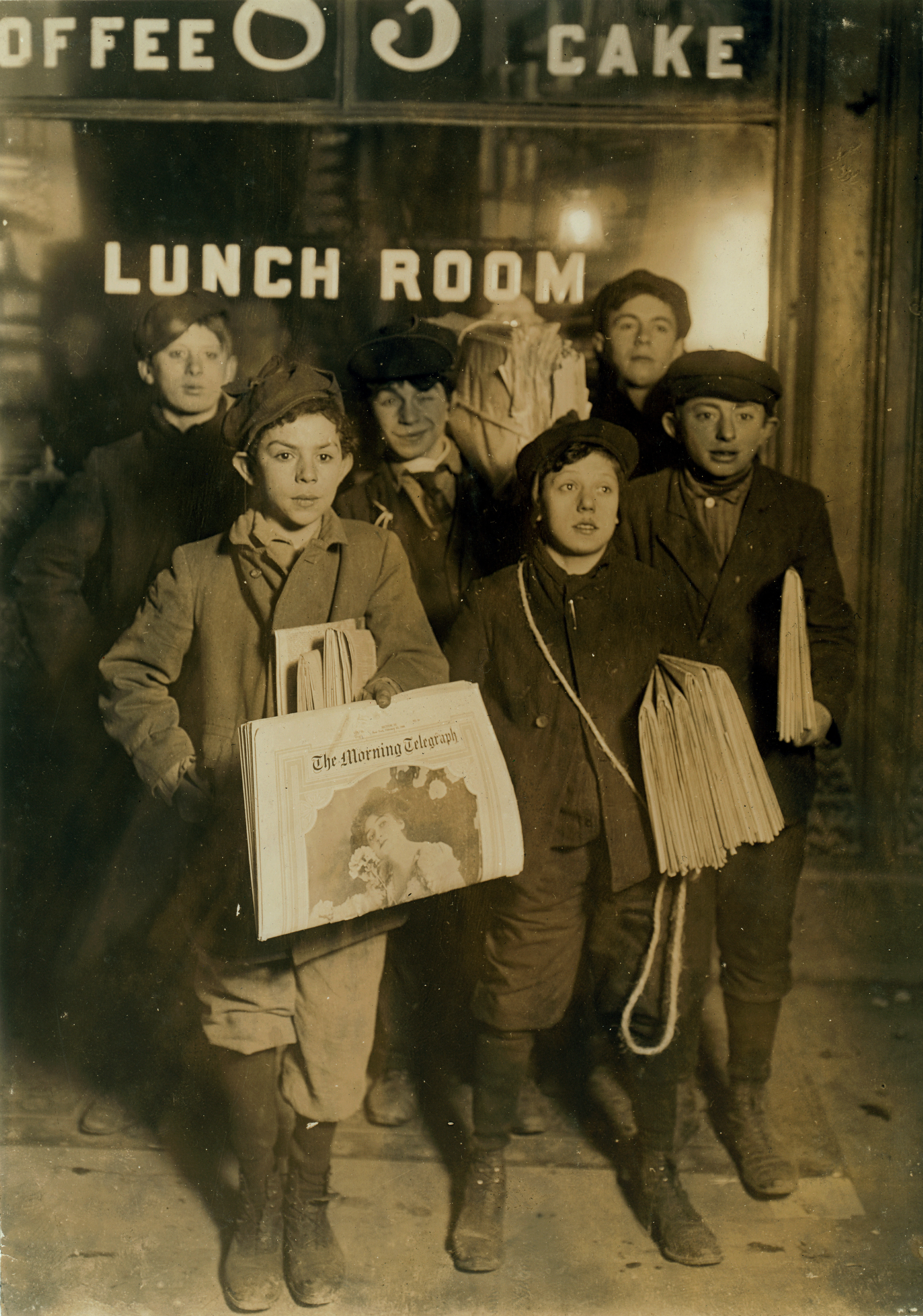
23 February 1908 Boys Selling Newspapers on Brooklyn Bridge

People sought to meet the pressures of rapid immigration and industrialization by organizing immigrant neighborhoods in urban centers. Since the emphasis of the reformers was mostly on building community through settlement houses and other service mechanisms, the dominant approach was what Fisher calls social work. During this period the Newsboys Strike of 1899 provided an early model of youth-led organizing.

=== 1900 to 1940 ===
During this period, much of community organizing methodology was generated in schools of social work, with a particular methodological focus grounded in the philosophy of John Dewey, which focused on experience, education, and other sociological concepts. This period saw much energy coming from those critical of capitalist doctrines as well. Studs Terkel documented community organizing in the depression era, such as that of Dorothy Day. Most organizations had a national orientation because the economic problems the nation faced did not seem possible to change at the neighborhood levels.

=== 1940 to 1960 ===
Saul Alinsky, based in Chicago, is credited with originating the term community organizer during this time period. Alinsky wrote Reveille for Radicals, published in 1946, and Rules for Radicals, published in 1971. With these books, Alinsky was the first person in America to codify key strategies and aims of community organizing.

The following excerpts from Reveille for Radicals give a sense of Alinsky's organizing philosophy and of his style of public engagement:

- A People's Organization is a conflict group, [and] this must be openly and fully recognized. Its sole reason in coming into being is to wage war against all evils which cause suffering and unhappiness. A People's Organization is the banding together of large numbers of men and women to fight for those rights which insure a decent way of life....

- A People's Organization is dedicated to an eternal war. It is a war against poverty, misery, delinquency, disease, injustice, hopelessness, despair, and unhappiness. They are basically the same issues for which nations have gone to war in almost every generation.... War is not an intellectual debate, and in the war against social evils there are no rules of fair play....

- A People's Organization lives in a world of hard reality. It lives in the midst of smashing forces, dashing struggles, sweeping cross-currents, ripping passions, conflict, confusion, seeming chaos, the hot and the cold, the squalor and the drama, which people prosaically refer to as life and students describe as "society."

In 1940, with the support of Roman Catholic Bishop Bernard James Sheil and Chicago Sun-Times publisher Marshall Field, Alinsky founded the Industrial Areas Foundation (IAF). The mandate of the national community organizing network was to partner with religious congregations and civic organizations to build "broad-based organizations" that could train up local leadership and promote trust across community divides.

After Alinsky died in 1972, Edward T. Chambers became the IAF's executive director. Hundreds of professional community and labor organizers and thousands of community and labor leaders have been trained at its workshops. Fred Ross, who worked for Alinsky, was the principal mentor for Cesar Chavez and Dolores Huerta. Other organizations following in the tradition of the Congregation-based Community Organizing pioneered by IAF include PICO National Network, Gamaliel Foundation, Brooklyn Ecumenical Cooperatives, founded by former IAF trainer, Richard Harmon and Direct Action and Research Training Center (DART).

=== 1960 to present ===
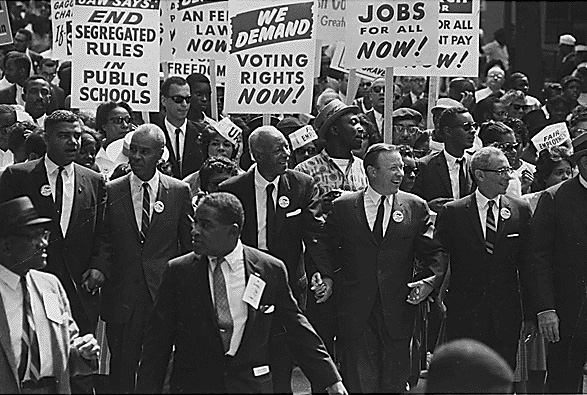
March on Washington for Jobs and Freedom (1963)

In the 1960s the New Left (beginning with Students for a Democratic Society) tried their hand at community organizing. They were critical of what they conceived of as Alinsky's "dead-end local activism". But the dispiriting reality was that however much they might talk about "transforming the system," "building alternative institutions," and "revolutionary potential", their credibility on the doorstep rested on their ability to secure concessions from, and therefore to develop relations with, the local power structures. Community organizing appeared to trap the radical activists in "a politics of adjustment". By the beginning of the 1970s most of the New Left groups had vacated their store-front offices.

Nonetheless, the Civil Rights Movement, anti-war protest, ethnic mobilizations, women's liberation, and the struggle for gay rights all influenced, and were influenced by, ideas of neighborhood organizing. Experience with federal anti-poverty programs and the upheavals in the cities produced a thoughtful response among activists and theorists in the early 1970s that has informed activities, organizations, strategies and movements through the end of the century. Less dramatically, civic association and neighborhood block clubs were formed all across the country to foster community spirit and civic duty, as well as provide a social outlet.

==== Loss of urban communities ====
During these decades, the emergence of an ongoing process of white flight, the ability of middle-class white Americans to move out of majority Black areas, and the professionalization of community organizations into 501(c)3 nonprofits, among other issues, increasingly dissolved the tight ethnic and racial communities that had been so prevalent in urban areas during the first part of the century. As a result, community organizers began to move away from efforts to mobilize existing communities and towards efforts to create community, fostering relationships between community members. While community organizers like Alinsky had long worked with churches, these trends led to an increasing focus on congregational organizing during the 1980s, as organizing groups rooted themselves in one of the few remaining broad-based community institutions. This shift also led to an increased focus on relationships among religion, faith, and social struggle.

==== Emergence of national organizing support organizations ====
A collection of training and support organizations for national coalitions of mostly locally governed and mostly FBCO community organizing groups were founded in the Alinsky tradition. The Industrial Areas Foundation was the first, created by Alinsky himself in 1940. The other key organizations include ACORN, PICO National Network, Direct Action and Research Training Center, and the Gamaliel Foundation. The role of the organizer in these organizations was "professionalized" to some extent and resources were sought so that being an organizer could be more of a long-term career than a relatively brief, mostly unfunded interlude. The training provided by these national "umbrella" organizations helps local volunteer leaders learn a common "language" about organizing while seeking to expand the skills of organizers.

==== Examples of community organizers ====
Many of the most notable leaders in community organizing today emerged from the National Welfare Rights Organization. John Calkins of DART, Wade Rathke of ACORN, John Dodds of Philadelphia Unemployment Project and Mark Splain of the AFL–CIO, among others. There have been many other notable community organizers through the decades: Mark Andersen, Ella Baker, Heather Booth, César Chávez, Lois Gibbs, Mother Jones, Martin Luther King Jr., Ralph Nader, Huey P. Newton, Barack Obama, and Paul Wellstone.

==== Youth organizing ====
More recently has come the emergence of youth organizing groups around the country. These groups use neo-Alinsky strategies while also usually providing social and sometimes material support to less-privileged youth. Most of these groups are created by and directed by youth or former youth organizers.

==== 2008 presidential election ====
Prior to his entry into politics, President Barack Obama worked as an organizer for a Gamaliel Foundation FBCO organization in Chicago. Marshall Ganz, former lieutenant of César Chávez, adapted techniques from community organizing for Obama's 2008 presidential election. At the 2008 Republican National Convention, former New York City mayor Rudolph Giuliani questioned Obama's role as a community organizer, asking the crowd "What does a community organizer actually do?", and was answered with resounding applause. This was seconded by the vice presidential nominee, Alaska governor Sarah Palin, who stated that her experience as the mayor of Wasilla, Alaska was "sort of like being a community organizer, except that you have actual responsibilities." In response, some progressives, such as Congressman Steve Cohen (D-TN) and liberal pundit Donna Brazile, started saying that "Jesus was a community organizer, Pontius Pilate was a governor", a phrase produced on bumper stickers and elsewhere. Pontius Pilate was the Roman Prefect who ordered the execution of Jesus.

After Obama's election in 2008, the campaign organization "Obama for America," became "Organizing for America," and has been placed under the auspices of the Democratic National Committee (DNC). Organizing for America sought to advance the president's legislative agenda and played an important role in building grassroots support for The Affordable Health Care Act. After the 2012 election, OFA went through another transition and is now called Organizing for Action. This 501(c)4 organization focuses on training people to be community organizers and working on local and national progressive issues such as climate change, immigration reform and marriage equality.

== History in the United Kingdom ==
=== TCC (Trefnu Cymunedol Cymru / Together Creating Communities) ===
TCC (Trefnu Cymunedol Cymru / Together Creating Communities) is the oldest community organising group in the UK, founded in 1995. TCC is an institutional membership organisation; members include community groups, faith groups, and schools, from across North East Wales (Wrexham, Flintshire, and Denbighshire). As a broad-based alliance, TCC brings communities together for action on local, regional, and national issues. TCC is remarkable in community organising in that its area of operation includes a diverse geographical region, including many rural areas, and is notably not based in a city.

TCC has had success with a number of campaigns over the last 25 years. This includes getting several employers (including the Welsh Assembly) to pay the Living Wage, improving Muslim women's access to leisure facilities, making Wales the world's first Fairtrade nation, improving British Sign Language provision for Deaf young people, getting a Parkinson's nurse to be based in North East Wales, getting a local authority to recycle instead of building an incinerator, and getting a homeless shelter for Wrexham.

In 2019, TCC's Stop School Hunger / Dysgu Nid Llwgu campaign led to the Welsh Government committing funding so that the poorest pupils in Wales will be able to afford breakfast as well as lunch at school. TCC runs an ongoing programme of community organising training for adults and young people. Community leaders from TCC's diverse membership work together to actively engage in democracy and decision making, holding regular accountability meetings ahead of elections and building ongoing relationships with power holders.

=== Community Organisers (CO) programme, 2011–2015 ===
In 2010 the Conservative/Liberal Democrat Coalition Government pledged as part of its commitment to the Big Society to train a new generation of Community Organisers (CO) programme. This policy aim sat alongside a number of other policy objectives including The Localism Act all of which were designed to give new powers to communities to take great control over their neighbourhoods, services and assets. The Cabinet Office commissioned Ipsos MORI and NEF Consulting to conduct the evaluation of the CO programme. Evaluation work began in October 2012 and the main report, published in December 2015, summarises the final assessment of the programme.

=== Community Organisers Expansion Programme (COEP), 2017–2020 ===
In March 2017, Community Organisers secured a major £4.2m contract from the Office for Civil Society, part of the Department of Culture Media and Sport (DCMS), to expand its movement of Community Organisers from 6,500 to 10,000 by 2020. The programme embeds community organising as part of the fabric of neighbourhoods across England and equips local people with the skills to transform their communities for good. It expands the community organising movement to include young people from the National Citizen Service (NCS) and ambassadors for the #iwill social action campaign for 10 to 20-year-olds. The programme has also established the National Academy of Community Organising to sustain the ongoing training of Community Organisers.

=== Community Organisers ===
A key commitment of the Community Organisers (CO) programme, was to build an independent legacy body that would sustain and develop Community Organising in England. Established in 2015, Community Organisers (originally known as COLtd) is the National Training and Membership body for Community Organisers in England, delivering accredited training. Community Organisers has also established he National Academy of Community Organising to provide training and support to people in community organising in the UK.

=== National Academy of Community Organising ===
The National Academy of Community Organising (NACO) provides training and qualification courses in community organising. It is a network of affiliated local hubs of community organising known as Social Action Hubs.

=== London Citizens ===
London Citizens began life in East London in 1996 as TELCO (the East London Communities Organisation) subsequently expanding to South London, West London and by 2011 into North London. London Citizens has a dues paying institutional membership of over 160 schools, churches, mosques, trade unions, synagogues and voluntary organisations. In the beginning, small actions were undertaken to prevent a factory from contaminating the area with noxious smells and prevent drug dealing in school neighbourhoods. Over time larger campaigns were undertaken. Before Mayoral elections for the Greater London Authority in 2000, 2004 and 2008 major Accountability Assemblies were held with the main mayoral candidates. They were asked to support London Citizens and work with them on issues such as London Living wage; an amnesty for undocumented migrants; safer cities initiatives and development of community land trust housing. South London Citizens held a citizens enquiry into the working of the Home Office department at Lunar House and its impact on the lives of refugees and migrants. This resulted in the building of a visitor centre.

=== Citizens UK ===
Citizens UK has been promoting community organising in the UK since 1989 and has established the profession of Community Organiser through the Guild of Community Organisers teaching the disciplines of strategy and politics. Neil Jameson, the executive director of Citizens UK, founded the organisation after training with the Industrial Areas Foundation in the US. Citizens UK (formerly the Citizens Organising Foundation) established citizens groups in Liverpool, North Wales, the Black Country, Sheffield, Bristol, Milton Keynes and London. London Citizens' forerunner TELCO was formed in 1996. Milton Keynes Citizens began in 2010. The others had a brief and glorious start lasting roughly 3 years when COF was unable to finance them any longer. Manchester Changemakers was formed in 2007 and is independent of Citizens UK.

=== Citizens UK General Election Assembly ===
In May 2010 Citizens UK held a General Election Assembly at the Methodist Central Hall Westminster with 2,500 people from member institutions and the world media present. This event was three days before the election and proved to be one of the most dynamic and electric events of the election campaign. Citizens UK had negotiated to have David Cameron, Nick Clegg and Gordon Brown as the leaders of the three main political parties attend. Each candidate for Prime Minister was questioned on stage concerning their willingness to work with Citizens UK if elected. Each undertook to work with Citizens UK and come to future assemblies to give account of work achieved. In particular they agreed to work to introduce the Living Wage and to end the practice of holding children of refugee families in detention.

==== Living wage ====
In 1994, the city of Baltimore passed the first living-wage law in the US. This changed the working and living conditions of Baltimore's low-wage service workers and established an example for other cities in the US. In London it was a campaign launched in 2001 by London Citizens, the largest civil alliance in the Citizens UK network. The Living Wage Campaign calls for every worker in the country to earn enough to provide their family with the essentials of life. Launched by London Citizens in 2001, the campaign had by 2010 persuaded more than 100 employers to pay the Living wage and won over £40 million of Living Wages, lifting 6,500 families out of working poverty. The Living Wage is a number. An hourly rate, set independently, every year (by the Greater London Authority in London). It is calculated according to cost of living and gives the minimum pay rate required for a worker to provide their family with the essentials of life. In London the 2010–11 rate was £7.85 per hour. London is now being copied by other cities around the UK. As a result, Citizens UK set up the Living Wage Foundation in 2011 to provide companies with intelligence and accreditation. It also moderates the hourly rate applicable for the Living Wage outside London.

==== People's Olympic Legacy ====
When London announced it would bid to be the host city for the Olympic Games in 2012, London citizens used their power to gain a lasting legacy for Londoners from the billions that was to be spent. Following on from hundreds of one-to-one meetings and a listening campaign across member institutions, in 2004 London Citizens signed an historic agreement with the London 2012 bid team, which set in stone precisely what the people of east London could expect in return for their support in hosting the Olympic Games. The People's Promises, as they are known, demanded:

- 2012 permanently affordable homes for local people through a Community land trust and mutual home ownership;
- Money from the Olympic development to be set aside to improve local schools and the health service;
- University of East London to be main higher education beneficiary of the sports legacy and to consider becoming a Sports Centre of Excellence
- At least £2m set aside immediately for a Construction Academy to train up local people;
- That at least 30% of jobs are set aside for local people;
- That the Lower Lea Valley is designated a "Living Wage Zone" and all jobs guaranteed a living wage

The Olympic Delivery Authority, the London Organising Committee for the Olympic Games and the Olympic Legacy Company work with London Citizens to ensure that these promises are delivered.

==== Independent Asylum Commission ====
Citizens UK set up the Independent Asylum Commission in order to investigate widespread concern about the way refugees and asylum seekers were being treated by the UK Border Agency (now, UK Visas and Immigration). The report made a series of over 200 recommendations for change which are still being negotiated. This resulted in the ending of the practice of holding children of refugee families in detention by the Coalition government elected in 2010.

=== ACORN UK ===
ACORN UK was formed by 100 tenants supported by 3 staff organisers in Easton, Bristol in May 2014 who voted to organise for more security, better quality and more affordable housing. Two of the founding members were graduates of the Community Organisers programme. ACORN has since hired more staff and organised branches in Newcastle and recently Sheffield and the organisation involves 15,000 members. ACORN UK has combined online organising via social media with ACORNs traditional door-knocking approach, to organise transient private sector tenants. The group has also combined local direct-action "member defence" actions (including eviction resistances and picketing of rogue landlords/letting agents) with larger regional and national campaigns for housing rights (for example winning regional local authority support for including the standards of their "ethical lettings charter" in the regional West of England Rental Standard and persuading Santander bank to drop a buy to let mortgage clause requiring landlords to raise rents). They also worked alongside Generation Rent to register and mobilise the "renters vote" in the 2016 general election.

=== Living Rent ===
Living Rent is Scotland's tenant union, also affiliated to ACORN International. The group formed out of the Living Rent campaign in 2015 and today has branches in Glasgow and Edinburgh and two organising staff.

=== Political analysis ===
Community organising in the UK is distinctive because it deliberately sets out to build permanent alliances of citizens to exercise power in society. The UK analysis is that to understand Society it is necessary to distinguish Civil Society from the State and the Market. In a totalitarian Society all three may virtually coincide. In a fully democratic society the three will be distinct. Where the state and the market become predominant, even in a democracy, civil society is reduced on the one hand to voting and volunteering and on the other to consuming. This is very dangerous for democracy because the sense of citizenship and agency becomes feeble and ineffective. In other words, Civil Society becomes powerless. Community organising and the role of the professional Community Organiser is working out how to take back power from the State and the Market by holding them accountable. The state and the market cannot operate without moral values and direction. It is not the role of the state or the market to determine those values. In a democratic society there has to be a genuine public discourse concerning justice and the common good. Problems with the global banking system in 2008 in large part arose because "light touch regulation" meant that there was no underlying moral system. The market was left to its own devices with disastrous consequences for the global economy.

==== Intermediate institutions ====
Community organising works because it organises people and money through the institutions which have the potential to engage in the public discourse about what is the common good. These are the institutions which can mediate between the family and the State – such as faith organisations, cooperatives, schools, trades unions, universities and voluntary agencies. Community organising builds these institutions into permanent citizens membership alliances which work together to identify issues and agree ways of introducing solutions. Community organising teaches the art of non-partisan, democratic politics. Because community organising brings together diverse institutions which do not normally work together it is sometimes referred to as Broad Based community organising.

Community organising starts with the recognition that change can only come about when communities come together to compel public authorities and businesses to respond to the needs of ordinary people. It identifies and trains leaders in diverse communities, bringing them together to voice their needs and it organises campaigns to ensure that these needs are met. "Our answer is to organise people through the places where they have regular contact with their neighbours – faith institutions and workplaces and educational establishments. Our experience of practising broad based community organising across the UK has confirmed for us that the threads that once connected the individual to the family, the family to their community and the community to the wider society are fraying and in danger of breaking altogether. We believe these strands, connections and alliances are vital for a healthy democracy and should be the building blocks of any vibrant civil society. We believe in building for power which is fundamentally reciprocal, where both parties are influenced by each other and mutual respect develops. The power and influence that we seek is tempered by our religious teachings and moral values and is exercised in the fluid and ever-changing relationship with our fellow leaders, allies and adversaries. We value and seek to operate in the public sphere. We believe that UK public life should be occupied not just by a few celebrities and politicians – but also by the people themselves seeking a part of the action."

=== Institute for Community Organising ===
Citizens UK set up the Institute for Community Organising (ICO) as part of its Centre for Civil Society established in 2010 in response to growing demands for its training. The ICO is the first operating division of the centre and was established to offer a series of training opportunities for those who wish to make community organising a full or part-time career and also for Community Leaders who wish to learn the broad philosophy and skills of community organising and who are in a position to put them into practice in their institutions and neighbourhoods. The Institute provides training and consultancy on a commercial basis to other agencies which wish to employ the skills and techniques of community organising in their institutions. The ICO has an Academic Advisory Board and an International Professional Advisory Body drawn from the global network of Community Organising Institutes in the UK (CITIZENS UK), US (Industrial Areas Foundation) and Germany (DICO).

=== Labour Party ===
In 2018, the Labour Party set up a Community Organising Unit to focus on organising with communities and groups of employees, helping them to campaign on local and workplace issues.

== History in Australia ==
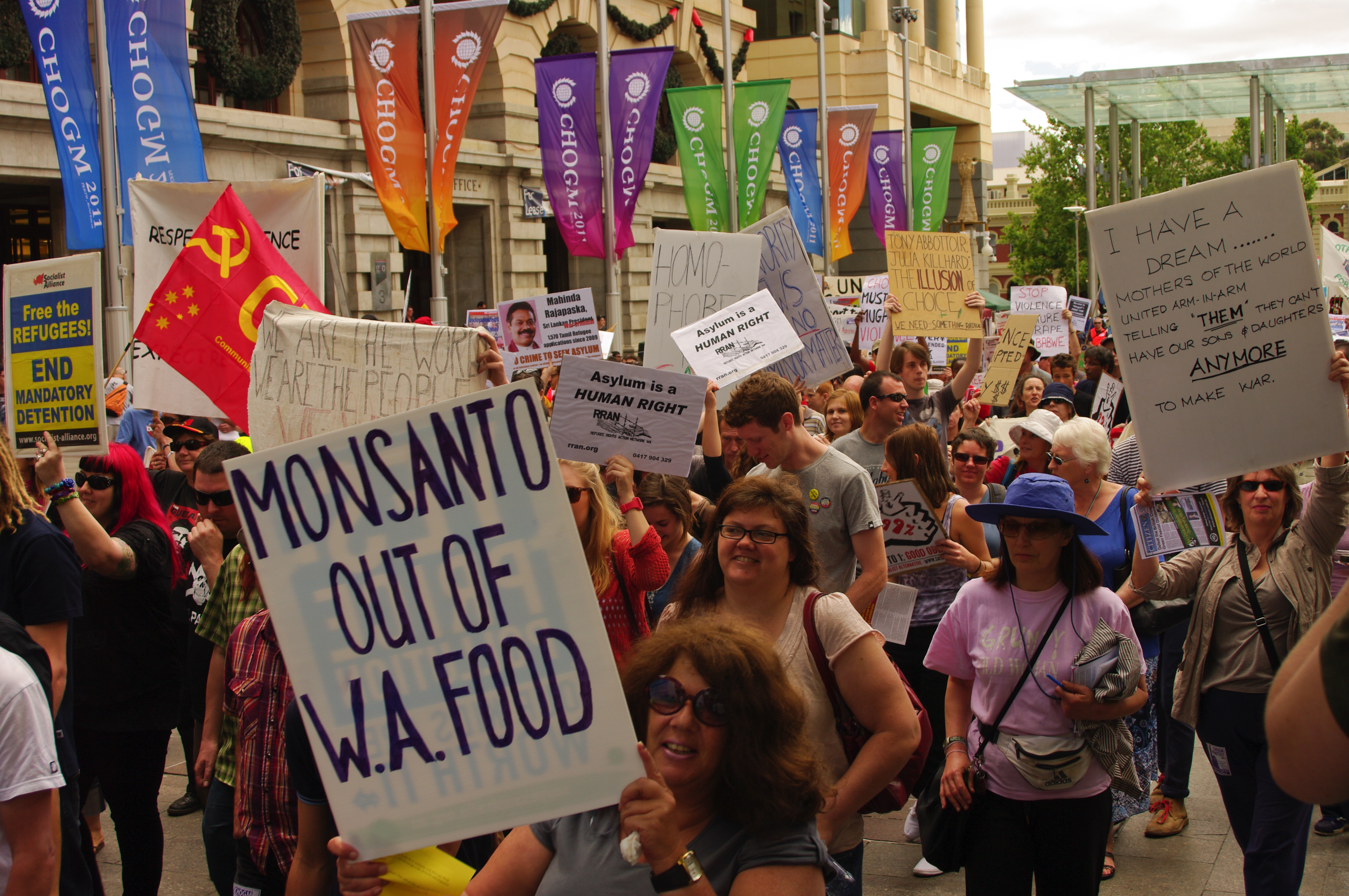
CHOGM 2011 protest gnangarra-96

Since 2000, active discussion about community organizing had begun in Sydney. A community organizing school was held in 2005 in Currawong, involving unions, community organizations and religious organizations. In 2007, Amanda Tattersall, a union and community organizer, approached Unions NSW to sponsor the initial stages of a new community organizing coalition called the Sydney Alliance. The coalition launched on 15 September 2011 with 43 organisations and is supporting the establishment of other community organizing coalitions across the country.

== Community organizing in Hong Kong ==
=== Emergence of community organizing in the 1970s ===
After the 1966 Star Ferry Riots and 1967 Riots, the British colonial government launched a series of policies to pacify the discontent and strengthen its rule. One of the measures was the subvention of "Neighbourhood Level Community Development Project" (NLCDP) in 1978, which is interpreted as an act to manage the pressure groups. Social workers were hired to provide activities and promote engagement in areas in shortage of welfare services. According to some scholars' view, in contrast with the government's intention, NLCDP then became a site of "radical community organizing movements" that used protest actions.

The 1970s saw the rise of social and pressure group movements in Hong Kong. Many social organizations and pressure groups were formed without the government's subsidy, in turn having more freedom to organize different activities. Some organizations were formed by progressive Christians. For instance, the Society for Society for Community Organization (SoCO) was formed in 1971. Pastors working in the district Tsuen Wan from six denominations formed a fellowship to discuss local issues, and decided to obtain funding from the World Council of Churches to form the Tsuen Wan Ecumenical Social Service Centre (TWESSC) to serve the low-income people in 1973.

Residents were organized in housing-related movements with demands ranging from improvement of facilities to housing policy. One of the examples is the protest of Yau Ma Tei boat people.

=== Influence of Saul Alinsky in Hong Kong in the 1970s ===
The Asia Committee for People's Organisation (ACPO), influenced by Liberation theology and Saul Alinsky's concepts, provided both financial support and training to church groups in different parts of Asia such as Hong Kong, Korea, Indonesia and the Philippines. They invited Alinsky-trained consultants to organize training programmes and also Alinsky himself to Hong Kong in 1971. Alinsky's two works, Reveille for Radicals and Rules for Radicals were widely read by university students and social workers. Due to Alinsky's influence, the social workers adopted a more aggressive confrontational mode to force the government into actions.

=== Community organizing in the 1990s ===
A few social movements that adopted community organizing to demand housing rights in the 1990s caused much controversy especially in the social work sector, challenging the mode of "community organizing". In 1993, the TWESSC organized some residents of public housing estates to protest, demanding the British colonial government to retract the "Well-off Tenants Policies" that increased the rent for higher-income residents in public housing estates. They planned to march towards the Governor's House but were blocked in the way. They then sat in at the Upper Albert Road, blocking three lanes of the road, and demanded the Governor to take the petition letter. As a result, 23 people were arrested.

In 1994, the Buildings Department took a large-scale action to demolish rooftop houses, which were considered as unauthorized building works. On 17 October, the social workers of TWESSC organized the residents that lived in rooftop structures in Tak Yan House and Cheuk Ming House of Tsuen Wan to protest against the demolition and ask for resettlement and relocation. After camping overnight outside the Murray Building, which accommodated the Buildings, Lands and Planning departments. The protestors staged a sit-in at the lobby and kept all the lifts open, demanding to meet Director of Buildings, Helen Yu Lai Ching-ping. On 14 December, the social workers organized the residents to sit-in on the Garden Road outside the Murray Building. Residents brought their daily life instruments such as empty liquid petroleum gas pots and cooking utensils with the aim to stage a street theatre about losing their home. The liquid petroleum gas pots became the justification of police to clear the protest and caused much controversy. Twenty-two people, including social workers, were arrested under the charge of causing obstruction to traffic in Garden Road and attended court hearings.

In 1995, the rooftop dwellers in Kingland Apartments in Mong Kok protested against the Buildings Department's plan to demolish their rooftop homes. The NGO SoCO, a university students organization Social Movement Resource Centre and some other citizens joined to form the "Kingland's friends" to support the residents. In March, around 20 residents and social workers demonstrated outside the government office. Three were alleged to have clashed with police and security guards and were arrested. In late April, the SoCo decided to withdraw from the "Kingland's friend" and close the case, claiming that "residents were swayed by students associations to plan illegal and violent ways for protest". In May, nearly 300 riot police cleared the Kingland Apartments.

The aftermath of the series of events had an impact on the mode of community organizing in the social work sector. SoCo complained to TWESSC that some of their social workers joined "Kingland's Friends" and intervened in SoCo's work. The executive member and staff of TWESS had disagreement about social workers' position in joining social movements, leading to the dismissal of six workers. The TWESSC was disbanded in January 1997. In 1995, the government announced a plan to eventually abolish NLCDPs. On 1 July 1997, the sovereignty of Hong Kong was handed over to mainland China. The SAR government changed the subvention model to giving a "lump sum grant", which is seen as a measure to depoliticize social work by some scholars. As a result, "radical community organizing" by social workers became less common.

== For international development ==
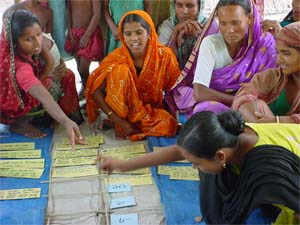
Bartlett-Ranking BGD (2004)

One of Alinsky's associates, Presbyterian minister Herbert White, became a missionary in South Korea and the Philippines and brought Alinsky's ideas, books and materials with him. He helped start a community organization in the Manila slum of Tondo in the 1970s. The concepts of community organizing spread through the many local NGO and activists groups in the Philippines.

Filipino community organizers melded Alinsky's ideas with concepts from liberation theology, a pro-poor theological movement in the developing world, and the philosophy of Brazilian educationalist Paulo Freire. They found this community organizing a well-suited method to work among the poor during the martial law era of the dictator Ferdinand Marcos. Unlike the communist guerrillas, community organizers quietly worked to encourage critical thinking about the status quo, facilitate organization and support the solving of concrete collective problems. Community organizing was thus able to lay the groundwork for the People Power Revolution of 1986, which nonviolently pushed Marcos out of power.

The concepts of community organizing have now filtered into many international organizations as a way of promoting participation of communities in social, economic and political change in developing countries. This is often referred to as participatory development, participatory rural appraisal, participatory action research or local capacity building. Robert Chambers has been a particularly notable advocate of such techniques.

In 2004, members and staff of ACORN created ACORN International which has since developed organization and campaigns in Peru, India, Canada, Kenya, Argentina, the Dominican Republic, Mexico, Honduras, the Czech Republic, Italy and elsewhere.

== See also ==
- Communitarianism
- Community education
- Community practice
- Community psychology
- Critical consciousness (conscientization)
- Critical psychology
- Homeowner association
- Humanism
- Large-group capacitation
- Organization workshop
- Political machine
- Union organizer

== Bibliography ==
- Robert Fisher and Peter Romanofsky, Community Organizing for Urban Social Change: A Historical Perspective (Greenwood Press, 1981). ISBN 978-0-313-21427-1
- Robert Fisher, Let the People Decide: Neighborhood Organizing in America (1984; Twayne Publishers, 1997). ISBN 978-0-8057-3859-9 OCLC 10533392
- Neil Betten and Michael J. Austin, The Roots of Community Organizing, 1917–1939 (Philadelphia: Temple University Press, 1990). ISBN 0-87722-662-8 OCLC 19556345
- Harry C. Boyte, The Backyard Revolution: Understanding the New Citizen Movement (Philadelphia: Temple University Press, 1981, 3rd print). ISBN 9780877222293
- Harry C. Boyte, Commonwealth: A Return to Citizen Politics (New York: The Free Press, 1989). ISBN 0-02-904475-8 OCLC 19815053
- Mark Warren, Dry Bones Rattling: Community Building to Revitalize America (Princeton: Princeton University Press, 2001). ISBN 978-0-691-07432-0 OCLC 44728155
- Heidi Swarts, Organizing Urban America: Secular and Faith Based Progressive Movements (Minneapolis: University of Minnesota Press, 2008). ISBN 0-8166-4839-5 OCLC 154789894
- Aaron Schutz, Empowerment: A Primer (New York: Routledge, 2019). ISBN 978-0367728380
- Aaron Schutz and Mike Miller, eds., People Power: The Saul Alinsky Tradition of Community Organizing (Nashville: Vanderbilt University Press, 2015). ISBN 978-0-8265-2041-8
- Aaron Schutz and Marie G. Sandy, Collective Action for Social Change: An Introduction to Community Organizing (New York: Palgrave Macmillan, 2011). ISBN 0-230-10537-8
- Edward Chambers, Roots for Radicals (New York: Continuum, 2003). ISBN 0-8264-1499-0 OCLC 51848381
- Dennis Shirley, Community Organizing for Urban School Reform (Austin: University of Texas Press, 1997). ISBN 0-292-77719-1 OCLC 36051356
- Shel Trapp, Dynamics of Organizing: Building Power by Developing the Human Spirit (Self published, 2003). Available from the National Training and Information Center, 312-243-3035, Review: Dynamics of Organizing
- Peter Szynka, Theoretische und empirischen Grundlagen des Community Organizing bei Saul D. Alinsky (1909–1972) Eine Rekonstruktion (Bremer Beiträge zur Politischen Bildung. Akademie für Arbeit und Politik der Universität Bremen, Bremen 2006) ISBN 3-88722-656-9.
- Leo J Penta, Community Organizing – Die Macht der Beziehungen (Edition Korber-Stiftung, 2007). ISBN 3-89684-066-5
- Kristin Layng Szakos and Joe Szakos, We Make Change: Community Organizers Talk About What They Do – and Why (Nashville: Vanderbilt University Press, 2007). ISBN 978-0-8265-1554-4
- David Walls, Community Organizing: Fanning the Flame of Democracy (Cambridge, UK: Polity Books, 2015). ISBN 9780745663203
- Richard W. Wise Redlined: A Novel of Boston, Brunswick House Press, 2020. ISBN 9780972822336
- Earl, J. & Kimport, K. (2011), "Taking Action on the Cheap: Costs and Participation", in Digitally Enabled Social Change. The MIT Press, 2013.
