= Industrial Areas Foundation =

Broad-based Community Organising Network

- Abbreviation: IAF
- Founded: May 25, 1940; 85 years ago
- Founders: Saul David Alinsky, Marshal Field, Bernard James Sheil, Kathryn Lewis
- Tax ID no.: 36-2334627
- Legal status: 501(c)(3) nonprofit organization
- Purpose: To build organizations whose primary purpose is power—the ability to act—and whose chief product is social change; to practice what the founding fathers preached: the ongoing attempt to make life, liberty, and the pursuit of happiness everyday realities for more and more Americans.
- Headquarters: Chicago, Illinois, US
- IAF Co-Chair: Georgianna Gleason
- IAF Co-Chair: Bishop Joel N. Martinez
- National Co-Director: Joe Rubio
- National Co-Director: Martin Trimble
- Subsidiaries: www.metro-iaf.org www.swiaf.org
- Revenue: $1,401,825 (2024)
- Employees: 3 (2024)
- Website: www.industrialareasfoundation.org

The Industrial Areas Foundation (IAF) is a national community organizing network established in 1940 by Saul Alinsky, Roman Catholic Bishop Bernard James Sheil and businessman and founder of the Chicago Sun-Times Marshall Field III. The IAF partners with religious congregations and civic organizations at the local level to help them build organizations of organizations, referred to as broad-based organizations by the Industrial Areas Foundation, with the purpose of strengthening citizen leadership, developing trust across a community's dividing lines and taking action on issues identified by local community leaders.

The Industrial Areas Foundation consists of 65 affiliates in the US, Canada, the United Kingdom, Germany and Australia, with the US projects organized into two regions, West / Southwest IAF and Metro IAF. IAF provides training, consultation and organizers for its affiliated organizations.

The Industrial Areas Foundation does not provide direct services, but through its organizing has created notable entities for workforce development (Project QUEST, Capital IDEA, Project IOWA, VIDA, ARRIBA, NOVA, Skills Quest, Capital IDEA – Houston, AZ Career Pathways and JobPath), healthcare (Common Ground Healthcare), and housing development for working- and middle-class families (Nehemiah Project in East Brooklyn and The Road Home Program in New Orleans). In 1994, the IAF organization in Baltimore designed and passed the first living wage bill in the US, and since then IAF organizations across the country have won changes including municipal living wage policies for public sector workers and living wage requirements for tax abatements or economic incentives, that have raised the wages of millions of workers.

== History ==
=== Under Alinsky ===
Alinsky's first organizing project was organizing the Back of the Yards Neighborhood Council, founded in 1939 as the Packinghouse Workers, the union of Chicago's meatpacking industry. Based on his work with Back of the Yards, Alinsky laid out his vision for "People's Organizations" in his book Reveille for Radicals, in 1946. After World War II, Alinsky met Fred Ross in California, and in 1949 he agreed to back his plan to organize the Community Service Organization in Mexican-American communities.

Ross introduced house meetings as an organizing technique and built a network of 30 CSOs in California with energetic young organizers Cesar Chávez and Dolores Huerta.

In Chicago, Alinsky developed a team of organizers including journalist Nicholas von Hoffman, ex-seminarian Edward T. Chambers, and Tom Gaudette, who developed such groups as the Organization for the Southwest Community (1959–1972), The Woodlawn Organization (1961–present), and the Northwest Community Organization (1962–present).

The Woodlawn Organization (TWO) received national attention through Charles Silberman's best-selling Crisis in Black and White in 1964, which traced the roots of oppression and violence in northern inner-city areas. In his concluding chapter, "The Revolt Against Welfare Colonialism," Silberman portrayed TWO as an example of poor blacks reclaiming their dignity through self-organization and creating their own jobs, instead of blaming whites for all their problems.

Alinsky's experience in Rochester, New York from 1965 to 1969 with the organization FIGHT and its battle with Eastman Kodak was more controversial and less successful.

In 1969, Alinsky was able to establish a formal IAF organizer training program, run by Chambers and Dick Harmon, with a grant from Gordon Sherman of Midas Muffler. Alinsky published a successful book, Rules for Radicals, in 1971, updating his earlier vision.

Alinsky died unexpectedly of a heart attack in June 1972.

=== After Alinsky ===
After Alinsky's death, his long-time associate and designated successor, Ed Chambers, became executive director. Chambers began to place systematic training of organizers and local leaders at the center of IAF's work. He also began to shift the organizing model of "the modern IAF" toward the congregation-based community organization developed in San Antonio, Texas by Ernesto Cortes Jr., called Communities Organized for Public Service (COPS). Cortes recruited lay leaders, including many women, from the Catholic parishes that were members of COPS. Relational meetings or "one-on-ones" became an important technique of exploring values, motivation, and self-interest of potential leaders. Chambers and Cortes emphasized a long-term relationship between IAF and such groups as COPS, in contrast to the "three years and out" that Alinsky had once imagined. As IAF began to expand to other cities in Texas, it moved to develop multi-racial, broad-based organizations spanning metropolitan areas, and including African American, Latino, and Anglo churches. Eventually its network of local groups in Texas linked together as Texas Interfaith to influence state government. In 1979 Chambers moved the IAF headquarters to New York after the Archdiocese of Chicago cut its support for IAF. In 1996 IAF moved its national headquarters back to Chicago to develop a new affiliate in that metropolitan area and expand its work in the South, Southwest and Midwest.

IAF developed successful projects along the East Coast with East Brooklyn Congregations, which pioneered the affordable housing project called Nehemiah Homes, and BUILD in Baltimore which also developed Nehemiah housing for low-income people.

The "modern IAF" has been an influential model for other networks of broad-based community organizations, including PICO National Network, Gamaliel Foundation, and Direct Action and Research Training Center (DART).

IAF claims responsibility for the success of the first living wage law in Baltimore in 1994, followed by New York City in 1996, Tucson in 1998, the Rio Grande Valley in the late 1990s and early 2000s and, most recently, in Austin, Texas.

== Governance ==
IAF's legal authority rests in a Board of Trustees, which functions more as an advisory body, recently including such notables as Jean Bethke Elshtain and the late Monsignor John Joseph Egan. IAF's first Board of Trustees included Catholic bishop Bernard James Sheil, Kathryn Lewis (daughter of coal miners union leader John L. Lewis), and philanthropist Marshall Field III. Chambers retired as executive director in 2009, but remains on the board of directors. The senior regional organizers, including Cortes, Arnold Graf, Michael Gecan, and Sr. Christine Stephens, for a time acted as a team of co-directors. Recently IAF has divided itself administratively into two parts: West/Southwest IAF (Cortes and Stephens) and Metro IAF in the East and Midwest (Graf and Gecan).

== Training ==
The national IAF conducts an intensive eight-day leadership training program annually, alternating the venue between Chicago and Los Angeles, and also has a 90-day organizer internship program. IAF's "iron rule of organizing" ("Never do for others what they can do for themselves") emphasizes developing new leaders from within local organizations.

== Affiliates ==
IAF affiliates with web pages are listed below.

East

- Greater Boston Interfaith Organization (GBIO) – Boston, Massachusetts
- Interfaith Community Organization (ICO) – Hoboken, New Jersey
- Washington Interfaith Network (WIN) – Washington, DC
- Action in Montgomery (AIM) – Silver Spring, Maryland
- Baltimoreans United for Leadership Development (BUILD) – Baltimore, Maryland
- People Acting Together in Howard (PATH) – Columbia, Maryland
- Virginians Organized for Interfaith Community Engagement (VOICE) – Northern Virginia
- Metro IAF NY – New York
  - East Brooklyn Congregations (EBC)
  - Manhattan Together
  - EQUAL – Empowered Queens United in Action and Leadership (EQUAL)
  - South Bronx Churches
  - LI-CAN – Long Island Congregations, Associations and Neighborhoods
  - Westchester United

South

- Durham Congregations, Associations, and Neighborhoods (Durham CAN) – Durham, North Carolina
- Communities Helping All Neighbors Gain Empowerment (CHANGE) – Winston-Salem, North Carolina
- Orange County Justice United in Community Effort (Orange JUICE or JUSTICE UNITED) – Chapel Hill, North Carolina
- Working Together Jackson in Jackson, Mississippi
- Working Together Mississippi in Mississippi

Midwest

- Greater Cleveland Congregations (GCC) – Cleveland, OH
- DuPage United – Glen Ellyn, Illinois
- Lake County United – Libertyville, Illinois
- United Power for Action and Justice – Chicago, Illinois
- Omaha Together One Community (OTOC) – Omaha, Nebraska
- Dane County United – Madison, Wisconsin
- Southeastern Wisconsin Common Ground – Milwaukee, Wisconsin
- A Mid-Iowa Organizing Strategy (AMOS) – Des Moines, Iowa
- Voices Organized In Civic Engagement (VOICE-OKC) in Oklahoma City, OK

Southwest

- The Jeremiah Group – New Orleans, Louisiana
- Together Baton Rouge in Baton Rouge, Louisiana
- Albuquerque Interfaith – Albuquerque, New Mexico
- Dallas Area Interfaith (DAI) – Dallas, Texas
- Allied Communities of Tarrant (ACT) – Fort Worth, Texas
- The Metropolitan Organization (TMO) – Houston, Texas
- Arizona Interfaith Organization – Phoenix, Arizona
- Central Texas Interfaith – Austin, Texas
- EPISO/Border Interfaith – El Paso, Texas
- COPS/Metro Alliance in San Antonio, Texas
- Nevadans for the Common Good in Las Vegas Valley, Nevada
- Northern Arizona Interfaith Council in Flagstaff, Arizona
- Pima County Interfaith Council in Pima County, Arizona
- Valley Interfaith Project in Phoenix, Arizona

West

- One LA – IAF – Los Angeles, California
- Silicon Valley Allied for the Common Good – San Jose, California
- Marin Organizing Committee (MOC) – Marin, California
- Common Ground IAF – Solano and Napa Counties, California
- Communities Organized for Relational Power in Action – Central California
- Inland Empire Sponsoring Committee Pomona, CA & Inland Empire

Northwest

- Metropolitan Alliance for the Common Good (MACG) – Portland, Oregon
- Sound Alliance – Tukwila, Washington
- Spokane Alliance – Spokane, Washington

International

- Greater Edmonton Alliance – Edmonton, Alberta, Canada
- Calgary Alliance for the Common Good – Calgary, Alberta, Canada
- Metro Vancouver Alliance – Vancouver, British Columbia, Canada
- Greater Victoria Acting Together – Victoria, British Columbia, Canada
- Citizen Organizing Foundation (COF) – London, England, United Kingdom
- Sydney Alliance – Sydney, Australia
- Queensland Community Alliance – South East Queensland, Australia
- Deutsches Institut für Community Organizing Germany
