= Gamaliel Foundation =

- Formation: 1968
- Type: NGO
- Legal status: Foundation
- Purpose: Community organizing
- Headquarters: Chicago, Illinois
- Region served: United States; South Africa; United Kingdom
- Website: gamaliel.org

Gamaliel Foundation provides training and consultation and develops national strategy for its affiliated congregation-based community organizations. As of 2013, Gamaliel has 45 affiliates in 17 U.S. states, the United Kingdom, and South Africa, and claims to represent over a million people.

== History ==
The Gamaliel Foundation was founded in Chicago in 1968 to assist the Contract Buyers League, which worked to assist African-American home buyers in the city’s West Side. Gamaliel was reoriented to focus on community organizing when Gregory Galluzzo was hired as executive director in 1986. Seeing its basic function as training and developing leaders in low-income communities, Gamaliel’s goal is "to assist local community leaders to create, maintain and expand independent, grassroots, and powerful faith-based community organizations" that have the power to influence political and economic decisions that impact cities and regions. The name "Gamaliel" refers to the Biblical wise man who was a teacher to St. Paul (see Acts 5:38-39; and Acts 22:3), whom Saul Alinsky considered to be the first great congregation-based organizer.

Gamaliel Foundation works in the community organizing tradition of Alinsky, who began his work in Chicago with the Back of the Yards Neighborhood Council in 1939. Following Alinsky’s death in 1972, his Industrial Areas Foundation, under executive director Edward T. Chambers, moved toward a congregation-based organizing model, emphasizing training and leadership development. Gamaliel has developed along a similar path under the direction of Galluzzo, a former Roman Catholic priest who got his introduction to community organizing in the early 1970s in Chicago, where he worked with the Pilsen Neighborhood Community Council, mentored by such organizers as Tom Gaudette and John Baumann (the founder of PICO National Network).

== Governance ==
Gamaliel’s board of directors has 15 members, and is the ultimate governing authority for the organization, setting policy and overseeing management. The board and staff are advised by the National Clergy Caucus, the African American Leadership Commission, and the International Leadership Assembly. Gamaliel operates with a small staff (approximately 20 in 2008), supplemented by interns and consultants. For example, during the period Barack Obama worked as a community organizer with the Developing Communities Project on the far South Side of Chicago (1985-1988), he was also a consultant and trainer for the Gamaliel Foundation. Gamaliel has five regional directors covering the Eastern, Mideastern, Midwestern, Southern, and Western United States. Affiliated organizations are incorporated separately, raise their own funds, and employ their own organizers. Ana Garcia Ashley became the executive director of Gamaliel in January 2011.

== Current program ==
Gamaliel has refocused its efforts from neighborhood organizations to coalitions that can influence wider metropolitan areas and regions. Gamaliel has begun to formulate strategies for impacting national policy on such issues as comprehensive immigration reform, health care for all, jobs and full employment, affordable housing, and equal access public transportation systems. The Transportation Equity Network (TEN) is a Gamaliel project. To date, the major focus of Gamaliel has been such metropolitan areas as Chicago, St. Louis, Cleveland, Detroit, Northwest Indiana, Milwaukee, Minneapolis, and Kansas City, Missouri. Gamaliel’s long-range plan is to build a metropolitan organization in every major population area in the United States over the next ten years, including raising the necessary money and recruiting the 200 professional organizers essential to reach this goal.

== Training ==
Gamaliel conducts one-week national leadership trainings three times a year in the United States and once a year in South Africa. A three-day advanced training is held annually for leaders who have attended the seven-day national training. A three-day pastors training is offered for leaders who pastor churches. Each December Gamaliel holds a three-day staff training retreat for all the organizers in its network. Gamaliel also conducts numerous half-day, full-day, and weekend trainings for local communities. Ntosake ("she who walks with lions and carries her own things") is a year-long Gamaliel women’s empowerment and leadership development program.

Themes of Gamaliel trainings include such topics as "the world as it is" versus "the world as it should be," engaging the public arena, principles of congregation-based community organizing, power, self-interest, "one-on-one" relational meetings as a building block of organizing, agitation, metropolitan organizing, and building and sustaining an organization.

== See also ==
- Transportation Equity Network
