= Transportation Equity Network =

The Transportation Equity Network's official logo.

The Transportation Equity Network (TEN) is a project of the Gamaliel Foundation and a grassroots organization with more than 350 community organizations in 41 states in the United States. TEN's stated goal is "to create an equity-based transportation system by connecting local transportation campaigns with D.C.-based advocacy."

== History ==
The Transportation Equity Network was founded in 1997 by the Center for Community Change but has since been adopted as a project of the Gamaliel Foundation. TEN was founded to advocate for public transportation on a national level, to provide assistance to community organizations on the local level, and to advocate for public transportation as a civil rights issue.

== Notable actions ==
TEN worked in 2005 with then-Senator Barack Obama to put workforce development language into a federal transportation authorization bill. This allowed local and state officials to craft local hiring agreements to create employment and training opportunities in the transportation construction sector. One early success was in St. Louis, Missouri, where TEN affiliate Metropolitan Congregations United brought the Missouri Department of Transportation to the table and won an agreement that 30% of the workforce on a $500 million highway project would be low-income apprentices and that 1/2 of 1% of the project budget ($2.5 million) would go to job training. This became known as the Missouri Model. Recently, TEN won a commitment from Secretary of Transportation Ray LaHood to encourage state Departments of Transportation to adopt TEN’s “Green Construction Careers (Missouri Model)” of workforce development nationwide. TEN also recently worked with Rep. Russ Carnahan to secure language in the jobs bill that passed the U.S. House of Representatives on December 17, 2009, to give transit authorities local control over spending priorities for up to 10 percent of the bill’s $8.4 billion in emergency public transit funding. In December 2009, the Congressional Black Caucus lifted up TEN’s “Green Construction Careers (Missouri Model)” in an open letter to President Obama.

TEN and its affiliates also pursue causes on a local level. In April 2010, TEN member Metropolitan Congregations United (MCU) and allies led a successful campaign in support of a ballot initiative to reinvest in transit in St. Louis city and county. Voters overwhelmingly supported the measure, which will provide $75 million a year to restore service cuts. In the San Francisco Bay Area, TEN affiliate GENESIS was among several civil rights groups that filed a federal civil rights complaint and successfully stopped the use of $70 million in stimulus funds for a rail project that would have violated the Civil Rights Act. Instead, the money will be used to avoid cuts in the region’s other transit lines. In August 2010, in Kansas City, Missouri, TEN member MORE2 secured $11 million in local transit funding over 10 years, an increase of $5 million over previous levels. In Minnesota, TEN member ISAIAH successfully argued that a planned light rail line (the METRO Green Line) connecting Minneapolis and Saint Paul should include three additional stops in underserved, low-income communities. Also in Minnesota, after a five-year-long intensive campaign, ISAIAH convinced Minnesota Department of Transportation to dedicate $6.2 million in federal highway money over the next five years to training and apprenticeships in highway construction work to low-wage workers, people of color and women. In October 2010, TEN affiliate MORE2 successfully worked to ensure that equity requirements would be included in the new TIGER II federal grants.

== See also ==
- Gamaliel Foundation
