= Communities Helping All Neighbors Gain Empowerment =

Communities Helping All Neighbors Gain Empowerment, or CHANGE, is a Winston-Salem, North Carolina–based non-profit organization founded in 2002 that encourages civic participation among local residents. Affiliated with Industrial Areas Foundation, CHANGE is made up of and funded by some 45 religious congregations, neighborhood associations, and other groups, and claims a membership base of 18,000.

== Organization and service ==
The current Lead Organizer for CHANGE is Mauricio Castro. In recent years CHANGE has developed into one of the most successful and effective organizations in North Carolina.

CHANGE's agenda is divided into five main categories: Youth and Education, Jobs and Economic Development, Health Care, Housing and Neighborhoods, and Local Government. "Action Teams," which gather via house meetings, research each category to determine needs and issues that can be immediately addressed by lobbying local government, non-profit and/or corporate leaders.

Each member organization is represented on either the Clergy Caucus (for congregational-based representatives) or the Metro Council (for lay leaders). Recommendations made by Action Teams are voted on by these councils, and a 75% vote of support is required before any action is taken. A thirteen-member strategy team, made up of members from the two councils, also participates in voting.

Some successful campaigns led by CHANGE in the past have included the creation of equity standards in schooling, the creation of a bond oversight commission in Forsyth County Schools, distribution of employment assistance booklets, usage of a local economic development fund to draw the business of a major computer manufacturer, providing summer jobs for teenagers, auditing of reduced cost health clinics, the creation of a free dental care program, documentation of neighborhood maintenance issues, education drives to improve public participation in city government, increasing Health Department regulations on toxic lead-based paint, and conducting leadership training seminars.

== See also ==
- Industrial Areas Foundation
