= Center for the Study of Los Angeles =

US research institute

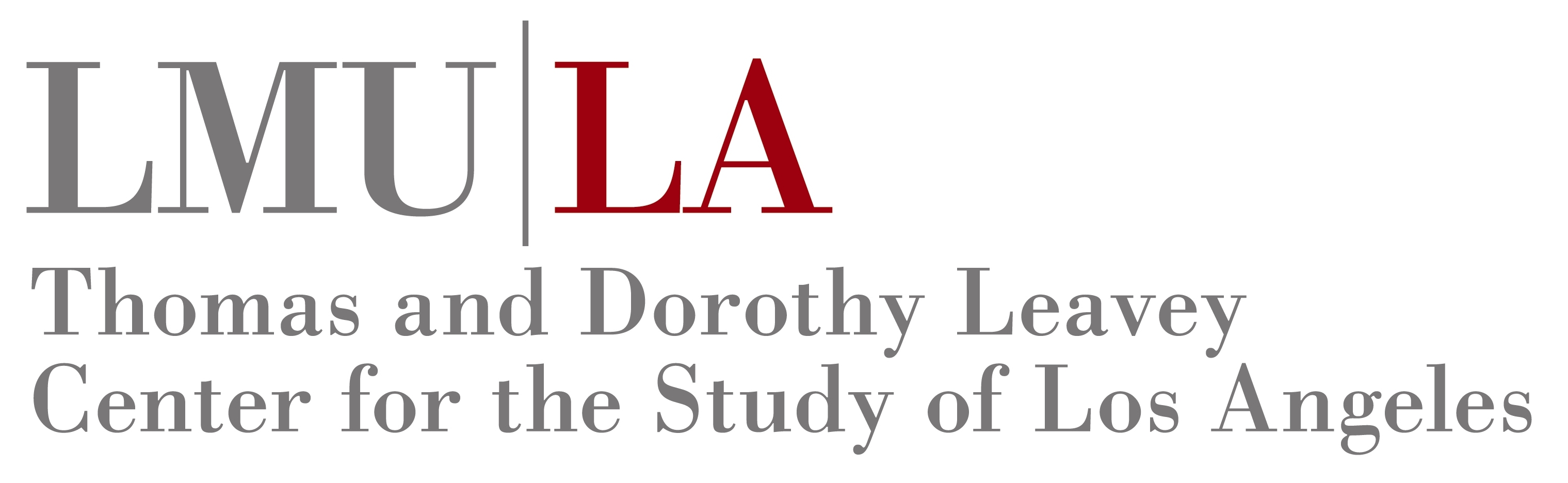
- Formation: 1996; 30 years ago
- Headquarters: 1 Loyola Marymount University Drive, Los Angeles, California
- Coordinates: 33.9708°N 118.4192°W
- Website: www.lmu.edu/studyLA

The Thomas and Dorothy Leavey Center for the Study of Los Angeles (StudyLA) is a non-profit, non-partisan education and research institute at Loyola Marymount University in Los Angeles, California.

The Center for the Study of LA was founded in 1996 by Loyola Marymount University Political Science and Chicana/o studies professor Dr. Fernando Guerra with a grant from the Thomas and Dorothy Leavey Foundation. Guerra is the director of the Center.

CSLA conducts public opinion polls, focusing on public policy and community interests in the city of Los Angeles. Its research covers voter interests, race relations, and urban outcomes.

== Research collection ==
The Thomas and Dorothy Leavey Center for the Study of Los Angeles Research Collection covers various aspects of the Los Angeles region. The collection contains numerous materials and documents unique to Los Angeles, including:

Public officials

- Bob Beverly Papers, 1962–1996 (CSLA-7)
- Mayor Richard J. Riordan Administrative Papers, 1980–2001 (CSLA-17)
- David A. Roberti Papers (CSLA-1)
- Mike Roos Papers, 1977–1991 (CSLA-3)
- Joel Wachs Papers, 1951–2002 (CSLA-29)

Los Angeles developers

- Fritz Burns Papers (2 collections: CSLA-2, CSLA-4)
- Daniel Freeman Family Papers, 1849–1957 (CSLA-21)
- Documents for the History of the Daniel Freeman Family and the Rancho Centinela, 1873–1995 (CSLA-33)
- James Keane Collection of Fritz Burns Biographical Materials, 1923–2001 (CSLA-24)
- Charles Luckman Papers, 1908–2000 (CSLA-34)
- Jack and Bonita Granville Wrather Papers, 1890–1990 (CSLA-23)
- Wrather Investment Corporation Incorporation Records, 1961 (CSLA-28)

Reformers and reform movements

- Catholic Human Relations Council Collection, 1958–1992 (CSLA-27)
- Thomas A. Gaudette Papers, 1938–1996 (CSLA-18)
- LAAMP Collection, 1984–2001 (CSLA-16)
- LEARN Collection, 1974–1999 (CSLA-14)
- William F. Masterson Papers, 1960–2001 (CSLA-19)
- Rebuild LA Collection, 1992–1997 (CSLA-6)

Roman Catholic families

- Dockweiler Family Collection (2 collections: CSLA-12, CSLA-13)
- Documents for the History of the Machado Family and the Rancho La Ballona (CSLA-32)
- Joseph Scott Collection, 1909–1951 (CSLA-10)
- Stephen Mallory White Papers, 1871–1936 (CSLA-8)
- Workman Family Papers, 1881–1997 (CSLA-9)
- Mary Julia Workman Research Materials Collection, 1921–2004 (CSLA-35)

Other collections

- Big Pine Citizen Newspaper Collection, 1922, 1924–1928 (CSLA-30)
- J. D. Black Papers, 1876–1999 (CSLA-15)
- The Citizen and Cheviot Chatter, 1927–1960 (CSLA-5)
- Documents for the History of Nineteenth-Century Los Angeles, 1846–1908 (CSLA-22)
- "LA 2000" Records of the 2000 Democratic National Convention, 1992–2001 (CSLA-31)
- Carroll and Lorrin Morrison Photographic Collection, 1889–1964 (CSLA-26)
- Rancho La Ballona Map, 1876 (CSLA-11)
- Which Way, LA? Collection, 1992–2000 (CSLA-20)
- WPA Transcriptions of Los Angeles City Archives Records, 1825–1850 (CSLA-25)

== Events ==
=== Sacramento seminar ===
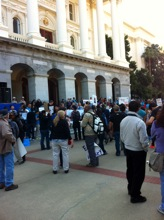
2012 Sacramento Seminar participants observe Occupy Sacramento protests and demonstrations

The Sacramento Legislative Seminar is a longstanding program in Loyola Marymount University's Political Science Department. The program is offered, but not limited, to students enrolled in the Politics of California course held during the spring semester. The purpose of the Sacramento Seminar is to provide undergraduate students from various California institutions with hands-on exposure to California's political system. During the seminar, students participate in panel discussions which are held in the California State Capitol, where they engage in political discourse with prominent government officials, legislators, lobbyists, fellows, and scholars from across the state. The panel discussions give students the opportunity to ask these distinguished guests questions pertaining to a variety of topics. Throughout the seminar, students are encouraged to introduce themselves and meet with public officials and staff to seek personal career advice. The Center plays a significant role in organizing and coordinating the Sacramento Seminar for both the students and professors who attend annually.

=== Undergraduate research symposium ===
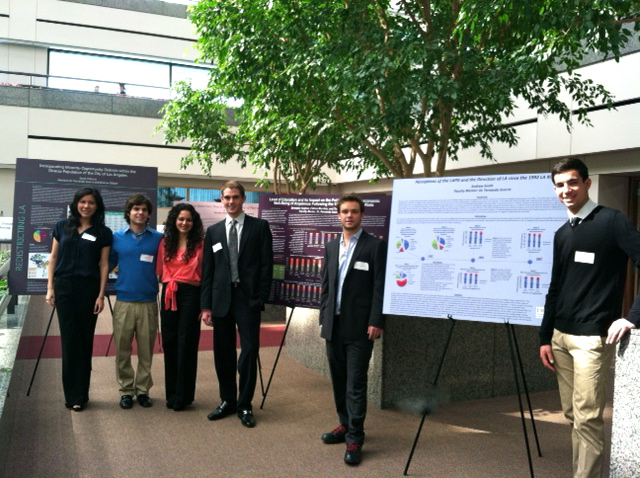
StudyLA undergraduate student researchers participate in the 2012 Undergraduate Research Symposium at LMU

The Undergraduate Research Symposium invites undergraduate students formally to present displays of faculty-mentored research and other creative activity in all academic areas. The Center's undergraduate student researchers are encouraged to participate in the Undergraduate Research Symposium and receive extensive faculty mentorship and staff support with their project and presentation. Recent projects have featured research pertaining to Los Angeles redistricting and CSLA's Los Angeles Riots Anniversary surveys and exit polls.

=== Lecture series ===
For over a decade, the Center for the Study of Los Angeles has planned, coordinated and moderated the Urban Lecture Series and more recently the Fall Lecture Series. The Lecture Series engage top government officials and community leaders in discussion and debate. The conversations are held at Loyola Marymount University on selected Tuesdays throughout the spring and fall semesters. Both series are televised and broadcast on public access television.

==== Participants in the lecture series ====
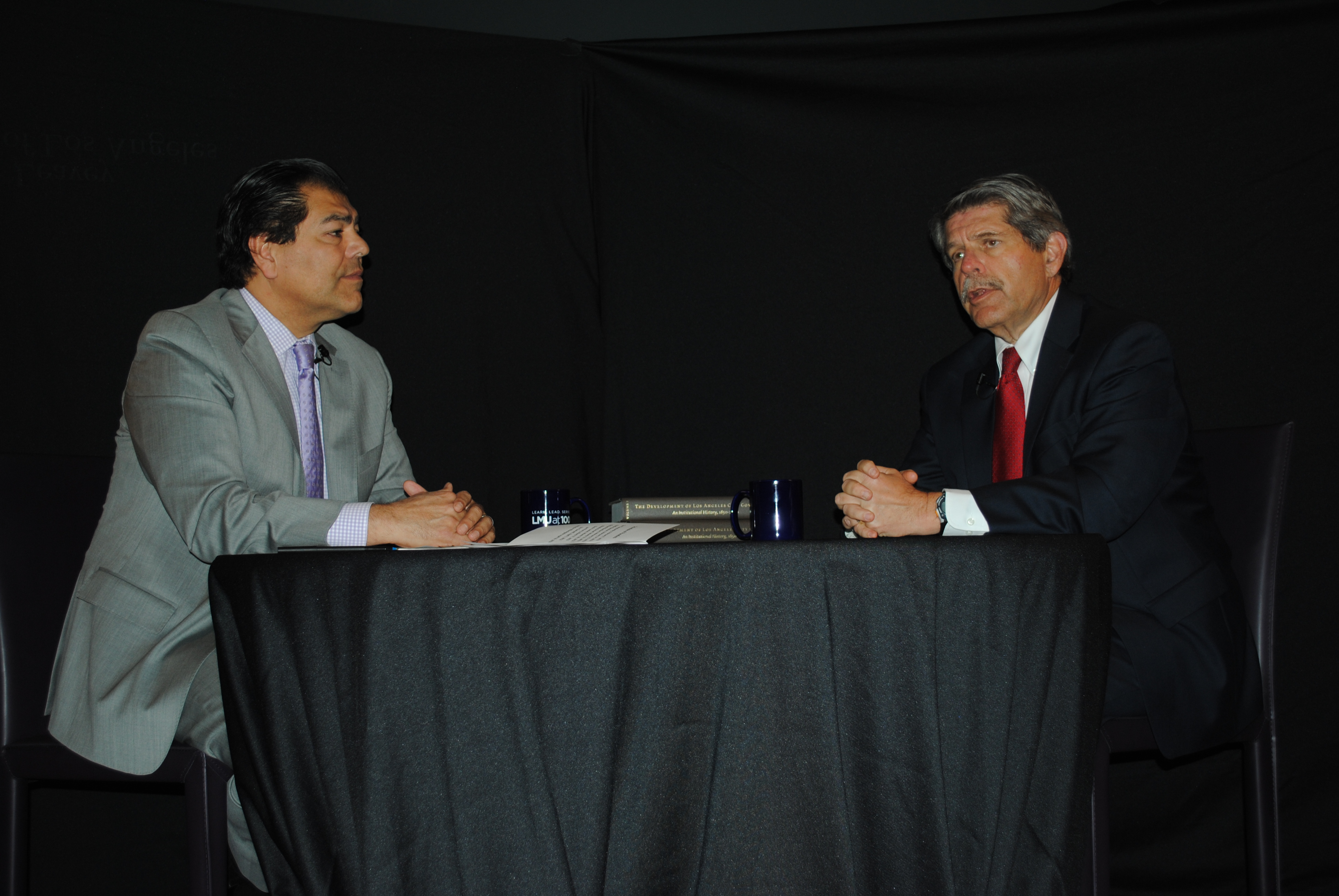
L.A. County Supervisor Zev Yaroslavsky and CSLA Director Fernando Guerra

- Steven Bradford
- George W. Bush
- Cruz Bustamante
- Tony Cardenas
- Gil Cedillo
- Judy Chu
- Maria Elena Durazo
- Carlos Fuentes
- Eric Garcetti
- Ruth Galanter
- Wendy Greuel
- Dolores Huerta
- James Hahn
- Janice Hahn
- Kevin James
- Cindy Miscikowski
- Alex Padilla
- Bernard Parks
- Jan Perry
- Curren Price
- Mark Ridley-Thomas
- Richard Riordan
- Bill Rosendahl
- Steve Soboroff
- Raphael Sonenshein
- Antonio Villaraigosa
- Mike Woo
- Zev Yaroslavsky

== Studies ==
=== Exit polls ===
Following the 2000 and 2004 Presidential elections, discrepancies in exit poll results were proven to be the product of poor sampling techniques and inaccurate results. To mitigate the controversies surrounding exit poll methodology, the Center assembled a team of researchers who implemented a sampling technique known as the "racially stratified homogenous precinct approach" to accurately sample voters in the city of Los Angeles. Research conducted at the Center has shown that the city of Los Angeles is racially segregated, thus voters are more likely voting in racially homogenous precincts. The key component to the stratified approach is the selection of racially and ethnically homogenous precincts throughout the city of Los Angeles.

The Center has conducted exit polls for the 2005 mayoral election, 2008 presidential election, and 2010 gubernatorial election.

=== Los Angeles riots quinquennial resident survey ===
In observance of the Los Angeles riots and disturbances of 1992, CSLA sponsors cross-sectional phone surveys of Los Angeles residents to study their overall perceived attitudes and concerns towards the city of Los Angeles. The CSLA Riots Anniversary Survey is conducted every 5th anniversary marking the L.A. riots and disturbances of 1992. The Riots Anniversary Survey provides data on LA residents' perceptions of race/ethnic relations, the Los Angeles Police Department, local government and neighborhood relations, the likelihood for future riots to occur, the overall direction of Los Angeles, and Los Angeles resident quality of life.
