= Congregation-based Community Organizing =

Community organizing describes a wide variety of efforts to empower residents in a local area to participate in civic life or governmental affairs. Most efforts that claim this label operate in low-income or middle-income areas, and have adopted at least some of the tactics and organizing techniques pioneered by Saul Alinsky and his Industrial Areas Foundation. Other organizations in this tradition include PICO National Network, Gamaliel Foundation, and Direct Action and Research Training Center (DART).

They focus on building political power in the hands of an organization of local residents, and using that power to influence issues the organization defines as important. Congregation-based Community Organizing (CBCO) works through local synagogues, churches, and mosques as the primary institutional sponsors of this work. Common characteristics:

- Faith-based: They ground their organizing in the moral values and traditions that stem from religious faith, to varying degrees and often quite powerfully. See religion and peacebuilding.
- Broad-based: They are typically ecumenical or interfaith, and many include schools, unions, or a variety of other community-based institutions like neighborhood associations.
- Locally constituted: They organize in areas that range from large neighborhoods to entire cities. Although linked into the national and regional networks discussed above, they emphasize local grassroots organizing.
- Multi-issue: Their purpose is to instruct local congregational authorities about how to effectively address a variety of pressing issues facing their communities.
- Professionally staffed: CBCO groups hire professionals to recruit and train leaders to work with their religious communities on a personal and regular basis.
