= Community organizing in immigrant communities =

Community activities for immigrant rights

Community organizing is widely used by immigrant communities to advocate for their interests on issues affecting their lives. Community organizing has been used by immigrant communities to advocate for their rights amid socio-political challenges. It addresses various issues, including language barriers, access to social services, and cultural awareness. The approach fosters collaboration and belonging by enabling immigrants to voice concerns and drive change while serving as an effective mediator between social injustices and affected communities.

Many immigrant communities in the United States are engaged in community organizing activities. Of over 50 million immigrants living in the United States many may experience exploitation in the workforce and different forms of discrimination and challenges in their lives. Many voluntary associations that seek to meet the needs of immigrants utilize community organizing methods aiming to mobilize and empower them and advocate for them.

== History ==
Community organizing in immigrant communities in the United States began in the 18th century but became more prevalent between the 1860s and World War I. This form of community organizing came about as a result of the growing immigrant population in the U.S. over the years. During the nineteenth century, many of the farm workers were Chinese, Japanese, Filipino, and Mexican workers. Immigrants often enter the U.S. through traditional gateway cities, such as San Francisco, New York, Boston and Chicago, and since the 1960s, the foreign-born population has more than doubled from 5.4 percent to 12.4 percent. Essentially, the American environment stimulated the need for this way of organizing. It was important for this population to come together and organize in order to either assimilate into American culture or integrate in respective communities.

Immigrant organizations vary greatly in size and can be well established or unstable. The most popular reasons for the forming of these organizations is defensive — a response to exclusion — and offensive — a way to set themselves apart from others. Over the years, these organizations have formed to respond to the particular needs of immigrants, such as immigrant rights, worker rights and civic engagement.

== Strategies used in community organizing ==
Community organizing takes on a variety of forms to address the various disparities faced by immigrant communities in the United States. Some community organizing groups work in providing social and legal services for the immigrant community whereas others take on a more concentrated approach such as organizing in the workplace. There are also a variety of organizations focused on social change and work closely with other grassroots organizations to put in order social movements. Furthermore, community organizing groups also work in educating immigrant communities about their rights and how to be more involved whether it is through social movements, protests, etc.

== Issues addressed in immigrant community organizing ==
Issues addressed in immigrant community organizing include immigrant rights, worker rights, access to higher education and civic engagement. An example of a well known community organizing movement in which immigrants participated was the Delano grape strike and boycott in 1965. This was led by the United Farm Workers in the effort to improve the treatment of farm workers by the farm labor system.

== Characteristics of organizing in immigrant communities ==
There are certain distinctive characteristics of community organizing in immigrant communities, and it is critical for community organizers to do an assessment of the community prior to entering. Studies have shown that motivation for immigrating to the United States is associated with engagement in political and social justice work. For example, immigrants who came to the United States as refugees or asylum seekers are less likely to join organizations fighting for social and economic justice unless they felt their safety has been threatened. Thus, it is very important for community organizers to recognize and understand the diversity in immigrant communities, diversity within countries of origin, reasons for immigration, and challenges they face.

=== Language differences ===
One distinguishing characteristic of community organizing in immigrant communities is the existence of language differences. The majority of newly arrived immigrants are not native-English speakers. For this reason, it is essential for the organizers to have effective means of communication with the community. An effective approach can be communicating in their native language whenever possible in order to eliminate barriers. There is a high demand for individuals who are bilingual and or multicultural who are capacitated to work with immigrant communities. Some organizations have a policy to operate under the leadership of members from that ethnic group.

=== Partnership With other organizations and institutions ===
Faith-based organizations and other existing cultural, recreational, and social ethnic associations are places where immigrants seek moral and social support. Recent immigrants are more likely to be affiliated with these types of organizations. In some studies, immigrants have stated that their faith and the support of their faith organization played a central role in overcoming their fears and oppositions when engaged in social and economic justice work. Therefore, reaching out to organizations and institutions that have an established relationship with the immigrant community, whether faith-based or community-based, is found to be beneficial for immigrant community organizers.

=== Strategies and social services ===
Existing immigrant organizations that focus on organizing place most of their attention and resources on policy advocacy, civic participation, community education and leadership training. Recent immigrants are often unaware of the American political system and have little political power because of their citizenship status. Hence, organizers aim to build their organization's power through voter registration, voter education, and political campaigns.

In addition to organizing around issues that affect the population that they serve, organizations also provide community education and social services. These services range from classes on English for speakers of other languages, workshops on issues and legislation that affect the immigrant community, and legal services for renewal of work permits to assisting in the naturalization process.

== Organizations engaged in immigrant community organizing ==
- Centro Presente
- New York Immigrant Coalition
- Illinois Coalition for Immigrant and Refugee Rights
- Southwest Organizing Project
- Multi-ethnic Immigrant Worker Organization Network
- Coalition for Humane Immigrant Rights of Los Angeles
- Immigrant & Refugee Community Organization
- Causa Justa :: Just Cause
- Padres & Jovenes Unidos
- United Farm Workers
- East Bay Sanctuary Covenant (EBSC)
