= Direct Action and Research Training Center =

The Direct Action and Research Training Center (DART) is a national network of 23 local faith-based community organizing groups across nine states. DART provides training and consultation for local leaders and professional organizers, giving local communities the skills they need to uncover and take action on pressing local problems. As of 2007, DART is the fourth largest congregation-based community organizing network in the United States.

== History ==
In order to address the unfair treatment of seniors in Miami in 1977, a gathering of religious leaders founded Concerned Seniors of Dade. The organization developed a reputation for being able to quickly and consistently bring together hundreds of people to press city officials around the fair treatment of senior citizens.

Following the eruption of a three-day riot in the city of Miami in response to the police killing of Arthur McDuffie in 1980, leaders from Concerned Seniors of Dade decided to expand their focus and establish People United to Lead the Struggle for Equality (PULSE) organization.

After successfully winning multiple local campaigns for fairness regarding unemployment, minority hiring, and racism in the justice system, the work of PULSE caught the attention of other local communities. In order to equip faith communities in other cities to answer their call to do justice, the DART Center was founded to provide training and expertise in 1982.

Since that time, DART's work quickly spread to other cities in Florida as well as Ohio and Kentucky in the 1980s. In the 1990s, more organizations in Florida as well as Indiana and Virginia were built and expanded its leadership training curriculum. In the 2000s, DART developed a national strategy for recruiting and training professional organizers along with further expansion. In the last decade, DART expanded into South Carolina, Tennessee, Kansas and Georgia.

Since its founding, DART has trained over 10,000 community leaders and 270 professional community organizers, who together have greatly impacted their communities.

== Issues addressed ==
DART affiliates typically have a broad agenda of issues, including racism, public education improvement, criminal justice reform, healthcare provisions, affordable housing, accessible public transportation, and immigrants' rights.

== Training ==
Since 1982 DART has trained over 10,000 community leaders and 270 professional organizers.

In addition to training local volunteer leaders, DART trains professional organizers through the DART Organizers Institute, an on-the-job training for faith-based community organizers. It begins with a four-day classroom orientation followed by five months of field training and a weekly reading and written curriculum related to the basic principles of community organizing. All parts of the Institute take place in each organizer's respective city, so they begin building relationships in their community from day one.

Organizers are assigned to work with select religious congregations in order to expand participation at a major direct action where issues of justice are addressed. Skill development initially focuses on articulating the mission of the organization, intentionally developing relationships through one-on-one conversations, engaging leaders based on their personal motivations, time management, running effective meetings, building networks, long-term planning, working with clergy, and issue development.

Vocational development continues throughout an organizer's career with an annual schedule of three two-day training and planning retreats, summer staff retreats, and joint regional staff trainings.

== Local organization membership ==
DART has 23 affiliated congregation-based community organizations across Florida, Georgia, Indiana, Kansas, Kentucky, Ohio, South Carolina, Tennessee, and Virginia. DART and affiliates employ some 50 professional community organizers.

DART affiliates are listed below

- Florida
  - Broward Organized Leaders Doing Justice (BOLD Justice) -- Fort Lauderdale
  - Fighting Against Injustice Toward Harmony (FAITH) -- Daytona Beach
  - Faith and Action for Strength Together (FAST) -- St. Petersburg
  - Hillsborough Organization for Progress and Equality (HOPE) -- Tampa
  - Interfaith Coalition for Action, Reconciliation and Empowerment (ICARE) – Jacksonville
  - Justice United Seeking Transformation in Pensacola (JUST Pensacola) -- Pensacola
  - Lee Interfaith for Empowerment (LIFE) -- Fort Myers
  - People Acting for Community Together (PACT) – Miami
  - People Engaged in Active Community Efforts (PEACE) – West Palm Beach
  - Polk Ecumenical Action Council for Empowerment (PEACE) -- Lakeland
  - Sarasota United for Responsibility and Equity (SURE) -- Sarasota
- Georgia
  - Justice Unites Savannah Together (JUST) -- Savannah
- Indiana
  - Congregations Acting for Justice and Empowerment (CAJE) -- Evansville
- Kansas
  - Justice Matters—Lawrence
  - Topeka Justice Unity & Ministry Project (Topeka JUMP) -- Topeka
- Kentucky
  - Building a United Interfaith Lexington through Direct-action (BUILD) -- Lexington
  - Citizens of Louisville Organized and United Together (CLOUT) – Louisville
- Ohio
  - Building Responsibility, Equality and Dignity (BREAD) – Columbus
- South Carolina
  - Charleston Area Justice Ministry (CAJM) -- Charleston
  - MORE Justice—Columbia
- Tennessee
  - Justice Knox—Knoxville
- Virginia
  - Interfaith Movement Promoting Action by Congregations Together (IMPACT) – Charlottesville
  - Richmonders Involved to Strengthen our Communities (RISC) -- Richmond
