= Ernesto Cortes =

American community activist

Ernesto Cortés Jr.
- Occupations: Industrial Areas Foundation co-chair and executive director

Ernesto Cortés Jr. is the Industrial Areas Foundation (IAF) co-chair and executive director of the West / Southwest IAF regional network.

The IAF provides leadership training and civics education to poor and moderate-income people across the US and UK. Cortés has been instrumental in the building of over 30 grassroots organizations known for developing and training community leaders.

== Career ==
After attending an IAF training in Chicago and organizing in Wisconsin and Indiana in the early 1970s, Cortés returned to his hometown of San Antonio in 1974 to found Communities Organized for Public Service (COPS), the nationally recognized church-based grassroots organization of San Antonio's west and south side communities. This work has since expanded to include broad-based organizing projects across ten Southwestern states including Texas, California, Nevada, Arizona, Louisiana, Nebraska, New Mexico, Iowa, Oklahoma, and Mississippi. These organizations' diverse faith institutions are joined by schools, labor and professional associations, and non-profits. These organizations leveraged billions of dollars for poorer communities including $700 million in infrastructure improvements in the colonias (areas of Texas which lacked basic drainage systems) during the late 1980s and early 1990s, $2.8 billion in increased public funding to equalize school funding in Texas in the mid-1980s, and $10 million in state funding for workforce development projects equipping underemployed adults with job training options. Millions more have been invested (and saved) in community-level infrastructure, healthcare reform and housing.

Cortés envisioned and launched the Alliance Schools strategy - a lauded initiative to engage communities of adults in public education. Identifying and training parent and community leaders to change the culture of their schools, the Alliance Schools have built a broad base of support for public education, both locally and statewide. Alliance Schools have been successful in raising test scores by building a culture of collaboration, as recently documented by the Annenberg Institute for School Reform.

Assisted by Cortés, the West / Southwest IAF established ten independently operating Labor Market Intermediaries by building the capacity of constituents to create the requisite political will. The graduation rates of these projects consistently outpace those of the community colleges with which they partner, helping over 12,000 low wage employees become higher-paid knowledge workers equipped with the needed skills in high demand fields. These projects have additionally been shown to provide a positive Return On Investment for public entities that invest in them. He also assisted in several living wage campaigns in Texas which raised the wages of over 10,000 workers in the Rio Grande Valley, in addition to those in Austin and San Antonio. A study of Cortes's work with IAF in Texas, Cold Anger, was written by Mary Beth Rogers. Dozens of other books further describe his work in and beyond Texas.

Cortés coordinates regional and national leadership schools that train grassroots leaders to develop community organizations based on access to political power through relationship building, and social justice initiatives. He has helped community members win water and sewage facility and other infrastructure improvements, election campaigns, and increased access to affordable housing.

== Honors ==
In 1984, he was awarded a MacArthur fellowship, also known as a "genius grant." In 1996, he was the recipient of an honorary doctoral degree from the University of Houston. Besides, he received the prestigious 4th Annual Heinz Award in Public Policy in 1999 and completed fellowships at the JFK School of Government at Harvard and the Department of Urban Studies and Planning at MIT. He has been awarded honorary degrees from Southern Methodist University, University of St. Edwards in Austin and Rutgers University in New Jersey. In 2009 he received an honorary Doctor of Laws degree from Princeton University. In 2015, as the Princeton University Stewart Fellow in Religion, he co-taught a course on Religion and Power in Grassroots Democracy.
