= United Neighborhood Organization =

Non-profit organization in Chicago

- Formation: 1984; 42 years ago
- Location: Chicago, United States

The United Neighborhood Organization (UNO) is a non-profit organization in Chicago, Illinois. UNO's mission is to lead the transformation of the Hispanic community toward an educated, powerful and prosperous citizenry by engaging and challenging it to redefine its potential and its legacy in metropolitan Chicago and the United States.

== History of UNO ==
In 1984, UNO began as a grassroots effort between community groups and churches to fulfill the developmental needs of the Hispanic community in Chicago. UNO believes in the potential to transform entire neighborhoods therefore giving families a better chance at achieving the American dream. UNO focuses on three principles: improving education, promoting citizenship and cultivating leaders, all to ensure the economic advancement for generations of Hispanics. In 1998, UNO founded the UNO Charter School Network (UCSN), a network of 16 charter schools (13 elementary schools and 3 high schools) with over 8,000 students. Additionally, UNO provides two professional development programs Metropolitan Leadership Institute (MLI) and the Corporate Leadership Institute (CLI), to galvanize action among working Hispanic professionals interested in leadership roles in the public, private, and corporate sectors.

In later years, UNO expanded its scope of services to promote health and wellness in the community through a 5k race known as the Carrera de los Muertos/Race of the Dead, which in 2014 had over 5,700 participants. UNO also expanded to provide jobs to members of the community through the UNO Janitorial and Maintenance Service (UNO JaMS), which is a social enterprise offering full maintenance and cleaning services.

== Educational Services (K-12) ==
The UNO Charter School Network (UCSN) was founded in 1998 when UNO recognized the need to bolster public education in Chicago as a way to effect positive change in predominantly Hispanic communities. The first school, Octavio Paz Elementary was in Pilsen, Chicago and has since grown to 13 K-8 elementary schools and 3 high schools. UCSN's vision is to develop a diverse group of intellectually curious and passionate civic leaders who act with integrity and who compete and excel, locally, nationally, and globally.

State funding for the organization was cut off in April 2013 by Illinois governor Pat Quinn's administration after a possible conflict in interest by a high-ranking UNO executive, but was restored six weeks later after the organization pledged to avoid future conflicts of interest. In July 2015, "the Chicago City Council's Latino Caucus called for the resignation of Richard Rodriguez, a former Daley administration official who oversees the schools." noting that Richard Rodriguez is the lone remaining member of the original UNO board, which was forced to split after being investigated by the Securities and Exchange Commission and the Cook County State's Attorney's Office

In 2013 employees at UCSN unionized, joining the Chicago Alliance of Charter School Teachers and Staff (Chicago ACTS).

List of UNO Charter Schools:

- Maj Hector P. Garcia MD High School (Archer Heights) Of its class of 2012, 20% were undocumented immigrants
- UNO – PFC Omar E.Torres Campus
- UNO – SPC Daniel Zizumbo Campus
- UNO – Carlos Fuentes Elementary School
- UNO – Officer Donald J. Marquez Elementary School
- UNO – Soccer Academy Elementary School
- UNO – Bartolome de Las Casas Elementary School
- UNO – Esmeralda Santiago Elementary School
- UNO – Rufino Tamayo Elementary School
- UNO – Sandra Cisneros Elementary School
- UNO – Octavio Paz Elementary School
- UNO – Soccer Academy High School
- UNO – Rogers Park Elementary School
- UNO – Rogers Park High School
- UNO – Galewood Elementary School
- UNO – Brighton Park Elementary School

== Professional Development Programs ==
The United Neighborhood Organization (UNO) created the Metropolitan Leadership Institute (MLI) to build public leadership within the Hispanic population of metropolitan Chicago. The organization has built a legacy of close to 400 leaders that today serve as public officials, educators, entrepreneurs, and that sit in the corporate boardrooms of some of the largest corporations in Chicago. Additionally, UNO launched the Corporate Leadership Institute (CLI) in 2015, a program aimed at developing the next generation of Chicago Latino leaders who will gain a deeper understanding of what it takes to succeed and play a vital role in the business community. UNO's CLI program is specifically designed for individuals with 5–15 years of experience in roles of increasing responsibility.

== Health and Wellness Initiatives ==
The Carrera de los Muertos 5k (Spanish for "Race of the Dead") was created in 2007 by joining community vibrancy and the tradition of the Day of the Dead/Día de los Muertos revelry with UNO’s commitment to family wellness and active lifestyles. Since its creation, the 5k race has grown to over 5,700 participants running through the streets of Pilsen, Chicago. The race usually occurs on 31 October.
