= Akwugo Emejulu =

Professor of Sociology

Prof Akwugo Emejulu
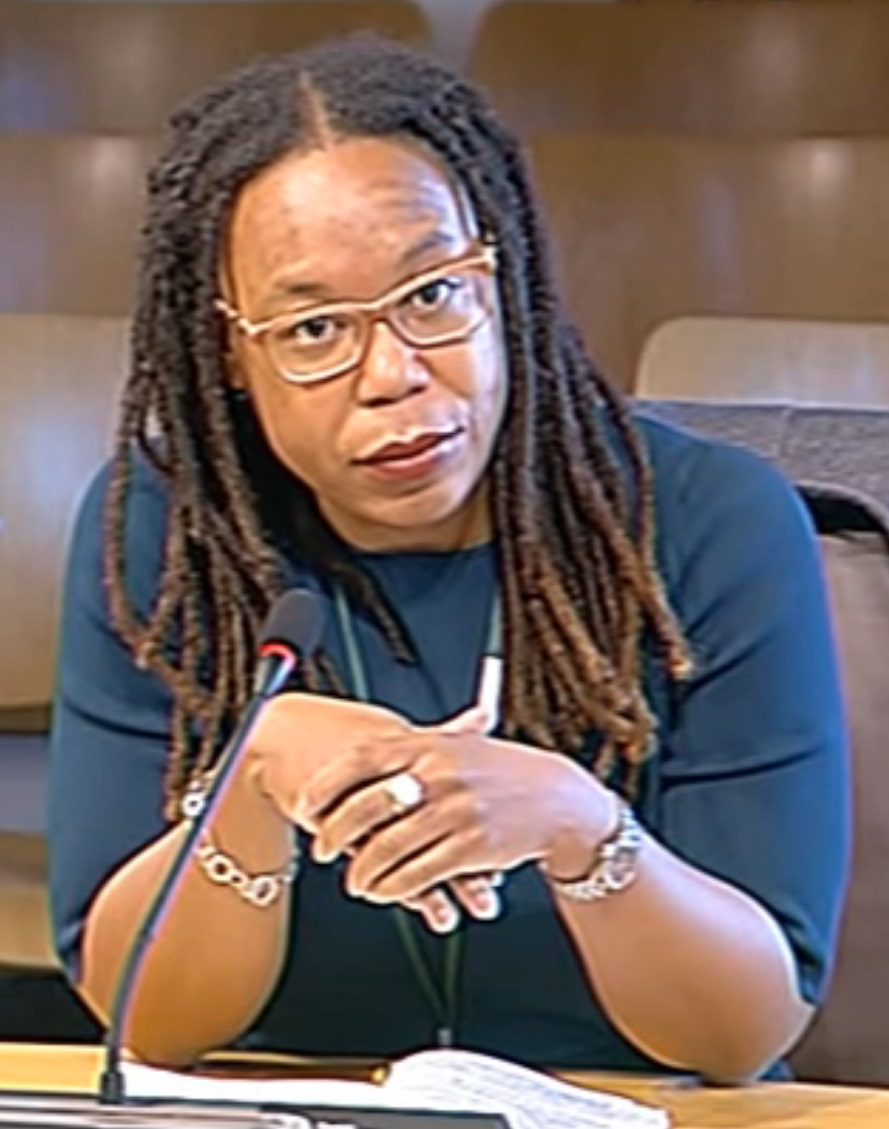
- Akwugo Emejulu testifies at the Equal Opportunities Committee of the Scottish Parliament in 2015

Academic background
- Education: University of Strathclyde; University of Glasgow; American University
- Thesis: Community development as discourse : analysing discourses, identities and social practices in the US and the UK (2010)

Academic work
- Institutions: University of Edinburgh; University of Warwick

Akwugo Emejulu is a British-American sociologist. She is a professor of sociology at the University of Sheffield. She focuses on political sociology, including inequalities across Europe and grassroots campaigns for women of colour.

== Early life and education ==
Emejulu completed her bachelor's degree in political science at the American University. She joined the University of Glasgow for her graduate studies, earning a Master of Philosophy in Urban Policy. She moved to the University of Strathclyde for her PhD, which she was awarded in 2010. Her PhD thesis considered community development as a discourse, identities and social practises in the US and UK.

== Career ==
Emejulu worked as a community organiser in the United States and United Kingdom. She was a senior lecturer at the University of Edinburgh. She was concerned that white supremacists influenced the Brexit vote. In 2017 Emejulu joined the University of Warwick as a professor of sociology.

In 2024, Emejulu moved to the University of Sheffield where she is a professor in the Department of Sociological Studies.

Previously, Emejulu was part of an Open Society Foundation project called Women of Colour Resist. The project looks to map the processes that women of colour use for activism. She works extensively with Leah Bassel at the University of Leicester.

== Books ==
- 2015 Community Development as Micropolitics: Comparing Theories, Policies and Politics in America and Britain
- 2017 Minority Women and Austerity: Survival and Resistance in France and Britain
- 2019 To Exist is to Resist: Black Feminism in Europe
- 2022 Fugitive Feminism
