= Communities Organized for Public Service =

Communities Organized for Public Service (COPS) is a coalition of non-partisan, grassroots community pressure groups based in San Antonio, Texas. It is an affiliate of the Industrial Areas Foundation (IAF), a group dedicated to grassroots community organizing that was developed by Saul Alinsky in Chicago during the 1930s. Founded in 1974, COPS’ mission is to secure specific, concrete standard of living improvements for neighborhoods traditionally neglected by city leaders through relational organizing.

Though advocating primarily for the interests of lower-middle class and working class Mexican-Americans on the city's west and south sides, COPS avoids the label of civil rights organization, instead projecting itself as an agent for fair and equitable distribution of city resources and services. The COPS organization included many Catholic clergy, as well as many women determined to improve their communities and opportunities for their children. COPS success in this endeavor to date is remarkable, amounting to over one billion dollars in group-sponsored projects and initiatives.
