= Tom Gaudette =

American activist

- Born: Thomas Aquinas Gaudette; March 8, 1923; Medford, Massachusetts
- Died: September 23, 1998 (age 75); Chicago, Illinois
- Education: Boston College
- Occupation: Community Organizer
- Known for: Founder of the: Mid-America Institute for Community Development
- Spouse: Kathryn Gaudette
- Children: 7 children

Thomas A. Gaudette (1923–1998) was a community organizer who worked in the Austin neighborhood of Chicago. Originally a businessman, Gaudette became interested in neighborhood organizing through his Catholic Church activism. Gaudette helped form a neighborhood group, along the lines of those organized by Saul Alinsky, on the far West Side of Chicago called Organization for a Better Austin. OBA was concerned with poor schools and neighborhood decline.

He also founded the Mid-America Institute for Community Organizations, and trained notable organizers like Shel Trapp and Gale Cincotta.

== Biography ==
Thomas A. Gaudette was born in 1923, in Medford, Massachusetts. His parents were Roman Catholic and his father a member of a railroad union, two critical influences on Tom Gaudette's later development as a community organizer. Gaudette served with distinction in the United States Army Air Corps in World War II, surviving the famous raid on Ploesti, Romania, and by war's end earning the Distinguished Flying Cross, the Air Medal, and a Presidential Unit Citation. After the war, he graduated in 1949 from Boston College.

By the 1950s Tom Gaudette and his wife Kay had settled in Chicago, where he worked as a vice-president for the Admiral Corporation. Here, he was introduced to community organizing, for his new home had become a center of community organizing because of the work of Saul Alinsky and the Roman Catholic Church.

Experienced in labor organizing and trained in sociology, Saul Alinsky (1909–1972) inspired the community organizing movement in the United States. Alinsky-style community organizing is dedicated to creating grass-roots organizations led by local people with the end of combating government bureaucracies or businesses or other powers unresponsive to local concerns. The organizer, in the classic Alinsky sense, does not assume leadership of community organizations. Instead, he or she may inspire local communities to action, but the organizer's real job is to identify leaders who can direct the community organizations, so that communities themselves can truly determine their own direction. The Alinsky maxim "Never do for the people what they can do for themselves" aptly expresses this approach to community organizing. Identified with neither socialist thought nor the New Left of the 1960s, community organizing is thus a populist movement possessed of a profound faith in the democratic abilities of local communities to control their destiny. A major correlative belief is that, when local communities themselves address their problems, social justice and true democracy are realized.

In 1939, Alinsky successfully organized the Back of the Yards neighborhood in the slums of the stockyards area of Chicago. His Back of the Yards Neighborhood Council successfully fought for major civic improvements and stands as a landmark success in the history of Alinsky's organizing. It still exists today. An important reason for the success of Alinsky and the Back of the Yards Council was the strong support of the Roman Catholic Diocese of Chicago, with its advocacy of social activism. Auxiliary Bishop Bernard Sheil championed Alinsky's work in the Back of the Yards, and such other notable Chicago Roman Catholic Church leaders as Cardinal Samuel Stritch and Monsignor John Egan would continue to provide him with invaluable moral and financial support. In short, Alinsky's methods of community organizing would be rooted in socially active churches, most notably Roman Catholic.

It was in this context that Tom Gaudette entered community organizing in Chicago. Active in their Roman Catholic parish, Tom and Kay Gaudette's involvement in the Christian Family Movement led to their joining the Chatham-Avalon Park Community Council in 1957. Tom Gaudette emerged as a leader of this organization, serving as its president and spokesman in fights over such issues as zoning restrictions and controls on taverns in Chatham-Avalon Park. Another key issue, dominant in the Chicago of the 1950s and 1960s, was the African-American integration of white, often ethnic, neighborhoods, with subsequent white flight to the suburbs. Through his work in these areas, Gaudette met Father Egan, who, as head of the Chicago Archdiocesan Conservation Council concerned with integration, was beginning his rise in the ranks of Roman Catholic social activism. Impressed with Guadette's character and leadership abilities, Egan believed him the right person to organize an area that the monsignor had targeted for such work: Chicago's West Town, a Polish-American community. Saul Alinsky had refused Egan's earlier request to organize the area, citing the lack of money and an organizer to carry out the work. Egan responded by raising money for the project from the archdiocese and sending Gaudette to Alinsky to interview for the position of organizer for West Town. After an interview memorable for the profane give and take between the two, Alinsky hired Gaudette in 1961, leading to an eleven-year association between the men. Alinsky schooled Gaudette in community organizing, making him one of the handful of organizers whom Alinsky personally trained.

Gaudette went to work for Alinsky on Chicago's west side, organizing the Northwest Community Organization (NCO) in 1961, one of the hallmark Alinsky community organizations in Chicago. NCO, under Gaudette's tutelage, fought the extensive demolition of housing planned for the area because of urban renewal. After working with NCO, Gaudette, at the request of Father Egan and other clergy, turned his attention to South Austin in south Chicago. His work here led to the Organization for a Better Austin (OBA) in 1966, notable for the fact that it brought together African-Americans and whites in an area tormented by racial strife. OBA had its most effective results in the improvement of the neighborhood school system.

Despite efforts by Alinsky to have him undertake organizing efforts in other cities, Gaudette refused to do so. Chicago would remain his base of operations, even after Tom Gaudette founded the Mid-America Institute for Community Development in 1972, the same year that Alinsky died. Gaudette used the institute (operated out of his Chicago home) for his work throughout the country and even in Asia as an independent trainer and teacher of community organizers. Monsignor Egan credited Tom Gaudette with inspiring more community organizers than any other person, many of whom originally worked with him. These included Gail Cincotta, who was a member of OBA, and later would become one of the more successful organizers in the United States. She, along with Shel Trapp, founded the National Training and Information Center and National People's Action. Cincotta's most remarkable accomplishment was her successful campaign for the passage of the Community Reinvestment Act, which the United States Congress passed in 1976. The Act banned the banking practice of "redlining" poor neighborhoods. Another one of Gaudette's more important successes has been his work with John Baumann, S.J., and the Pacific Institute for Community Organization, of Oakland, which stands as one of the more active community organizing networks in the United States today. Gaudette was also responsible for community organizations in Seattle, Kansas City, and Baltimore, among other places.

On his death in 1998, Tom Gaudette left a considerable legacy to the work of community organizing, attested to by the persons he trained, as well as by his philosophy of organizing summarized in this eloquent quotation:

What is this goal of power? It means this sense of community. Dancing, singing, fighting, taking care of each other, helping each other out.

== Thomas A. Gaudette Papers ==
Various documents related to Thomas A. Gaudette are archived at Loyola Marymount University as part of its Center for the Study of Los Angeles collection.
