= Edward T. Chambers =

American community organizer (1930–2015)

Edward Thomas Chambers (April 2, 1930 – April 26, 2015) was the executive director of the Industrial Areas Foundation from 1972 to 2009, a community organizing group founded by Saul Alinsky. Chambers was born in Clarion, Iowa to Thomas Chambers and Hazella Downing. He is credited with developing systematic training of organizers and leaders of congregation-based community organizations, and establishing relational meetings (or "one-on-ones") as a critical practice of organizers. He is the author of Roots for Radicals: Organizing for Power, Action, and Justice (Continuum International Publishing Group, 2003, ISBN 0-8264-1499-0.). A memorial article in The New Yorker called him "community organizing’s unforgiving hero." He died of heart failure in Drimoleague, Ireland in 2015.
