= Community Service Organization =

American civil rights organization

- Abbreviation: CSO
- Founded: 1947
- Founder: Fred Ross Sr.; Edward Roybal; Antonio Ríos
- Type: Grassroots civil rights organization
- Purpose: Empower Mexican American and Latino communities through voter registration, citizenship education, community organizing, and civil rights advocacy
- Headquarters: Boyle Heights, Los Angeles, California, U.S.
- Region served: Mexican American communities in California (later expanded)

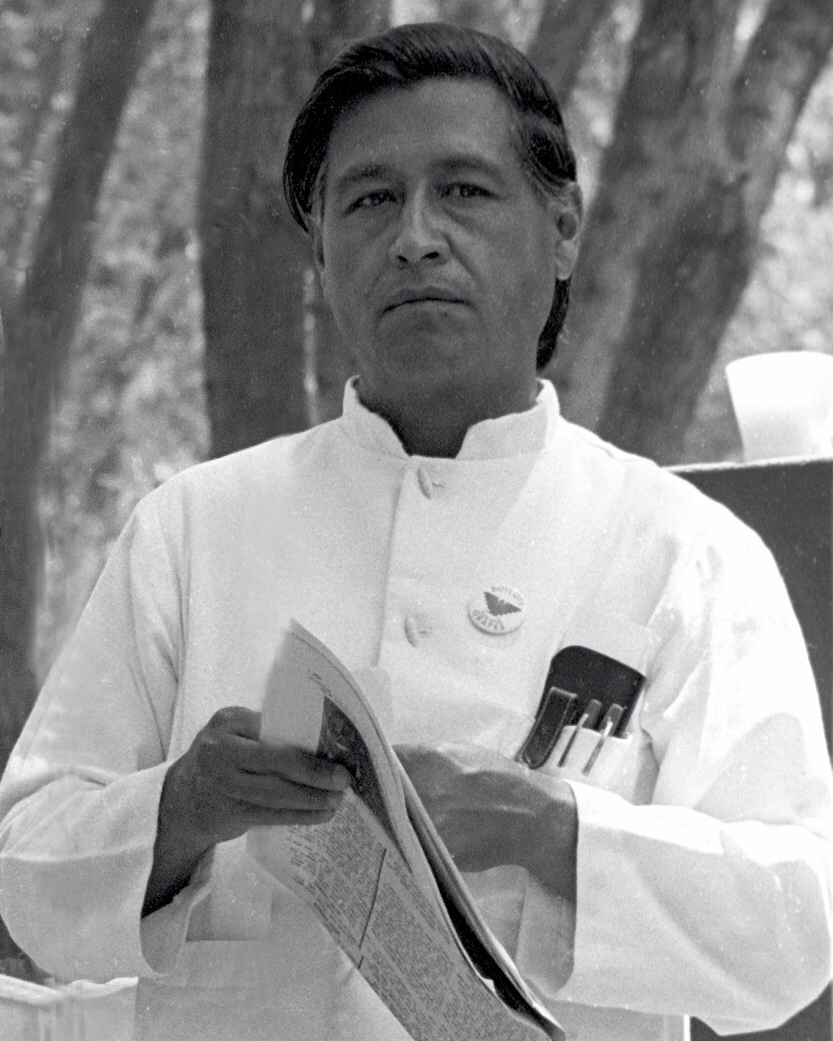
César Chávez at a United Farm Workers rally in Delano, 1974

The Community Service Organization (founded 1947) is a California Latino civil rights organization, most famous for training Cesar Chavez and Dolores Huerta.

== Founding and early success ==
The Community Service Organization (CSO) was a grassroots civil rights group founded in 1947 in Los Angeles by community organizer Fred Ross, Antonio Rios, and political leader Edward Roybal. With financial support from Saul Alinsky’s Industrial Areas Foundation, the CSO organized around discrimination in housing, employment, and education. It also promoted political engagement and offered citizenship classes and self-help programs. It became an influential civil rights organization for Latinos in California in the middle of the 20th century.

The CSO, in its early days, existed at a time when Mexican Americans faced discrimination and disenfranchisement in the United States. In response, Rios, Ross, and Roybal organized voter-registration drives and other community campaigns and recruited local residents into leadership roles.

An early success came in 1949 when the CSO launched a get-out-the-vote campaign in Los Angeles’ Latino neighborhoods. Roybal was the first Mexican American elected to the Los Angeles City Council in the twentieth century. He was later elected to the U.S. House of Representatives.

The CSO was interracial from its inception and remained diverse through the 1950s. It gained grassroots support from both experienced Mexican-American activists and veterans returning from World War II. Additionally, the CSO received backing from other Los Angeles communities, including African-Americans, Japanese-Americans, and Jewish-Americans.

By the early 1950s, the CSO had expanded across California, establishing branches in San Jose, Oakland, and the San Joaquin Valley. The organization trained thousands of activists who held house meetings, conducted voter-registration drives, demonstrated against police brutality, and advocated for civil rights reforms.

== Cesar Chavez and expansion of the CSO ==
Fred Ross recruited Cesar Chavez to the CSO in 1952. While with the CSO, Chavez gained experience in voter registration and door-to-door organizing. He also built community coalitions and mobilized Latino workers. According to Roger Bruns, the work Chavez did with the CSO laid the groundwork for his later activism in the farm labor movement.

In 1955, the CSO recruited Dolores Huerta, a former teacher and activist, to run its Stockton chapter. Huerta lobbied for farmworker rights and pushed for state disability assistance for agricultural laborers. Chavez and Huerta first met through the CSO. Both later became leaders of the United Farm Workers.

== Advocacy and social services ==
The CSO provided social services to Latino communities, including:

- Working to improve educational opportunities for Mexican American students.
- Assisting immigrants with legal support and offering citizenship education.
- Providing job placement assistance and access to affordable healthcare.
- Campaigning against police misconduct and racial injustice.

The CSO's grassroots model emphasized self-reliance, and encouraged community members to become leaders and activists in their own neighborhoods.

== Conflict and the departure of Cesar Chavez ==
In the late 1950s, Chavez was organizing CSO chapters in Oxnard, California, where farmworkers faced difficult labor conditions due to the Bracero Program. Many local Mexican American workers were displaced by low-wage bracero laborers, and Chavez began organizing protests against the program.

Chavez proposed that the CSO establish a labor division for farmworkers. However, the CSO Board of Directors rejected the idea, insisting that the organization remain focused on social services rather than labor organizing. Chavez resigned from the CSO in 1962 and later helped establish the organization that became the United Farm Workers.

Dolores Huerta and other CSO members later joined Chavez in building the farm labor movement. The CSO, however, continued its original mission of voter registration drives, assistance to immigrants, and advocacy against police brutality.

== Legacy ==
The CSO trained organizers including Cesar Chavez and Dolores Huerta, who later became leaders of the United Farm Workers. The organization also developed voter-registration and community-organizing methods that were used by later Latino civil-rights groups.

Community Service Organization, now known as Centro CSO remains active. The group, which is based in Boyle Heights, has protested police killings of Chicanos, privatization of education, promoted the environmental cleanup of Exide, and for the rights of the undocumented.

The archives of the Community Service Organization are held at Stanford University as well as at California State University, Northridge in the Library's Special Collections and Archives.
