= Faith in Action =

U.S. network of faith-based community organizations

- Formation: 1972; 54 years ago
- Founder: John Baumann
- Type: Nonprofit
- Purpose: Community organizing for progressive public policy change
- Headquarters: Oakland, California
- Methods: Faith-based community organizing
- Executive Director: Bishop Dwayne Royster
- Revenue: $6.33 million (2024)
- Endowment: $18.7 million
- Staff: 2023
- Website: www.faithinaction.org

Faith in Action, formerly known as the Pacific Institute for Community Organization (PICO National Network), is a national network of progressive faith-based community organizations in the United States. The organization is headquartered in Oakland, California, with additional offices in San Diego and Washington, D.C. The organization's stated aim is "a society free of economic oppression, racism and discrimination in which every person lives in a safe and healthy environment, is respected and included, and has agency over the decisions that shape their lives."

Faith in Action supports full citizenship for undocumented immigrants. The organization also supports universal health care. MacKenzie Scott, ex-wife of Amazon founder Jeff Bezos, is a major donor to the organization.

== History ==
Faith in Action was founded in 1972 by Fr John Baumann, SJ, as the Pacific Institute for Community Organization (PICO), headquartered in Oakland, California. In the late 1960s, Baumann had worked with community organizing projects in Chicago, where he became familiar with Saul Alinsky's ideas. During the 1970s, Faith in Action worked with five neighborhood-based organizations, recruiting individuals and families. As neighborhoods experienced the economic and social upheavals of that decade, the neighborhood-based model of organizing became less viable as communities fractured.

Following a staff retreat in 1984, Faith in Action shifted to a congregation-based model based in part on the experience of COPS, a federation in San Antonio, Texas, developed by Alinsky's Industrial Areas Foundation. As it expanded beyond the West Coast, in 2004 PICO characterized its acronym as standing for People Improving Communities through Organizing. In 2005, it renamed itself PICO National Network, emphasizing the autonomy of its affiliated organizations, and its role developing national strategy, training, and consultation.

The shift to faith-based organizing has emphasized the importance of religious culture to Faith in Action. Its base in northern California meant that Faith in Action could draw on the traditions of a variety of denominations. Sociology professor Richard Wood, who serves on Faith in Action's board of directors, writes that this includes "the social Christianity of the historic black churches, the Social Gospel and Christian realist perspectives in moderate and liberal Protestantism, the strongly evangelical but socially responsible orientation of the Church of God in Christ, and the intellectual resources, working-class commitments, and Hispanic cultural ties of Roman Catholicism."

In May 2018, PICO National Network officially changed its name to Faith in Action.

== Activities ==
PICO's California Project led a $190 million public bond initiative for public school infrastructure. PICO's New Voices Campaign, launched in 2004, seeks to help low-income communities have an impact at the national level on such issues as immigration reform, health care, education, and rebuilding the Gulf Coast in the wake of Hurricane Katrina. In October 2008, PICO announced plans for a mid-November meeting in Washington, D.C., in which its affiliates would lobby Congress, the United States Treasury Department, and the Federal Deposit Insurance Corporation to help people keep their homes when facing foreclosure.

== Funding ==
The Ford Foundation is a major donor to Faith in Action. In 2015, Faith in Action was added to the list of the Democracy Alliance's recommended funding targets. Faith in Action has received funding from the Open Society Foundations.

== See also ==
- Gamaliel Foundation
