= How to Read a Book =

1940 book by Mortimer J. Adler

- First edition (publ. Simon & Schuster)
- Author: Mortimer J. Adler
- Publisher: Miller J
- Publication date: 1940

How to Read a Book is a book by the American philosopher Mortimer J. Adler. Originally published in 1940, it was heavily revised for a 1972 edition, co-authored by Adler with editor Charles Van Doren. The 1972 revision gives guidelines for critically reading good and great books of any tradition. In addition, it deals with genres (including, but not limited to, poetry, history, science, and fiction), as well as inspectional and syntopical reading.

== Overview of the 1972 edition ==
How to Read a Book is divided into four parts, each consisting of several chapters.

=== Part 1: The Dimensions of Reading ===
Here, Adler sets forth his method for reading a non-fiction book in order to gain understanding. He claims that three distinct approaches, or readings, must all be made in order to get the most possible out of a book, but that performing these three levels of readings does not necessarily mean reading the book three times, as the experienced reader will be able to do all three in the course of reading the book just once. Adler names the readings "structural", "interpretative", and "critical", in that order.

Structural stage: The first stage of analytical reading is concerned with understanding the structure and purpose of the book. It begins with determining the basic topic and type of the book being read, so as to better anticipate the contents and comprehend the book from the very beginning. Adler says that the reader must distinguish between practical and theoretical books, as well as determining the field of study that the book addresses. Further, Adler says that the reader must note any divisions in the book, and that these are not restricted to the divisions laid out in the table of contents. Lastly, the reader must find out what problems the author is trying to solve.

Interpretive stage: The second stage of analytical reading involves constructing the author's arguments. This first requires the reader to note and understand any special phrases and terms that the author uses. Once that is done, Adler says that the reader should find and work to understand each proposition that the author advances, as well as the author's support for those propositions.

Critical stage: In the third stage of analytical reading, Adler directs the reader to critique the book. He asserts that upon understanding the author's propositions and arguments, the reader has been elevated to the author's level of understanding and is now able (and obligated) to judge the book's merit and accuracy. Adler advocates judging books based on the soundness of their arguments. Adler says that one may not disagree with an argument unless one can find fault in its reasoning, facts, or premises, though one is free to dislike it in any case.

=== Part 2: The Third Level of Reading: Analytical Reading ===
Adler explains for whom the book is intended, defines different classes of reading, and tells which classes will be addressed. He also makes a brief argument favoring the Great Books, and explains his reasons for writing How to Read a Book.

There are three types of knowledge: practical, informational, and comprehensive. He discusses the methods of acquiring knowledge, concluding that 1. practical knowledge, though teachable, cannot be truly mastered without experience, 2. that only informational knowledge can be gained by one whose understanding equals the author's, and 3. that comprehension (insight) is best learned from the person who first achieved said understanding – an "original communication" with the source of understanding.

The idea that communication directly from those who first discovered an idea is the best way of gaining understanding is Adler's argument for reading the Great Books; that any book that does not represent original communication is inferior, as a source, to the original, and that any teacher, save those who discovered the subject he or she teaches, is inferior to the Great Books as a source of comprehension.

Adler spends a good deal of this first section explaining why he was compelled to write this book. He asserts that very few people can read a book for understanding, but that he believes that most are capable of it, given the right instruction and the will to do so. It is his intent to provide that instruction. He takes time to tell the reader about how he believes that the educational system has failed to teach students the art of reading well, up to and including undergraduate, university-level institutions. He concludes that, due to these shortcomings in formal education, it falls upon individuals to cultivate these abilities in themselves. Throughout this section, he relates anecdotes and summaries of his experience in education as support for these assertions.

=== Part 3: Approaches to Different Kinds of Reading Matter ===
In this part, Adler briefly discusses the differences in approaching various kinds of literature and suggests reading several other books. He explains a method of approaching the Great Books – read the books that influenced a given author prior to reading works by that author – and gives several examples of that method.

=== Part 4: The Ultimate Goals of Reading ===
The last part of the book covers the fourth level of reading: syntopical reading. At this stage, the reader broadens and deepens his or her knowledge on a given subject – e.g., love, war, particle physics, etc. – by reading several books on that subject. In the final pages of this part, the author expounds on the philosophical benefits of reading: "growth of the mind", fuller experience as a conscious being...

== Reading list (1972 edition) ==
Appendix A in the 1972 edition provided the following recommended reading list:

1. Homer – Iliad, Odyssey
2. The Old Testament
3. Aeschylus – Tragedies
4. Sophocles – Tragedies
5. Herodotus – Histories
6. Euripides – Tragedies
7. Thucydides – History of the Peloponnesian War
8. Hippocrates – Medical Writings
9. Aristophanes – Comedies
10. Plato – Dialogues
11. Aristotle – Works
12. Epicurus – Letter to Herodotus; Letter to Menoecus
13. Euclid – Elements
14. Archimedes – Works
15. Apollonius of Perga – Conic Sections
16. Cicero – Works
17. Lucretius – On the Nature of Things
18. Virgil – Works
19. Horace – Works
20. Livy – History of Rome
21. Ovid – Works
22. Plutarch – Parallel Lives; Moralia
23. Tacitus – Histories; Annals; Agricola; Germania
24. Nicomachus of Gerasa – Introduction to Arithmetic
25. Epictetus – Discourses; Encheiridion
26. Ptolemy – Almagest
27. Lucian – Works
28. Marcus Aurelius – Meditations
29. Galen – On the Natural Faculties
30. The New Testament
31. Plotinus – The Enneads
32. St. Augustine – "On the Teachers"; Confessions; City of God; On Christian Doctrine
33. The Song of Roland
34. The Nibelungenlied
35. The Saga of Burnt Njál
36. St. Thomas Aquinas – Summa Theologica
37. Dante Alighieri – The Divine Comedy; The New Life; On Monarchy
38. Geoffrey Chaucer – Troilus and Criseyde; The Canterbury Tales
39. Leonardo da Vinci – Notebooks
40. Niccolò Machiavelli – The Prince; Discourses on the First Ten Books of Livy
41. Desiderius Erasmus – The Praise of Folly
42. Nicolaus Copernicus – On the Revolutions of the Heavenly Spheres
43. Thomas More – Utopia
44. Martin Luther – Table Talk; Three Treatises
45. François Rabelais – Gargantua and Pantagruel
46. John Calvin – Institutes of the Christian Religion
47. Michel de Montaigne – Essays
48. William Gilbert – On the Loadstone and Magnetic Bodies
49. Miguel de Cervantes – Don Quixote
50. Edmund Spenser – Prothalamion; The Faerie Queene
51. Francis Bacon – Essays; Advancement of Learning; Novum Organum, New Atlantis
52. William Shakespeare – Poetry and Plays
53. Galileo Galilei – Starry Messenger; Dialogues Concerning Two New Sciences
54. Johannes Kepler – Epitome of Copernican Astronomy; Concerning the Harmonies of the World
55. William Harvey – On the Motion of the Heart and Blood in Animals; On the Circulation of the Blood; On the Generation of Animals
56. Thomas Hobbes – Leviathan
57. René Descartes – Rules for the Direction of the Mind; Discourse on the Method; Geometry; Meditations on First Philosophy
58. John Milton – Works
59. Molière – Comedies
60. Blaise Pascal – The Provincial Letters; Pensees; Scientific Treatises
61. Christiaan Huygens – Treatise on Light
62. Benedict de Spinoza – Ethics
63. John Locke – Letter Concerning Toleration; Of Civil Government; Essay Concerning Human Understanding; Thoughts Concerning Education
64. Jean Baptiste Racine – Tragedies
65. Isaac Newton – Mathematical Principles of Natural Philosophy; Optics
66. Gottfried Wilhelm Leibniz – Discourse on Metaphysics; New Essays Concerning Human Understanding; Monadology
67. Daniel Defoe – Robinson Crusoe
68. Jonathan Swift – A Tale of a Tub; Journal to Stella; Gulliver's Travels; A Modest Proposal
69. William Congreve – The Way of the World
70. George Berkeley – Principles of Human Knowledge
71. Alexander Pope – Essay on Criticism; Rape of the Lock; Essay on Man
72. Charles de Secondat, baron de Montesquieu – Persian Letters; Spirit of Laws
73. Voltaire – Letters on the English; Candide; Philosophical Dictionary; Micromegas
74. Henry Fielding – Joseph Andrews; Tom Jones
75. Samuel Johnson – The Vanity of Human Wishes; Dictionary; Rasselas; The Lives of the Poets
76. David Hume – A Treatise of Human Nature; Essays Moral and Political; An Enquiry Concerning Human Understanding
77. Jean-Jacques Rousseau – On the Origin of Inequality; On the Political Economy; Emile – or, On Education, The Social Contract
78. Laurence Sterne – Tristram Shandy; A Sentimental Journey through France and Italy
79. Adam Smith – The Theory of Moral Sentiments; The Wealth of Nations
80. Immanuel Kant – Critique of Pure Reason; Fundamental Principles of the Metaphysics of Morals; Critique of Practical Reason; The Science of Right; Critique of Judgment; Perpetual Peace
81. Edward Gibbon – The Decline and Fall of the Roman Empire; Autobiography
82. James Boswell – Journal; Life of Samuel Johnson, Ll.D.
83. Antoine de Lavoisier – Traité Élémentaire de Chimie (Elements of Chemistry)
84. Alexander Hamilton, John Jay, and James Madison – Federalist Papers
85. Jeremy Bentham – An Introduction to the Principles of Morals and Legislation; Theory of Fictions
86. Johann Wolfgang von Goethe – Faust; Poetry and Truth
87. Jean Baptiste Joseph Fourier – Analytical Theory of Heat
88. Georg Wilhelm Friedrich Hegel – Phenomenology of Spirit; Philosophy of Right; Lectures on the Philosophy of History
89. William Wordsworth – Poems
90. Samuel Taylor Coleridge – Poems; Biographia Literaria
91. Jane Austen – Pride and Prejudice; Emma
92. Carl von Clausewitz – On War
93. Stendhal – The Red and the Black; The Charterhouse of Parma; On Love
94. Lord Byron – Don Juan (poem)
95. Arthur Schopenhauer – Studies in Pessimism
96. Michael Faraday – The Chemical History of a Candle; Experimental Researches in Electricity
97. Charles Lyell – Principles of Geology
98. Auguste Comte – The Positive Philosophy
99. Honoré de Balzac – Père Goriot; Eugenie Grandet
100. Ralph Waldo Emerson – Representative Men; Essays; Journal
101. Nathaniel Hawthorne – The Scarlet Letter
102. Alexis de Tocqueville – Democracy in America
103. John Stuart Mill – A System of Logic; On Liberty; Representative Government; Utilitarianism; The Subjection of Women; Autobiography
104. Charles Darwin – The Origin of Species; The Descent of Man; Autobiography
105. Charles Dickens – Pickwick Papers; David Copperfield; Hard Times
106. Claude Bernard – Introduction to the Study of Experimental Medicine
107. Henry David Thoreau – Civil Disobedience; Walden
108. Karl Marx – Capital; Communist Manifesto
109. George Eliot – Adam Bede; Middlemarch
110. Herman Melville – Moby-Dick; Billy Budd
111. Fyodor Dostoevsky – Crime and Punishment; The Idiot; The Brothers Karamazov
112. Gustave Flaubert – Madame Bovary; Three Stories
113. Henrik Ibsen – Plays
114. Leo Tolstoy – War and Peace; Anna Karenina; What is Art?; Twenty-Three Tales
115. Mark Twain – The Adventures of Huckleberry Finn; The Mysterious Stranger
116. William James – The Principles of Psychology; The Varieties of Religious Experience; Pragmatism; Essays in Radical Empiricism
117. Henry James – The American; The Ambassadors
118. Friedrich Wilhelm Nietzsche – Thus Spoke Zarathustra; Beyond Good and Evil; The Genealogy of Morals; The Will to Power
119. Jules Henri Poincaré – Science and Hypothesis; Science and Method
120. Sigmund Freud – The Interpretation of Dreams; Introductory Lectures on Psychoanalysis; Civilization and Its Discontents; New Introductory Lectures on Psychoanalysis
121. George Bernard Shaw – Plays and Prefaces
122. Max Planck – Origin and Development of the Quantum Theory; Where Is Science Going?; Scientific Autobiography
123. Henri Bergson – Time and Free Will; Matter and Memory; Creative Evolution; The Two Sources of Morality and Religion
124. John Dewey – How We Think; Democracy and Education; Experience and Nature; Logic: the Theory of Inquiry
125. Alfred North Whitehead – An Introduction to Mathematics; Science and the Modern World; The Aims of Education and Other Essays; Adventures of Ideas
126. George Santayana – The Life of Reason; Skepticism and Animal Faith; Persons and Places
127. Vladimir Lenin – The State and Revolution
128. Marcel Proust – Remembrance of Things Past
129. Bertrand Russell – The Problems of Philosophy; The Analysis of Mind; An Inquiry into Meaning and Truth; Human Knowledge, Its Scope and Limits
130. Thomas Mann – The Magic Mountain; Joseph and His Brothers
131. Albert Einstein – The Meaning of Relativity; On the Method of Theoretical Physics; The Evolution of Physics
132. James Joyce – 'The Dead' in Dubliners; A Portrait of the Artist as a Young Man; Ulysses
133. Jacques Maritain – Art and Scholasticism; The Degrees of Knowledge; The Rights of Man and Natural Law; True Humanism
134. Franz Kafka – The Trial; The Castle
135. Arnold J. Toynbee – A Study of History; Civilization on Trial
136. Jean-Paul Sartre – Nausea; No Exit; Being and Nothingness
137. Aleksandr Solzhenitsyn – The First Circle; The Cancer Ward

== Publication data ==
- Mortimer Adler (1940), How to Read a Book: The Art of Getting a Liberal Education (registration required), OCLC 822771595
  - 1966 edition (registration required) published with subtitle A Guide to Reading the Great Books, ISBN 978-0-671-21209-4. OCLC 500166716.
  - 1972 revised edition (registration required), coauthor Charles Van Doren, New York: Simon and Schuster. ISBN 1-567-31010-9. OCLC 788925161.

== See also ==
- How to Read Literature Like a Professor – A book on literature interpretation
- Reading (process)
