= Aristotle for Everybody =

1978 book by Mortimer Adler

Aristotle for Everybody: Difficult Thought Made Easy
- Cover of the first edition
- Author: Mortimer J. Adler
- Language: English
- Subject: Aristotle
- Publisher: Macmillan Publishers
- Publication date: 1978
- Publication place: United States
- Media type: Print (Hardcover and Paperback)
- Pages: 206 (paperback edition)
- ISBN: 978-0684838236

Aristotle for Everybody: Difficult Thought Made Easy is a 1978 book by the philosopher Mortimer J. Adler. It serves as an "introduction to common sense" and philosophic thinking, for which there is "no better teacher than Aristotle," and which is "everybody's business," in his opinion.

== Summary ==
Aristotle was a "common sense" philosopher whose depth and uniqueness of thought made his common sense "uncommon, according to Adler's thesis, in contrast to his teacher Plato, whose ideas may be considered more abstract and esoteric. While Adler criticizes Aristotle for accepting the conventional views of his day regarding the supposed inferiority of women, and Greek slavery, he nonetheless asserts that Aristotle is the best introduction to philosophical thinking and a philosopher with insights that are still relevant and useful today. Adler acknowledges that Aristotle's own writings are difficult for a layperson, and so the author decided to create a more accessible introduction to Aristotle's thought.

"Man the Maker" focuses on the use of "productive reason", Aristotle's views on excellence in craftsmanship (the ancient Greek concept of techne). "Man the Doer" on "practical reason", Aristotle's ethics and his concept of moral virtue (both personal and political), and "Man the Knower" on "theoretical reason", knowledge (epistemology) and logic.

The final part of the book is called "Difficult Philosophical Questions", and in it Adler tries to apply Aristotle's views to infinity, eternity, the immateriality of the mind, and the Gods (the Greeks believed in many gods). The book concludes with an epilogue listing the specific writings of Aristotle that Adler drew upon for his book so that interested readers can consult those works directly. This is given in the section below.

== Part I: Aristotle's Universe of Discourse: His Categories and his Taxonomy [Man the Philosophical Animal] ==
Adler explains that according to Aristotle human beings are distinguished from all other animals by having the ability to ask philosophical questions. Adler also explains how Aristotle excelled at classification, and that identifying distinctive features of phenomena (what makes something uniquely itself and not something else) was a key characteristic of Aristotle's thought.

=== 1. Aristotle's Fourfold Classification of Sensible, Material Substances: Inorganic Bodies, Plants, Animals, Men. [Philosophical Games] ===
- Metaphysics I.1
- On the Soul I.1 I.5; II.1-3,5,9; III.3,12
- History of Animals VIII.1 X.1
- Generation of Animals I.1-9 IV.4-6
- Parts of Animals I.4-5

The difference between essence and accident.

- Categories V
- Metaphysics V.4,11; IX.8

=== 3. Productive, Practical, and Theoretic Reason or Mind [Man's Three Dimensions] ===
Aristotle's classification of three activities of a human being: making, doing, and knowing, corresponding to the three types of reason: productive, practical, and theoretical. Adler titles these sections "Man the Maker", "Man the Doer", and "Man the Knower", respectively.

Ethics VI.2-4

On the Soul, III.7

== Part II: Aristotle's philosophy of Nature and of Art. [Man the Maker] ==
In response to the errors and partial truths of:

- Parmenides and his disciple Zeno
- Heraclitus and his disciple Cratylus

Aristotle developed his theory of change. It involves distinction between rest and movement. In local motion, there is a distinction between natural movement and violent movement. There is also change in quality, such as when a green tomato ripens and becomes red. This type of change can be either natural or artificial, for example a green chair can be painted red. There can be a change in quantity. There can also be generation and corruption - coming to be and passing away. Aristotle takes note of what we now call conservation of matter.

4. Nature as artist and the human artist as imitator of nature

5. Three main modes of accidental change: change of place, change of quality, change of quantity

6. Aristotle's doctrine of the four causes: efficient, material, formal, and final.

Physics, II.3-9

Metaphysics I.3-10, V.3, VI.2-3, VII.17, VIII.2-4, IX.8, XII.4-5

7. Further developments in the theory of Potentiality and Actuality, and Matter and Form, especially with respect to substantial change, or Generation and Corruption. [To Be or Not to Be]

8. Aristotle's analysis of the intellectual factors in artistic production and his classification of the arts [Productive ideas and know-how]

== See also ==
- The Conditions of Philosophy
- How to Read a Book
