= Le Roseau d'Or =

French Catholic literary magazine

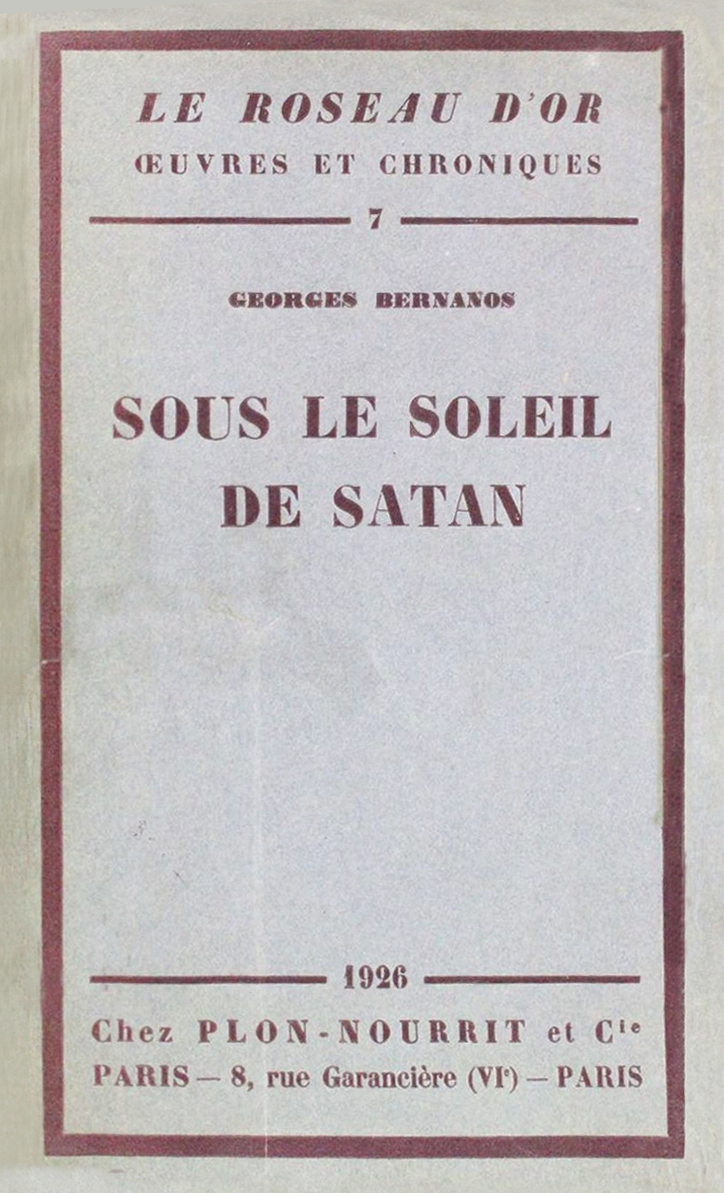
- Under the Sun of Satan by Georges Bernanos
- Editor: Jacques Maritain
- Categories: Literary magazine
- Publisher: Plon
- Founder: Jacques Maritain and Jean Cocteau
- Founded: 1925
- Country: France
- Based in: Paris

Le Roseau d'Or was a literary magazine founded by Jacques Maritain and Jean Cocteau that ran from 1925 to 1932. The editors of L'Intransigeant described it as "an audacious alliance of the philosophy of Saint Thomas and of all kinds of avant-garde literature". The magazine served as a means for Jacques Maritain to develop an international network of collaborators.

== History ==
Jacques Maritain and Jean Cocteau first met in 1924, while Cocteau was grieving the death of his partner Raymond Radiguet. Under the influence of Jacques Maritain, Cocteau sought treatment for his opium addiction and reverted to Roman Catholicism. Maritain and Cocteau, leaders of Catholic and avant-garde literary movements respectively, then became artistic collaborators. They formed a directorial board with Henri Massis and Frédéric Lefèvre with Stanislas Fumet as secretary. Jacques Maritain desired for Le Roseau d'Or to be a vehicle for the promotion of Thomism to the intellectual elite of France, competing with the Nouvelle Revue Française founded by André Gide.

The magazine published poetry, philosophy, and novels. Maritain explicitly intended for Le Roseau d'Or not to be a "confessional" magazine and published Christian, Jewish, and atheist writers. The name Le Roseau d'Or, "The Golden Reed", was taken from the Book of Revelation.

Le Roseau d'Or was notable as a venue for LGBT Roman Catholic writers, including Julien Green, Max Jacob, and Louis Massignon, in addition to Jean Cocteau himself. It also extensively published the work of Russian authors resident in France. Other notable contributors included Henri Ghéon, Charles Ferdinand Ramuz, G. K. Chesterton, Paul Claudel, Georges Bernanos, Nikolai Berdyaev, François Mauriac, Emmanuel Mounier, Romano Guardini, Graham Greene, Giovanni Papini, T.S. Eliot, Daisy Ashford, and Rainer Maria Rilke.
