= The Conditions of Philosophy =

1965 book by Mortimer Adler

- Title page for The Conditions of Philosophy: Its Checkered Past, Its Present Disorder, and Its Future Promise (1965)
- Author: Mortimer Adler
- Publication date: 1965

The Conditions of Philosophy: Its Checkered Past, Its Present Disorder, and Its Future Promise is a 1965 book by the philosopher Mortimer Adler. The book is a reflexive account of philosophy's current status, and its future promise. Its main thesis is that philosophy can recover from its present state by meeting six conditions. Then he tackles related problems of methodology, the "Is-Ought" test, the "Mixed Question" test, as well as including incidental examinations of Popper, Heisenberg, James, etc., and reserving three chapters for the glories and fallacies of Ancient, Medieval and post-Cartesian philosophy.

Adler recapitulated the main insights of this book in his later 1993 book, The Four Dimensions of Philosophy. He explains that in The Conditions of Philosophy, he emphasized two dimensions of philosophy, which provide theoretical and practical knowledge. He added two new dimensions to these two, the understanding of ideas as objects of thought, and the understanding of the different disciplines of intellectual work (Adler 1993, xxvii).

== Summary ==
Here is a summary of the six conditions (page 79-80)

"I have stipulated:

(i) that philosophy should be an autonomous branch of knowledge, in the form of testable, falsifiable doxa;
(ii) that philosophical theories or conclusions should be capable of being judged by a standard of truth, to which appeal can be made in adjudicating disagreements;
(iii) that philosophical inquiry should be conducted as a public enterprise;
(iv) that it should have questions of its own (on which its autonomy is based);
(v) that, among these, some should be first-order questions (about that which is and happens or about what men should do and seek); and
(vi) that none should be esoteric (out of touch with the world and the beliefs of ordinary men)."

== See also ==
- Metaphilosophy
- Aristotle for Everybody, a 1978 work by Adler
- How to Read a Book

== Bibliography ==
Adler, Mortimer J. 1993. The Four Dimensions of Philosophy. Macmillan USA.
