= Éveline Garnier =

Librarian and French Resistance fighter

- Born: Éveline Geneviève Anna Garnier; May 6, 1904
- Died: October 22, 1989 (aged 85)
- Occupation: Librarian
- Known for: French Resistance
- Partner: Andrée Jacob

Éveline Geneviève Anna Garnier (6 May 1904 - 22 October 1989) was a significant figure in the Noyautage des administrations publiques, which aimed at infiltrating the French collaborationalist Vichy Government during the Second World War. She used her job as a librarian as cover for her work in the French Resistance alongside her partner Andrée Jacob, Henri Frenay and Claude Bourdet.

== Early life and family ==
Éveline Geneviève Anna Garnier was born on 6 May 1904 in the 16th arrondissement of Paris. Her mother was Jeanne Julie Gabrielle (née Maritain) (1875-1955) and her father was Charles Marie Georges Garnier (1869-1956), professor of English literature and language at the Lycée Janson-de-Sailly, Inspector General of Public Education and a writer. Her maternal grandmother, Geneviève Maritain (née Favre) (1855-1943), was a feminist and pacifist, the daughter of philosopher and educator Julie Favre and statesman and lawyer Jules Favre. Her maternal uncle was the philosopher Jacques Maritain, who converted from Protestantism to Catholicism in 1906 and later designated her as his principal legatee.

Her parents, both Protestants, divorced shortly before the First World War.

Éveline Garnier was the partner of another member of the French Resistance, Andrée Jacob, whom she met in the Christian circles around her uncle Jacques Maritain.

== Resistance work in the Second World War ==
Garnier was active in the French Resistance during the Second World War. Her codename was Anne.

She worked in close collaboration with Claude Bourdet within the Combat movement, working across intelligence, recruitment, organisation, and direct action. She also worked with Father Foussard, within the Comet Line, which rescued and repatriated Allied airmen that were shot down on French soil.

Garnier became deputy secretary general of the Noyautage des administrations publiques (NAP) network in September 1943, working with her partner Andrée Jacob, (code name Danielle). From March 1944 Garnier was head of the NAP network. She also helped to save Jews by making false papers for them.

After the Liberation of France, she and Andrée Jacob joined the ministère des Anciens combattants de la Résistance et des Déportés (Ministry of Veterans of the Resistance and Deportees).

== Personal life ==
Garnier and Andrée Jacob were in a relationship for over fifty years.

Éveline Garnier died on 22 October 1989 as a result of a cardiovascular disease at the Sainte-Périne hospital in the 16th arrondissement of Paris.

== Commendations ==
- Médaille de la Résistance française (1945)
- Croix de guerre 1939-1945 avec palme (1946)
- Chevalière de la Légion d'honneur (1946)

Plaque Allée Éveline Garnier - Paris

== Commemoration ==
On the occasion of the 75th anniversary of the Liberation of Paris, the Allee Éveline-Garnier and the Allee Andrée-Jacob were inaugurated in the 2nd arrondissement of Paris on 29 August 2019.

== Publications ==
- Éveline Garnier, «Contraste de New York ou ce que M. Herriot n'aura pas vu», Esprit: revue internationale, Paris, 1933
- Éveline Garnier, «Souvenirs sur mon oncle», Cahiers Jacques Maritain, Paris, vol. 2
