= The Range of Reason =

1952 book by Jacques Maritain

- First edition
- Author: Jacques Maritain
- Language: English
- Genre: Essay collection
- Publisher: Scribner
- Publication date: 1952

The Range of Reason is a 1952 book of essays by the Catholic philosopher Jacques Maritain. The text presents a Thomist philosophy regarding religion and morality. It contains a study of Atheism, titled "The Meaning of Contemporary Atheism", which has had a considerable impact on Catholic views of Atheism.

== Essays ==
=== On Human Knowledge ===
In this essay, Maritain considers empiricist epistemology. While he acknowledges that sense-data plays an important part in human knowledge of the world, he rejects the thesis that the real does not exist or cannot be known, because he believes that the intellect can transcend sensory experience to perceive the noumenal world.

=== On Artistic Judgement ===
Maritain here supports the theory that the aesthetic carries a "hidden truth", as an expression of the fundamental individuality of the artist.

=== The Meaning of Contemporary Atheism ===
Maritain introduces various terms to distinguish the beliefs of atheists. These terms are:

- Absolute atheist - one who denies the existence of the god in whom believers actually believe
- Negative atheist - one who rejects the idea of God
- Positive atheist - one who challenges all aspects of God and is an antitheist
- Practical atheist - one who claims belief in God, yet whose actions contradict this claim
- Pseudo-atheist - one who claims atheism, but unconsciously believes in God
- Real atheist - one who denies the existence of God and follows a pseudo-morality rather than Divine law

==== Absolute atheist ====
The absolute atheist does not lack belief in God, but rather constantly challenges and fights against God. Those described as such never stop thinking about God in order to liberate themselves from anything that connotes God.

==== Practical atheist ====
Practical atheists prefer to be seen as adherents to religious faith for selfish reasons, yet deny the gospels by lacking concern for the well-being of others.

==== Pseudo-atheist ====
The pseudo-atheist believes that he or she is an atheist, but unconsciously believes in God. According to Maritain, the "God" whose existence is denied is not God, but rather a being of reason, a nonexistent entity which he or she has mistakenly labeled as God. Thus, the pseudo atheist actually denies an entity that is self-evidently nonexistent or that necessitates negative consequences for nature or humanity.

==== Real atheist ====
The real atheist denies the "God Who is the authentic object of reason and of faith and Whose authentic idea [the atheist's] mind misuses." Maritain states the morality of the real atheist is but a false idol of the "separate Good," which is God's morality.
