= Andrée Jacob =

French resistance fighter (1906–2002)

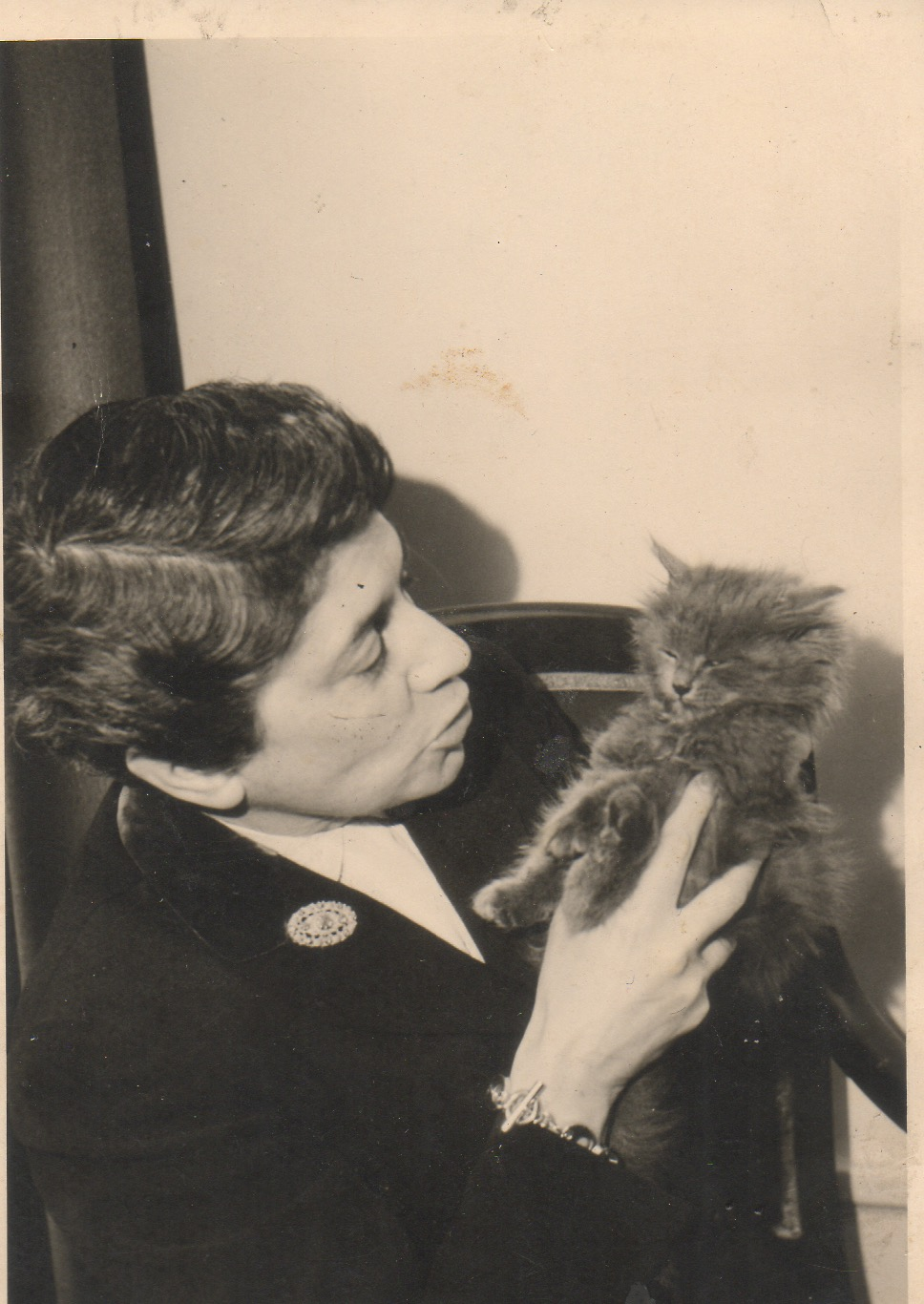
- Andrée Jacob and Gaza the cat 1956
- Born: 22 July 1906
- Died: 6 February 2002 (aged 95)
- Resting place: Montparnasse Cemetery
- Known for: Journalist, Member of the French Resistance
- Partner: Eveline Garnier

Andrée Jacob (22 July 1906 - 6 February 2002) was a member of the French Resistance during the Second World War. Initially working in publishing, she played an active part in the French Resistance during the Second World War. Post war she became a journalist for the newspaper Le Monde, and worked to preserve Parisian cultural heritage. She was the partner of fellow Resistance member Éveline Garnier and the cousin of the artist Max Jacob.

== Early life ==
Andrée Madeleine Jacob was born on 22 July 1906 in the 3rd arrondissement of Paris into a family of shopkeepers who had converted from Judaism to Catholicism in the previous generation. Her cousin was the artist Max Jacob, who later converted to Catholicism.

She met her life partner, Éveline Garnier, through the Catholic circles which revolved around the philosopher Jacques Maritain, who was Garnier's uncle. Jacob worked as a civil servant at the Palais de Chaillot Museum.

== Second World War ==
Following the Fall of France in the Second World War, Jacobs lived under an assumed name, Marie-Thérèse Bourdon, to avoid having to wear the yellow star and the anti-semitic persecution, deportation and murder which people with Jewish ancestry suffered under the Vichy Regime. Members of her extended family were arrested, imprisoned and deported to concentration camps. Her cousins Gaston and Myrthe-Lea Jacob were arrested in January 1944, and deported to Auschwitz concentration camp and their brother Max Jacob died in Drancy internment camp in March 1944. Jacob managed to smuggle her parents out of Paris into the Free French zone, where they were able to live in the home of Éveline Garnier's family.

Jacob helped to save Jews from The Holocaust in France and was very active in the NAP (Noyautage des administrations publiques) network, an arm of the French Resistance which aimed to infiltrate the Vichy Government. NAP was based at the Palais de Chaillot, where she worked and Jacob played an active role in its undertakings. Of the 14 people in the original NAP network, only four escaped the Gestapo, Andrée Jacob (codename Danielle) and Éveline Garnier (codename Anne) were among them.

Jacob's most publicised and best known resistance act during the war was during the liberation of the Bibliothèque nationale de France at the end of August 1944 during the Liberation of Paris, where she arrested the Vichy director Bernard Faÿ at the head of a French Forces of the Interior platoon and saved the library's archives. Faÿ was later sentenced to Dégradation nationale.

== Post war ==
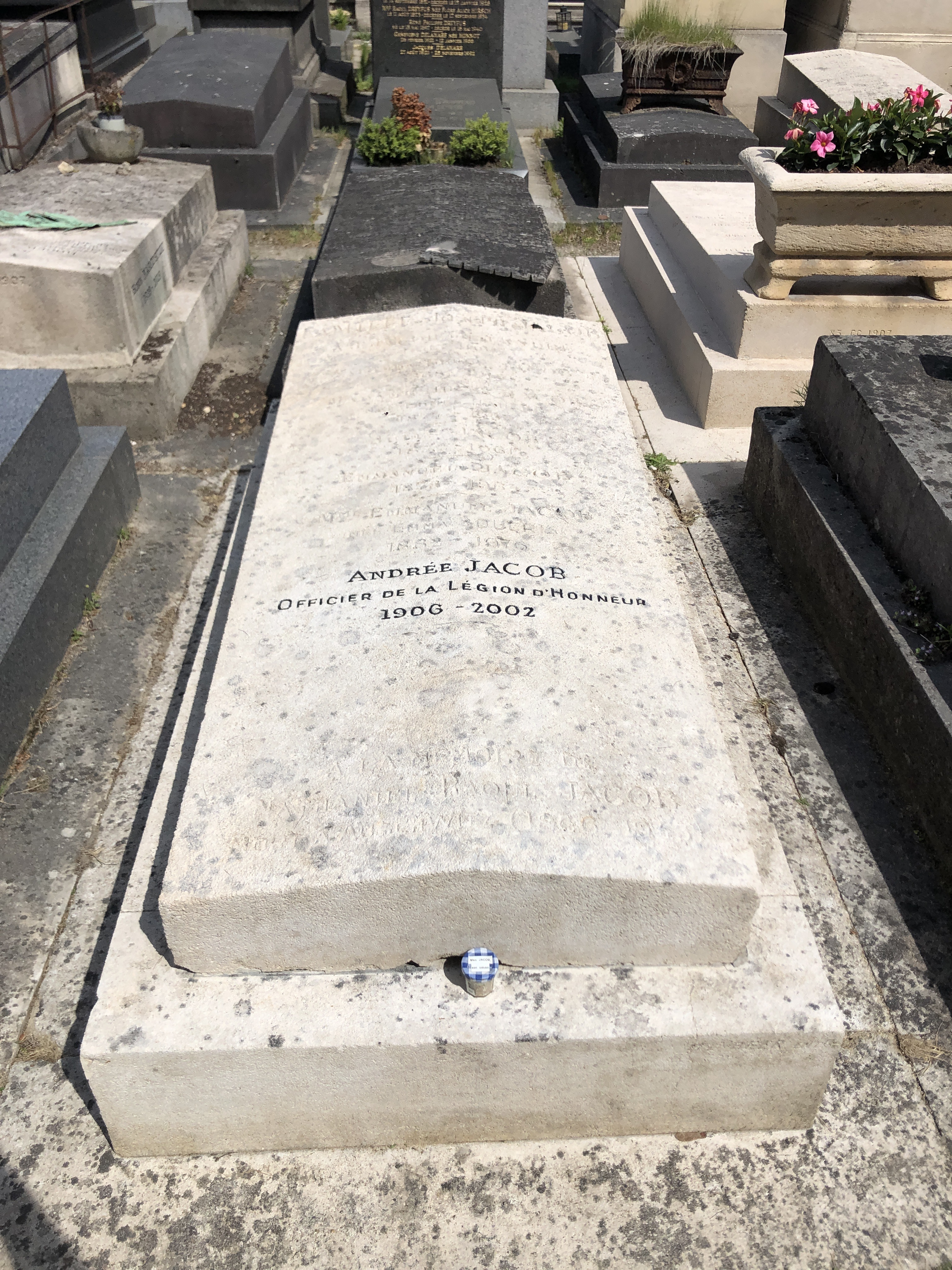
Andrée Jacob's grave in 2022.

Andrée Jacob became head of the archives department at the ministère des Anciens combattants (Ministry of Veterans' Affairs). In 1963 she was elected deputy mayor of the 2nd arrondissement of Paris. From 1965 to 1985, she worked as a journalist for the newspaper Le Monde, where she wrote a column Chronique sur le vieux Paris about the history of Paris in the past and Parisian urban planning.

She joined the Société historique du VIe arrondissement in 1974, and was a director of the Society from 1978 to 2002. In 1986, Jacob became a member of the Commission du vieux Paris, a municipal organisation with a mission to consult on and support the protection of heritage within urban planning policies of the city of Paris. She wrote several books on the capital's heritage before 1991.

Andrée Jacob died on 6 February 2002 in the 7th arrondissement of Paris. She was buried in the Montparnasse Cemetery, in grave no. 97 CC 1907 (24th division - 5th row from the north - 20th row from the east). Her grave was restored in spring 2022.

== Honours ==
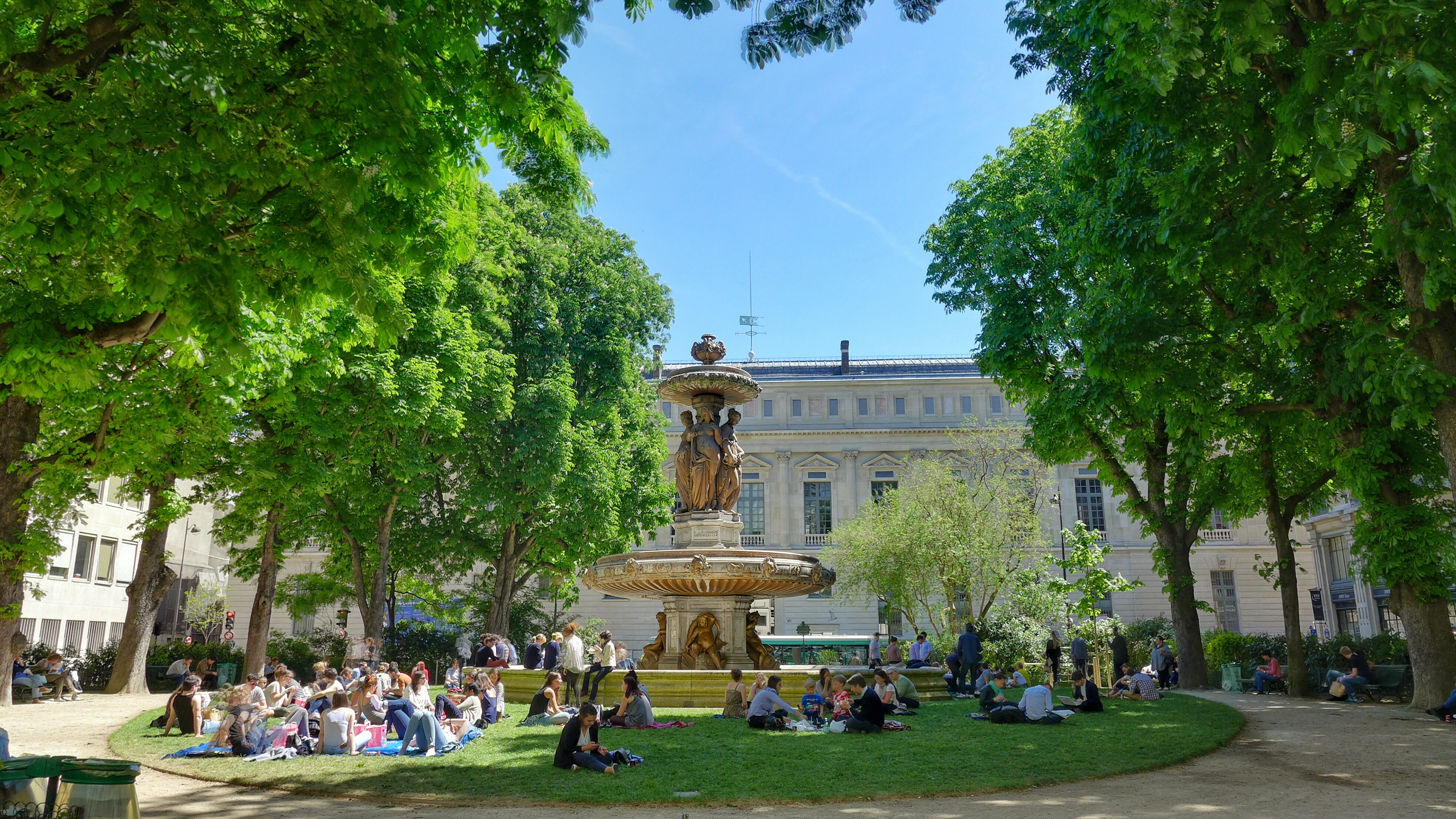
Square Louvois Paris, 'allée Andrée-Jacob is on the left and l'allée Éveline-Garnier on right

- Médaille de la Résistance française (1945)
- Croix de guerre 1939-1945 (1945)
- Chevalier de la Légion d'honneur (1946)
- Officier de la Légion d'honneur (1965)
- Officier de l'instruction publique
- Officier de l'ordre du Mérite du Bénin
- Chevalier des Arts et Lettres

== Publications ==
- Catalogue de l'exposition "La Presse à Paris: 1851-1981" Paris, BHVP, (1983)
- Guide de l'exposition "Paris vécu, Paris rêvé": victor Hugo 1885-1985" Paris, (1985)
- Vie et histoire du VIe arrondissement Paris, Hervas, (1986)
- Vie et histoire du VIIIe arrondissement (1987).
- Vie et histoire du IIe Arrondissement (1988).
- Il y a un siècle, quand les dames tenaient salon Paris, A. Seydoux, 1991]

== Commemoration ==
On 29 August 2019, the 75th anniversary of the Liberation of Paris, two tree lined avenue, l'allée Andrée-Jacob and l'allée Éveline-Garnier were inaugurated in the 2nd arrondissement of Paris in memory of Jacob and Garnier and their relationship of over half a century.
