= The Person and the Common Good =

1947 book by Jacques Maritain

- Cover of the first edition
- Author: Jacques Maritain
- Original title: La personne et le bien commun
- Translator: John J. Fitzgerald
- Language: French
- Subject: Social philosophy
- Published: 1947
- Publication place: France
- Media type: Print
- ISBN: 978-0268002046

The Person and the Common Good (French: La personne et le bien commun) is a 1947 book about social philosophy by the French philosopher and theologian Jacques Maritain.

== Summary ==
In The Person and the Common Good, Maritain discusses "the distinction between individuality and personality." He explores the definition of a man as a physical, singular person, and, conversely, as a contributor to the common good within his society. To aid his explanation, he follows and dissects the philosophies of St. Thomas (Thomism), whose theories on personalism highlight the metaphysical difference between individuality and personality.

== Reception ==
According to the philosopher John Haldane, The Person and the Common Good is Maritain's major contribution to social philosophy.
