= Max Jacob =

French writer and painter (1876–1944)

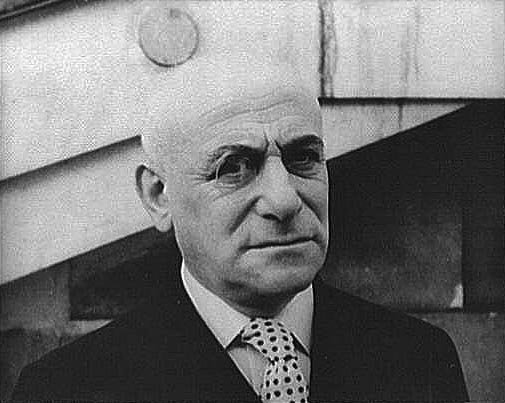
- Jacob in 1934
- Born: 12 July 1876; Quimper, Finistère, Brittany, France
- Died: 5 March 1944 (aged 67); Drancy internment camp, France
- Writing career
- Pen name: Léon David; Morven le Gaëlique
- Movement: School of Paris

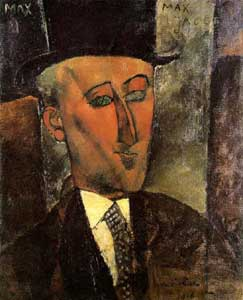
Max Jacob, by Modigliani, 1916

Max Jacob (French: [maks ʒakɔb]; 12 July 1876 – 5 March 1944) was a French poet, painter, writer, and critic.

Pablo Picasso, 1921, Three Musicians, oil on canvas, 200.7 × 222.9 cm, Museum of Modern Art, New York. Acquired through the Lillie P. Bliss Bequest; the figure on the right (holding the sheet music) represents Max Jacob.

== Life and career ==
After spending his childhood in Quimper, Brittany, he enrolled in the Paris Colonial School, which he left in 1897 for an artistic career. He was one of the first friends Pablo Picasso made in Paris. They met in the summer of 1901, and it was Jacob who helped the young artist learn French. Later, on the Boulevard Voltaire, he shared a room with Picasso, who remained a lifelong friend (and was represented as the monk in his painting Three Musicians, which Picasso painted in 1921). Jacob introduced him to Guillaume Apollinaire, who in turn introduced Picasso to Georges Braque. He would become close friends with Jean Cocteau, Jean Hugo, Christopher Wood and Amedeo Modigliani, who painted his portrait in 1916. He also befriended and encouraged the artist Romanin, otherwise known as French politician, and future Resistance leader Jean Moulin. Moulin's famous nom de guerre Max is presumed to be selected in honor of Jacob.

Jacob, who was Jewish, claimed to have had a vision of Christ in 1909, and converted to Catholicism. He was hopeful that this conversion would alleviate his homosexual tendencies.

Max Jacob is regarded as an important link between the symbolists and the surrealists, as can be seen in his prose poems Le cornet à dés (The Dice Box, 1917 – the 1948 Gallimard edition was illustrated by Jean Hugo) and in his paintings, exhibitions of which were held in New York City in 1930 and 1938.

His writings include the novel Saint Matorel (1911), the free verses Le laboratoire central (1921), and La défense de Tartuffe (1919), which expounds his philosophical and religious attitudes.

The famous psychoanalyst Jacques Lacan attributed the quote "The truth is always new" to Jacob.

Liane de Pougy (1869–1950)'s diaries from 1919 to 1941, published as Mes cahiers bleus in French in 1977, and My Blue Notebooks in English in 1979, describe Jacob.

== Death ==
Having moved outside Paris in May 1936, to settle in Saint-Benoît-sur-Loire, Loiret, Max Jacob was arrested on 24 February 1944 by the Gestapo, and interned at Orléans prison (prisoner #15872). Jewish by birth, Jacob's brother Gaston had been previously arrested in January 1944, and deported to the concentration camp Auschwitz along with their sister Myrthe-Lea; her husband was also deported by the Nazis at this time. A cousin, Andrée Jacob, survived by living under an assumed name and worked in the Resistance movement Noyautage des administrations publiques. Following his incarceration at Orléans, Max was then transferred to Drancy internment camp from where he was to be transported in the next convoy to Auschwitz. However, said to be suffering from bronchial pneumonia, Max Jacob died on 5 March in the infirmary of La Cité de la Muette, a former housing block which served as the internment camp known as Drancy.

First interred in Ivry after the war ended, his remains were transferred in 1949 by his artist friends Jean Cassou and René Iché (who sculpted the tomb of the poet) to the cemetery at Saint-Benoît-sur-Loire in the Loiret département.

== Pseudonyms ==
As well as his nom d'état civil, or regular name, Jacob worked under at least two pseudonyms, Léon David and Morven le Gaëlique.

== In popular culture ==
German actor Udo Kier plays Jacob in the 2004 film Modigliani. In the 2006 film Monsieur Max, which deals with the life of Jacob from the First World War until his death, he was played by Jean-Claude Brialy; this was Brialy's last film. In the 2013 Spanish film La banda Picasso, Jacob is played by Lionel Abelanski. T. R. Knight portrays Jacob in the 2018 season of the television series Genius, which focuses on the life and career of Pablo Picasso.

== Gallery ==
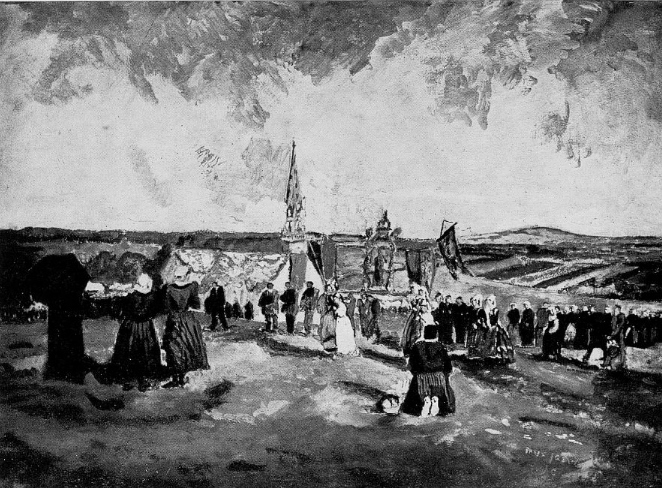
Le pardon de Sainte-Anne

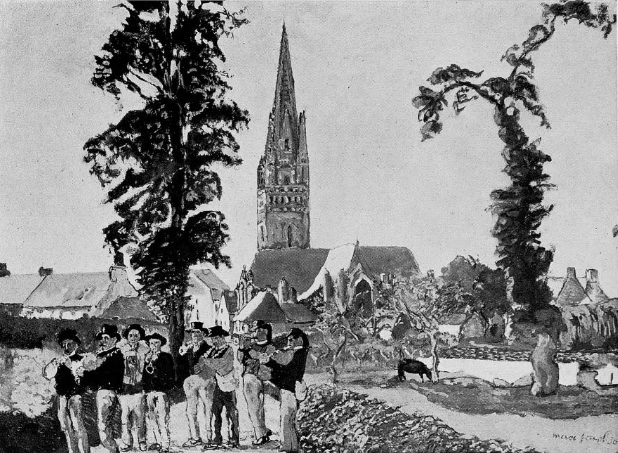
Le clocher de Ploaré

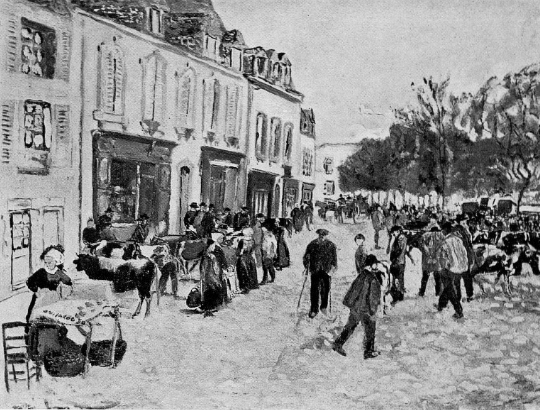
Le marché à Pont-l'Abbé

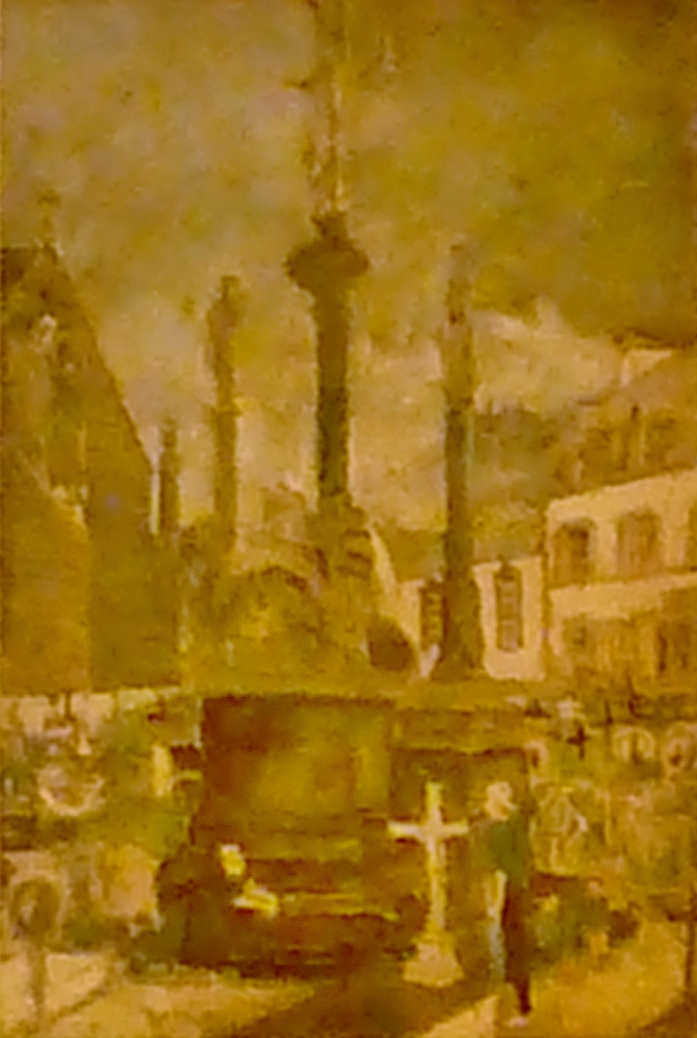
Le calvaire de Guengat

== See also ==
- Lionel Floch
- Furniture music: Erik Satie's second set of furniture music was composed and performed in 1920 as Entr'acte music for one of Jacob's comedies (Ruffian toujours, truand jamais – text of this play is lost)
- The Selected Poems of Max Jacob, trans. William Kulik (Oberlin College Press, 1999), ISBN 0-932440-86-X
- Monsieur Max (2007), French TV movie starring Jean-Claude Brialy as Jacob, in Brialy's last film role
