= FIGHT (Rochester, New York) =

Civil rights group

FIGHT was a civil rights and community organizing group founded in Rochester, New York, in the aftermath of the 1964 Rochester race riot. Led by Franklin Florence and organized with assistance from Saul Alinsky and the Industrial Areas Foundation, the group became one of the most prominent Black-led organizations in Rochester during the mid-1960s. Its name stood for Freedom, Integration, God, Honor, Today, though “Integration” was later sometimes rendered as “Independence” as the organization's approach evolved.

FIGHT emerged from mounting frustration over racial inequality in Rochester, especially in employment, housing, and policing. The 1964 uprising forced broader public attention onto long-standing grievances within the city's Black community. In the years that followed, Rochester activists and clergy sought new forms of organized political and economic pressure, and FIGHT became one of the best-known vehicles for that effort.

The organization became especially known for its campaign against discriminatory hiring practices at Eastman Kodak, then Rochester's dominant employer. FIGHT argued that Black Rochesterians were largely excluded from the company's better jobs and opportunities for advancement. Under Florence's leadership, the group used public protest, direct pressure, and shareholder activism to challenge Kodak and force negotiations. The campaign became nationally notable as an example of northern civil rights activism focused not only on formal segregation, but also on economic power and access to employment.

In 1967, FIGHT reached an agreement with Kodak that included a job-training and hiring program for African American workers. The organization also helped inspire or support related efforts aimed at Black economic development in Rochester, including the creation of a Black-owned manufacturing venture later known as Eltrex Industries. These efforts reflected FIGHT's broader emphasis on combining protest with institution-building and economic self-determination.
