= 1964 Rochester race riot =

Race riot in New York

- Part of Ghetto riots
- Date: July 24–26, 1964; 62 years ago
- Location: Rochester, New York, United States
- Caused by: Police brutality against African Americans

Parties
Black rioters	Rochester Police Department; New York National Guard

Casualties
- Deaths: 5 (4 from helicopter crash)
- Injuries: 350
- Arrested: 976

The 1964 Rochester race riot was a riot that occurred in 1964 in Rochester, New York, United States. The riot occurred in the context of a rapidly-growing African American population in Rochester which had experienced discrimination in employment, housing, and policing in the preceding years. Violence began when the Rochester Police Department attempted to make an arrest at a block party on July 24, 1964. The riot lasted until July 26 and resulted in five deaths, four of which occurred in a helicopter crash in the city, as well as over 300 injuries and 900 arrests. In the aftermath of the riot, downtown Rochester received the attention of several new urban renewal and public housing projects, and local activists organized campaigns to change hiring practices in the city.

== Background ==
The African American population of Rochester grew during the 1950s and 1960s, increasing from 7,845 in 1950 to more than 32,000 in 1964, at the time of the riot. Much of that population growth came from the South, travelling north in hopes of better socioeconomic conditions. Black migrants were instead met with segregated schools, dilapidated housing, and an unemployment rate that was more than six times higher than the unemployment rate for whites. Black residents suffered from constant public harassment and humiliation, often being referred to as "bean pickers" in a reference to black migrant workers in the area, as well as being denied housing throughout the city, with African Americans being funneled into the run-down Upper Falls neighborhood. The Rochester race riot came at a time of heightened racial tensions and violence in the United States, occurring only a week after a major race riot in Harlem.

== Riot ==
At 10:00 p.m. on July 24, 1964, the Rochester Police Department (RPD) attempted to arrest an intoxicated man at a street block party and dance on Joseph Avenue, in the Upper Falls neighborhood of Rochester. Police found 20-year-old Randy Manigault unruly and disorderly. They determined he was intoxicated and attempted to arrest him. Manigualt became combative and resisted arrest.

Bystanders felt police were too forceful and started throwing bottles and bricks at police. Police then called for backup from the RPD, with a K-9 unit responding due to a shortage of other officers. Despite being against RPD practice to use police dogs on crowds, two police dogs were used to control the crowd. This use of police dogs seems to have played a part in starting the riot, with the presence of K-9 units evoking memories of violent police dogs being used against peaceful civil rights protesters in Birmingham, Alabama.

By 11:30 p.m., all available officers had been deployed and were engaged with around 400 rioters. At 2:00 a.m., Rochester police chief William Lombard ordered officers to use riot weapons on the crowd. The riot had swelled to 2,000 people by 3:30 a.m. and looting had begun on Clinton Avenue, the main thoroughfare in Upper Falls. Governor Rockefeller declared a state of emergency by 9:00 a.m., with the event being officially dubbed a "riot" at that time. The chaos calmed during the day on July 25, 1964, before rioting resumed in force that night.

On July 25 six black organizers, including three clergy members, brought Mayor Lamb a list of demands which, if met, would bring an end to the violence. These included a mayoral committee consisting of members of the black community to oversee the police department, the deputization of "responsible area residents" and more resources allocated to black-owned businesses and workers. Mayor Lamb would not agree to deputize citizens. Meanwhile, violence had spread to other areas of the city by that evening, including Rochester's 3rd and 19th Wards. One man was killed when he arrived on scene wearing a helmet, stood in the street and was subsequently hit and dragged 100 feet by a passing car.

The last day of the ordeal was July 26, when a helicopter used to survey the violence flew too close to a house on Clarissa Street, clipping the roof. The crash resulted in the immediate death of the helicopter pilot and two residents of the house. Col. Robert Abbott, the civil defense director for Monroe County, died from his wounds weeks later as a fourth victim. Later that same day, violence erupted in Rochester's Upper Falls neighborhood when demonstrators threw Molotov cocktails at police, who responded with gunfire.

== Aftermath ==
Peace was restored after three days, after Governor Nelson Rockefeller mobilized the New York National Guard. Between 800 and 1,000 national guardsmen were sent to the city. By the time the disturbance was over, five were dead (four from the helicopter crash) and 350 injured. 976 people were arrested and 204 stores were either looted or damaged.

A police officer, Dominick D'Angelo, suffered a cut under his eye, but was able to remain on duty, and ABC News reporter Dick Baumbach was shot in the face, but it only grazed his facial structure.

Although the riot was initially blamed on "outside agitators," almost all the rioters arrested were from the local area, with only 14 people arrested who resided outside Monroe County. Third Ward Supervisor Constance Mitchell stated, "I know the kids here. I know the hard ones and the good kids. And it was the good kids in my ward who first threw the bricks through the windows. Then the adults stepped in. This community just went insane." This led to a reappraisal of policies and practices which had not changed in face of a growing black population in the previous 10 years.

At that time, most black Rochesterians held low-pay and low-skill jobs and lived in substandard housing. Rochester's public housing authority had only been established in 1955 and its only projects, Hanover Houses and Chatham Gardens, were overflowing with tenants by 1964. In the decade following the riot, the City of Rochester acquired the land blighted by the riot, leveled remaining buildings, and removed or re-positioned many of the streets. Several public housing projects were planned and built during the 1960s and 1970s.

Social service agencies, including Action for a Better Community and the Urban League of Rochester, were established as a result of the riot. In 1965, local activists organized the organization FIGHT (Freedom, Integration, God, Honor, Today) to combat discriminatory hiring practices with the assistance of Saul Alinsky. The organization was led by Franklin Florence and reached an agreement with Eastman Kodak to hire more African American employees in 1967.

== See also ==
- List of incidents of civil unrest in the United States
- List of ethnic riots
