= The Degrees of Knowledge =

1932 book by Jacques Maritain

- Author: Jacques Maritain
- Language: French
- Subject: Epistemology
- Published: 1932 (in French); 1937 (in English, by Geoffrey Bles (London))
- Publication place: France
- Media type: Print (Hardcover and Paperback)
- ISBN: 978-0268008864

The Degrees of Knowledge is a 1932 book by the French philosopher Jacques Maritain, in which the author adopts St. Thomas Aquinas’s view called critical realism and applies it to his own epistemological positions. According to critical realism, what we know is identical with what exists, and to know a thing is for its ‘essence’ to exist immaterially in the mind. In The Degrees of Knowledge, Maritain applies this view as he seeks to explain the nature of knowledge, not only in science and philosophy, but also in religious faith and mysticism. Maritain argues that there are different ‘kinds’ and ‘orders’ of knowledge and, within them, different ‘degrees’ determined by the nature of the thing to be known and the ‘degree of abstraction’ involved. The book is divided into two parts: Part one discusses the degrees of knowledge for science and philosophy – or ‘rational knowledge,’ and part two discusses the degrees of knowledge for religious faith and mysticism – or ‘super-rational knowledge.’

== Summary ==
=== Epistemology ===
Philosophy and Experimental Science

Maritain introduces the experimental stage of knowledge, which he regards as the most rudimentary of the degrees of knowledge. Experimental knowledge is a type of a posteriori knowledge – or knowledge after experience. Experimental knowledge has the capacity to be universalized into a law if what is known is necessarily the case rather than contingently the case.

Our Knowledge of the Sensible World

Maritain discusses the types of knowledge, and he claims that knowledge is only valid when you accept that this reality is true.

Metaphysical Knowledge

Maritain discusses a kind of knowledge whose objects are beyond our sensible experience – that is metaphysical knowledge. The objects of metaphysical knowledge can range from possibilities that are beyond the scope of what we know to be physically true.

Mystical Experience and Philosophy

Maritain discusses the three forms of wisdom where wisdom is defined as “a supreme form of knowledge having a universal object and proceeding from first principles."^{^{[7]}}] The first form he describes is metaphysical knowledge. He claims that the wisest people are those who ‘recognize the existence of God.’ The second form of wisdom he discusses is knowledge by analogy. Finally, the third form of wisdom, Maritain suggests is theology.

Concerning Augustinian Wisdom

Maritain discusses Augustinianism and Thomism. The teachings of Saint Augustinus (Augustine) tell us that the highest form of wisdom is the wisdom of the Holy Spirit. This view is called Augustinianism. The teachings of Saint Thomas – or Thomism – is similar to Augustinianism yet are more universal and technical.

Saint John of the Cross, The Practician of the Contemplative Life

Maritain discusses the difference between communicable and incommunicable Knowledge. Communicable knowledge is knowledge whose objects we have experience of and can be articulated by way of concepts and ideas. Incommunicable knowledge, although it is also gained by way of experience and thus has concrete objects, can not be articulated by way of concepts and ideas, for there are none by which to articulate them by.

=== Metaphysics ===
In The Degrees of Knowledge, Maritain discusses his idea of “critical realism.” Maritain lists and discusses seven points from Thomas Aquinas’ doctrine of the nature of knowledge, for Maritain's critical realism was heavily influenced by Aquinas. First, Maritain states that a being's knowledge is a measure of its immaterialism. Second, Maritain states that to know something is for the knower to be united with what is known more so than the matter is united with the form. Third, Maritain states that knowledge is synonymous with being. He proceeds to say this is why God's knowledge and existence are inseparable. Fourth, Maritain states that knowledge is not an activity. Fifth, Maritain states that the knower and the known are the same thing. Sixth, Maritain discusses the means of the union between the knower and the known. Lastly, Maritain states that a gain in knowledge is a change in being.
