= Franklin Florence =

American civil rights leader (1933–2023)

- Born: August 9, 1933; Miami, Florida, U.S.
- Died: February 1, 2023 (aged 89); Rochester, New York, U.S.
- Education: Pepperdine University
- Known for: Political activism
- Spouse: Mary (Payne) Florence
- Children: 4
- Church: Churches of Christ

Franklin Delano Roosevelt Florence Sr. (August 9, 1933 – February 1, 2023) was an American Christian minister who was heavily involved in civil rights work in Rochester, New York, for five decades. He was most well known as the founder and first president of the civil rights group FIGHT in 1965 after the 1964 Rochester race riot. Prior to his death, he served as the senior pastor at the Central Church of Christ in Rochester, which he founded.

== Early life ==
Florence was born in 1933 to Hozel and Berth Florence. He came under the influence of evangelist Marshall Keeble in his mid-teens. He was educated at Nashville Christian Institute from 1948 to 1952. He later attended Pepperdine University in Los Angeles, dropping out after two years to return home. On his return he was ordained and became pastor of the 18th Street Church of Christ in West Palm Beach. He moved to Rochester in 1959. At the age of 25, Florence was recruited to become the pastor of the Reynolds Street Church of Christ in Rochester, New York, where he moved with his wife and children. He immediately became involved with endeavors aimed to help improve the living conditions of blacks living in the Rochester community.

== Civil rights advocacy ==
=== FIGHT ===
Florence was a founder and the first president of FIGHT (Freedom, Independence, God, Honor, Today). Its first convention in Rochester attracted 1,500 people.

FIGHT was established in 1964, although the organization's first official constitution was not ratified until 1965. Originally the FIGHT acronym stood for Freedom, Integration, God, Honor, Today -- "Integration" was later changed to "Independence" as the group adopted more militant strategies.

The organization focused much of its efforts on discriminatory hiring practices at Rochester's largest employers. In 1967, FIGHT successfully negotiated an agreement with Eastman Kodak to hire 600 African-American workers in a jobs training program. Florence used hardball tactics in his interactions with Kodak, including disrupting a meeting of shareholders and travelling to Kodak's headquarters with a group of supporters and demanding to meet with the company's management. Through an initiative spearheaded by Xerox executive Joseph Wilson, FIGHT also established a black-owned business to compete with the white-dominated corporations, initially called Fighton and later named Eltrex Industries. Eltrex experienced initial success and employed 350 workers at its peak, but struggled to finance expansions and went out of business in 2011. Housing was another priority for FIGHT. Protests were organized to bring awareness to absentee landlords in the city. Two housing developments, the FIGHT Village and FIGHT Square, were also built.

Florence's term as president ended in 1967, and he lost contentious elections in 1969 and 1970. The Rochester Area Ministers Conference, a local group of black ministers, expelled Florence for encouraging “violence and bloodshed" afterwards and removed him from Reynolds Street Church. He started a new congregation at the Central Church of Christ in response, where he and his son Clifford would continue preaching until his death.

=== Later career ===
Florence was an observer during the 1971 Attica Prison riot. On September 12, he delivered a sermon to the protesting inmates, denouncing exploitative social conditions. He was a member of the anti-poverty agency Action for a Better Community and the Rochester Northeast Development Corporation. In 1972, he unsuccessfully ran for the New York State Assembly on the Liberal Party line. He also worked for Jesse Jackson's 1984 presidential campaign.

In his later years, Florence protested against police brutality in Rochester. In a 2018 interview, he stated that little progress had been made in the fight against racism since the start of the civil rights movement.

== Personal life and death ==
Florence died in Rochester on February 1, 2023, aged 89.
