= Miguel Vatter =

Political theorist

- Occupations: Philosopher; Professor of Politics

Education
- Education: The New School for Social Research (PhD)

Philosophical work
- Era: Contemporary philosophy
- Region: Western philosophy
- Institutions: Deakin University
- Language: English; Spanish
- Main interests: biopolitics; political theology; Machiavelli; republicanism
- Notable works: Machiavelli's The Prince: A Reader's Guide; The Republic of the Living: Biopolitics and the Critique of Civil Society; Living Law: Jewish Political Theology from Hermann Cohen to Hannah Arendt

Miguel Vatter is a political theorist and professor whose research spans biopolitics, political theology, the history of republican thought, and the intellectual history of modern political thought. He is a professor of Politics at the Alfred Deakin Institute for Citizenship and Globalisation, Deakin University, and has held appointments in Australia, the United States, and Chile.

== Books ==
- Machiavelli's The Prince: A Reader's Guide (Bloomsbury Academic, 2013).
- The Republic of the Living: Biopolitics and the Critique of Civil Society (Fordham University Press, 2014).
- Living Law: Jewish Political Theology from Hermann Cohen to Hannah Arendt (Oxford University Press, 2021).
- Divine Democracy Political Theology after Carl Schmitt, by Vatter, Miguel E., Published: 2021.
- (editor, with Vanessa Lemm) The Viral Politics of COVID-19: Nature, Home and Planetary Health (Palgrave Macmillan, 2022).
