= Noyautage des administrations publiques =

Noyautage des administrations publiques, also known by the abbreviation NAP, was an arm of the French Resistance, started by André Plaisantin of the Combat movement, with the aim of infiltrating the Vichy Government. It was started in 1942 on a suggestion from Claude Bourdet to Jean Moulin.

The branch of the NAP charged with infiltrating the highest parts of the Vichy administration was called "Super-NAP", and was led by Albert Chambon.

The NAP only started developing effectively after the merging in early 1943 of the main zone libre resistance movements, namely Combat, Libération-Sud and Franc-Tireur, into the Mouvements unis de la Résistance (MUR). It subsequently expanded into the zone occupée. The primary missions of the NAP were the passing of information to Free France, the safety of the French Resistance, "professional" sabotage, provision of false documents, and preparing to take power at the moment when France would be liberated.

Of the 14 people involved in the creation of the NAP network, only four escaped the Gestapo, Éveline Garnie and Andrée Jacob were two of those survivors. Of the c.1,500 approved NAP agents, more than 120 were killed or died following deportation, including Marcel Peck and Jean-Guy Bernard.

== Notable members ==
- Gilbert Sylvain Pannetier worked in the General Directorate of Telecommunications (Postes, Télégraphes et Téléphones (France) created in 1941, arrest, sentenced to deportation and died in Germany.
- Édouard Bonnefoy, prefect of the Rhône, arrested and deported to Neuengamme concentration camp, killed in the Baltic Sea on 3 May 1945, along with 10,000 other prisoners, during the sinking of the SS Cap Arcona, machine-gunned by mistake by the Royal Air Force.
- Jacques-Félix Bussière, prefect of Bouches-du-Rhône, arrested and deported to Neuengamme concentration camp, killed in the Baltic Sea on 3 May 1945, when the SS Cap Arcona was machine-gunned and sunk by mistake by the Royal Air Force.
- Louis Dupiech, prefect of Aveyron, arrested and deported to Neuengamme concentration camp, killed in the Baltic Sea on 3 May 1945, along with 10,000 other prisoners, when the SS Thielbek was machine-gunned and sunk by mistake by the Royal Air Force.
- André Moosmann, at the Ministère du Travail (Ministry of Labour).
- Maurice Dide, arrested and deported to Buchenwald, where he died on 26 March 1944, aged 72.
- Pierre Dumas
- Frédéric Bourguet, politician, member of the MUR board and then president of the Tarn departmental liberation committee
- Élie Vieux, teacher. Member of the NAP network, he became the fourth leader of the Mouvements unis de la Résistance in the Roanne district and president of the Roanne Liberation Committee.
- Éveline Garnier
- Andrée Jacob
- Jean Mairey.
