= Art and Scholasticism =

1920 book by Jacques Maritain

- Author: Jacques Maritain
- Original title: Art et scolastique
- Language: French
- Subject: Aesthetics
- Published: 1920
- Publication place: France
- Media type: Print (Hardcover and Paperback)
- ISBN: 978-1599868479

Art and Scholasticism (French: Art et scolastique) is a 1920 book by the French philosopher Jacques Maritain. It is considered his major contribution to aesthetics. According to Gary Furnell, the work "was a key text that guided the work of writers such as Allen Tate, Caroline Gordon, Sally and Robert Fitzgerald, Francois Mauriac, Thomas Merton, John Howard Griffin, Flannery O’Connor and T.S. Eliot." Maritain's Thomist-Aristotelian distinction between Art and Prudence was highly influential on the sculptor Eric Gill, and were developed further in the seminal essay on theological aesthetics, entitled 'Art and Sacrament', by poet and painter David Jones.
