= History of ACORN in the United States =

Former advocacy group

Association of Community Organizations for Reform Now
- Abbreviation: ACORN
- Formation: 1970
- Type: Non-governmental organization
- Legal status: Active; defunct (US)
- Headquarters: New Orleans, Louisiana, U.S.
- Region served: United States; Peru; Argentina; Mexico; India; Canada; United Kingdom
- CEO: Bertha Lewis (2008–2010)
- Budget: US$25 Million, 10% federal funding

The Association of Community Organizations for Reform Now (ACORN) is an international collection of autonomous community-based organizations that advocated for low- and moderate-income families. The association was founded in 1970 by Wade Rathke and Gary Delgado, and, at its peak in the US, had over 500,000 members and more than 1,200 neighborhood chapters in over 100 cities.

== Organization and budget ==
In the US, ACORN was composed of a number of legally distinct nonprofit entities and affiliates including a nationwide umbrella organization established as a 501(c)(4) that performed lobbying; local chapters established as 501(c)(3) nonpartisan charities; and the national nonprofit and nonstock organization, ACORN Housing Corporation. ACORN's priorities included: better housing and wages for the poor, more community development investment from banks and governments, better public schools, labor-oriented causes and social justice issues. ACORN pursued these goals through demonstration, negotiation, lobbying for legislation, and voter participation.

Until the controversies of 2008 and 2009, in the US ACORN had an annual budget of approximately US$25 million, with approximately 10% of those funds coming from federal sources, a smaller figure from state sources, and the rest coming from supporters and membership. HUD estimated that ACORN received $42 million in federal funds since the 2000 budget year; the House Oversight and Government Reform Committee estimated that ACORN received $53 million since 1994.

== History ==
=== 1970–1975 ===
ACORN was founded in 1970 by Wade Rathke, Gary Delgado, and George Wiley as a grassroots organization advocating for low- and moderate-income families. Rathke, who had previously dropped out of Williams College to promote draft resistance for Students for a Democratic Society, sought to mobilize working-class and marginalized communities into a political force.

ACORN’s early efforts focused on welfare rights activism in Arkansas, inspired by a clause in the state's welfare laws that allowed recipients to obtain necessary items such as clothing and furniture. This campaign laid the foundation for the Arkansas Community Organizations for Reform Now, which later expanded into the national ACORN network.

The organization aimed to unite welfare recipients and low-income workers around shared economic and social issues, including school lunches, unemployment benefits, Vietnam veterans' rights, and access to emergency medical care. ACORN’s model combined direct action, community organizing, and policy advocacy, which were strategies that would feature in the organization's activism in subsequent decades.

=== 1975–1980 ===
In 1975, ACORN expanded into Texas and South Dakota. Later that year, on December 13, sixty leaders from the three ACORN states elected the organization’s first associate Executive Board and its first president, Steve McDonald, to oversee national matters.

Over the next five years, ACORN continued its expansion, establishing chapters in at least three new states annually, reaching 20 states by the end of the decade. As its influence grew, ACORN launched its first multi-state campaign. In 1978, the organization held a national convention in Memphis, drawing 1,000 members. At the convention’s conclusion, ACORN delegates marched to the Democratic Party Conference, where they introduced a nine-point "People’s Platform." The platform was officially ratified in 1979, forming the foundation of ACORN’s platform

During the 1980 presidential election, ACORN actively promoted its People’s Platform. ACORN organized demonstrations targeting both major party candidates, demanded a meeting with President Jimmy Carter, and staged a protest outside the home of his campaign finance chair. The organization also presented its proposals to the Republican Party platform committee.

=== 1981–1994 ===
During the 1980s and early 1990s, ACORN expanded its operations while increasing its involvement in political activism and housing rights campaigns. By 1984, ACORN had chapters in New York City, Washington, D.C., and Chicago, reaching a total of 27 states. It continued advocating for low-income communities by engaging in national elections, lobbying for legislative reforms, and expanding its grassroots organizing efforts.

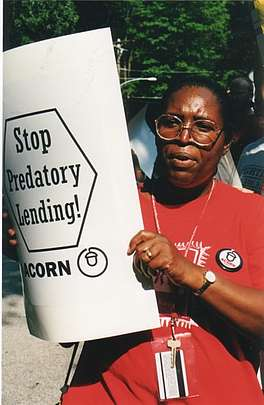
ACORN member demonstrating against predatory lending

==== Growth and Expansion ====
In 1982, ACORN established its first legislative office in Washington, D.C. to strengthen its lobbying efforts. By the 1984 United States presidential election, ACORN sought to endorse a candidate but did not reach the required 75% internal polling threshold, though there was strong support for Jesse Jackson. The organization also pushed for local election reforms in cities like Pittsburgh, Columbia, and Sioux Falls, advocating for single-member district voting to improve minority and low-income representation.

By 1988, ACORN had over 70,000 members in 28 states. It played a role in national politics, hosting its National Convention in Atlanta alongside the 1988 Democratic National Convention. In the early 1990s, it focused on banking reforms, tenant rights, and voter access.

==== Political and Housing Campaigns ====
ACORN launched a series of major protests throughout this period. In 1982, it organized the "Reagan Ranches" protest, setting up tent cities in Washington, D.C. and 35 other cities to criticize the administration’s social spending cuts. ACORN members later marched on the White House and testified before Congress regarding housing affordability.

In 1990, ACORN intensified its focus on housing rights, pressuring banks to comply with the Community Reinvestment Act (CRA). At its 1990 National Convention in Chicago, members staged a squatting demonstration at a Resolution Trust Corporation (RTC) property to protest bank foreclosure policies. ACORN also staged a two-day takeover of the House Banking Committee hearing room in 1991 to fight against CRA rollbacks.

In 1992, ACORN hosted the ACORN-Bank Summit in New York City, pressuring banks to increase lending to low-income neighborhoods. Protests at Citibank’s headquarters led to negotiations on lending practices. In 1993, ACORN launched a national campaign against redlining, targeting companies like Allstate, which later agreed to a $10 million partnership with ACORN and NationsBank to expand homeownership opportunities.

ACORN also played a key role in the passage of the National Voter Registration Act of 1993 ("Motor Voter Act"), which expanded voter registration at motor vehicle bureaus. Following the law’s enactment, ACORN pursued lawsuits in Illinois, Louisiana, and Pennsylvania to enforce its provisions.

By 1994, ACORN’s activism had positioned it as a major force in housing, electoral reform, and economic justice efforts, paving the way for its later focus on living wage campaigns and broader labor rights advocacy.

=== 1995–2007: Expansion, Living Wage Campaigns, and Political Influence ===
From 1995 to 2007, ACORN expanded its advocacy beyond housing rights, focusing on Living wage laws, Voter registration, Banking reform, and labor rights. It became a powerful grassroots force, engaging in national politics, corporate accountability campaigns, and election-related efforts.

==== Living Wage and Workers' Rights Campaigns ====
In the late 1990s, ACORN lead early examples of living wage campaigns, successfully pushing for minimum wage increases in over 15 cities. This effort culminated in the 1996 California Proposition 210 ballot initiative, which raised the state’s minimum wage. The organization was instrumental in creating the Working Families Party in New York in 1998, using fusion voting to elect progressive candidates. This work would continue into the early 2000s as ACORN intensified efforts to improve labor conditions for low-wage workers, advocating for paid sick leave, unionization, and wage theft protections.

==== Voter Registration and Election Reform ====
ACORN played a major role in Voter registration drives, registering over 1.5 million low-income voters from 2000 to 2006. It lobbied for electoral reforms, including Early voting, Same-day registration, and mail-in ballots. However, its voter registration efforts became politically contentious, with Republicans accusing ACORN of fraudulent registrations, despite no evidence of widespread voter fraud.

During the 2004 U.S. presidential election, ACORN ran Project Vote, targeting historically disenfranchised communities. The George W. Bush administration later investigated ACORN’s voter registration practices, but did not find substantial wrongdoing.

==== Banking Reform and Anti-Predatory Lending Efforts ====
Following its success in pressuring Citibank in the early 1990s, ACORN expanded its campaign against predatory lending, targeting major financial institutions. By the early 2000s, it secured agreements with major banks to increase lending transparency and reduce discriminatory lending practices. In 2002, ACORN negotiated a settlement with Household International (now part of HSBC), resulting in a $484 million payout to consumers for predatory loan practices.

==== Internal Union Disputes ====
In 2003, ACORN faced a labor dispute within its own organization when field organizers attempted to unionize under the Service Employees International Union (SEIU). The National Labor Relations Board (NLRB) ruled that ACORN violated labor laws by retaliating against employees, leading to a legal battle over unionization rights.

==== Hurricane Katrina and Disaster Relief Efforts ====
In 2005, ACORN assisted low-income residents in New Orleans after Hurricane Katrina. It helped rebuild communities, fought against displacement, and pressured FEMA to provide greater assistance to affected families. The organization also advocated for renters’ rights, ensuring displaced tenants were not evicted from federally subsidized housing.

==== Political Engagement ====
By 2006, ACORN had established chapters in over 100 cities across 40 states. It played an active role in the 2006 midterm elections, advocating for progressive policies and pushing for increased access to voter registration and fair labor practices.

During this period, ACORN positioned itself as a nationally recognized force in social justice activism. However, accusations of voter registration fraud, labor disputes, and funding controversies began eroding its public image, leading into the challenges it faced in 2008 and beyond.

=== 2008–2009 ===
==== Accusations of voter fraud ====
ACORN has a legally distinct political action arm that frequently endorsed causes and candidates, including the 2008 Democratic presidential nominee Barack Obama. ACORN lobbied every Democratic National Convention since 1980 and had members elected as delegates to those conventions; ACORN also lobbied at Republican conventions. ACORN was criticized by Republicans for its support of Democratic candidates and for its general support of political positions that are more often favored by Democrats.

During the debate on the Emergency Economic Stabilization Act of 2008, some commentators claimed that a draft provision (omitted in the adopted bill) to give money to funds run by the U.S. Department of the Treasury could lead to money going to groups like ACORN. When asked how much money ACORN or other community groups would get, a spokesman for Financial Services Committee chairman Barney Frank, said, "Absolutely none. All funds would go to state and local governments." Critics also claimed that ACORN's complex organizational structure allowed it to escape public scrutiny.

ACORN was among groups conducting voter registration drives prior to the 2008 presidential election. The campaign for Republican presidential candidate John McCain alleged they were responsible for voter registration fraud and had a conflict of interest. During the 2008 Democratic Presidential Primary, ACORN's national political action committee, ACORN Votes, endorsed Barack Obama. Obama, with several other attorneys, had served as local counsel for ACORN more than a decade earlier in a 1995 voting rights lawsuit joined by the Justice Department and the League of Women Voters. Obama's campaign hired an ACORN affiliate for $800,000 to conduct a get-out-the-vote effort during that primary, but did not retain ACORN for the general presidential election.

Throughout the election season, supporters of Republican candidates alleged that ACORN was responsible for widespread vote fraud. In October 2008, McCain's campaign released a Web-based advertisement claiming ACORN was responsible for "massive voter fraud," a point that Sen. McCain repeated in the final presidential debate. FactCheck.org called this claim "breathtakingly inaccurate," but acknowledged that ACORN had problems with phony registrations. The ads also claimed that home loan programs ACORN promoted were partly responsible for the sub-prime mortgage crisis, claims which Newsweek and Factcheck.org also found to be exaggerated and inaccurate.

In a report released in October 2008, the U.S. Department of Justice Inspector General concluded that U.S. Attorney General Alberto Gonzales fired U.S. Attorney David Iglesias (one of nine US attorneys removed in 2006) for political reasons after Iglesias failed to prosecute a New Mexico ACORN chapter. The report said claims that Iglesias was fired for poor performance were not credible, and the "real reason for Iglesias's removal was the complaints from New Mexico Republican politicians and party activists about how Iglesias handled voter fraud [cases]." Iglesias did not believe there was sufficient evidence to support prosecution by the government.

A poll released in November 2009 by Public Policy Polling found that 26% of respondents overall, believed in a conspiracy theory that ACORN "stole" the election for Barack Obama. That number increased to 56% amongst Republicans polled. The Democratic polling organization commented that this was somewhat higher than belief in the birther conspiracy theories. (In a follow-poll in 2012, PPP found that 49% of Republicans, nearly the same percentage as in 2009, believed that ACORN had stolen the 2012 election for Obama, despite the fact that by then ACORN was no longer operating.)

==== Embezzlement ====
The New York Times reported on July 9, 2008, that Dale Rathke, the brother of ACORN's founder Wade Rathke, was found to have embezzled $948,607.50 from the group and affiliated charitable organizations in 1999 and 2000. ACORN executives decided to handle it as an internal matter, and did not inform most of the board members or law enforcement, and instead signed an enforceable restitution agreement with the Rathke family to repay the amount of the embezzlement. $210,000 has already been repaid, and a donor, Drummond Pike, has offered to pay the remaining debt. The Times reported that, according to Wade Rathke, "the decision to keep the matter secret was not made to protect his brother but because word of the embezzlement would have put a 'weapon' into the hands of enemies of ACORN, a liberal group that is a frequent target of conservatives who object to ACORN's often strident advocacy on behalf of low- and moderate-income families and workers." A whistleblower revealed the embezzlement in 2008. On June 2, 2008, Dale Rathke was dismissed, and Wade stepped down as ACORN's chief organizer, but he remains chief organizer for Acorn International L.L.C.

In September 2008, following revelations of Dale Rathke's embezzlement, two members of ACORN's national board of directors filed a lawsuit seeking to obtain financial documents and to force the organization to sever ties with Wade Rathke. ACORN's executive committee voted unanimously to remove the two, "because their actions—such as releasing a confidential legal memo to the press—were damaging the organization."

In October 2009, Louisiana Attorney General Buddy Caldwell claimed in a subpoena that ACORN's board of directors found that a larger amount—$5 million—had been embezzled from the organization. Bertha Lewis, ACORN's CEO, said the allegation is false. On November 6, following up on the subpoena, Caldwell served a search warrant at the ACORN headquarters in New Orleans. Caldwell stated, "This is an investigation of everything—Acorn, the national organization, the local organization and all of its affiliated entities."

==== Undercover videos controversy ====
In September 2009, Hannah Giles and James O'Keefe publicized hidden camera recordings through Fox News and Andrew Breitbart's website BigGovernment. In the videos, Giles posed as a prostitute and O'Keefe posed as her boyfriend in order to elicit damaging responses from employees of ACORN. The videos were recorded over the summer of 2009 while visiting ACORN offices in eight cities, and purported to show low-level ACORN employees in several cities providing advice to Giles and O'Keefe on how to avoid taxes and detection by the authorities with regard to their plans to engage in tax evasion, human smuggling, and child prostitution.

On December 7, 2009, the former Massachusetts Attorney General, after an independent internal investigation of ACORN, found the videos that had been released appeared to have been edited, "in some cases substantially". He found no evidence of criminal conduct by ACORN employees, but concluded that ACORN had poor management practices that contributed to unprofessional actions by a number of its low-level employees. On March 1, 2010, the District Attorney's office for Brooklyn determined that the videos were "heavily edited" and "many of the seemingly crime-encouraging answers were taken out of context so as to appear more sinister", and concluded that there was no criminal wrongdoing by the ACORN staff in the videos from the Brooklyn ACORN office. On April 1, 2010, an investigation by the California Attorney General found the videos from Los Angeles, San Diego and San Bernardino to be "heavily edited," and the investigation did not find evidence of criminal conduct on the part of ACORN employees. On June 14, 2010, the U.S. Government Accountability Office (GAO) released its findings which showed that ACORN evidenced no sign that it, or any of its related organizations, mishandled any federal money they had received.

===== Defund ACORN Act =====
In late 2009, after allegations of criminal activity due to the videos, a number of Democrats who once advertised their connections to ACORN began to distance themselves. In immediate response to the 2009 video controversy, the United States House and Senate, by wide margins, attached amendments to pending spending legislation that would temporarily prohibit the federal government from funding ACORN, or any agency that had been involved in similar scandals — including money authorized by previous legislation. President Obama signed the bill into law on October 1.

ACORN sued the United States Government in the United States District Court in Brooklyn over the measure, known as the "Defund ACORN Act", claiming it was a bill of attainder, and therefore unconstitutional. Experts varied on the merit of the case, which was styled ACORN v. United States. One argument was that while government funding choices do not generally qualify as bills of attainder, the lack of a non-punitive regulatory purpose for the legislation may give a court "sufficient basis to overcome the presumption of constitutionality." The court issued a preliminary injunction that nullified the act.

In response to an inquiry from a Housing and Urban Development Department lawyer, David Barron, the acting assistant attorney general for the Office of Legal Counsel, wrote a five-page memorandum concluding that the law does not prohibit the government from paying ACORN for services already performed. On December 11, U.S. District Judge Nina Gershon issued a preliminary injunction blocking the government from enforcing its temporary spending ban, a week before it was set to expire. The Government Accountability Office (GAO) opened an investigation of ACORN in December 2009. In June 2010, the GAO released a preliminary report stating the investigation has found no sign the group or related organizations mishandled the $40 million in federal money they received from nine federal agencies.

On August 13, 2010 the U.S. Court of Appeals for the Second Circuit reversed Judge Gershon's decision. The appeals court cited a study finding that only 10% of ACORN's funding came from federal sources, and stated, "We doubt that the direct consequences of the appropriations laws temporarily precluding ACORN from federal funds were so disproportionately severe or so inappropriate as to constitute punishment." The Center for Constitutional Rights, which had argued the case on ACORN's behalf, was considering a request for a rehearing by more judges of the 2nd Circuit.

==== Dissolution ====
On March 19, 2010, The New York Times reported that ACORN was on the verge of filing for bankruptcy; 15 of the group's 30 state chapters had disbanded over the previous six months, and other chapters (including the largest, in New York and California) renamed themselves and severed all ties to the national organization. Two unnamed ACORN officials told the Times that the following weekend, a teleconference was planned to discuss a bankruptcy filing; "private donations from foundations to Acorn [had] all but evaporated," and the federal government had distanced itself from the group. "[L]ong before the activist videos delivered what may become the final blow, the organization was dogged for years by financial problems and accusations of fraud." "That 20-minute video ruined 40 years of good work," said Sonja Merchant-Jones, former co-chairwoman of ACORN's recently closed Maryland chapter. "But if the organization had confronted its own internal problems, it might not have been taken down so easily."

On March 22, 2010, National ACORN spokesman Kevin Whelan says the organization's board decided to close remaining state affiliates and field offices by April 1 because of falling revenues. Other national operations continued operating for another several weeks before shutting for good. On April 20, ACORN CEO Bertha Lewis reported that ACORN was "still alive. We're limping along. We're on life support." Lewis said that ACORN's annual budget had been reduced from $25 million to $4 million, and that its staff of 350 to 600 people had been reduced to four. Lewis explained the controversies had left a stain on ACORN, "sort of like a scarlet letter," forcing the group to spend money defending itself against "one investigation after another."

== ACORN-affiliated groups ==
After the dissolution of ACORN in the US, some chapters continued operations by setting up new organization:

- Members and staff of California ACORN founded a new organization, the Alliance of Californians for Community Empowerment.
- New York ACORN founded New York Communities for Change.
- A Milwaukee offshoot of ACORN called Acorn Housing changed its name to Affordable Housing Centers of America yet has retained the same tax and employee identification numbers that it held under its former name.
- The Center for Popular Democracy includes many of the old chapters of ACORN.

After ACORN International was founded, groups in other countries became affiliated, include Living Rent in Scotland and Alliance Citoyenne in France.

== Bibliography ==
- Delgado, Gary (1986). Organizing the Movement: The Roots and Growth of ACORN. Philadelphia: Temple University Press. ISBN 0-87722-393-9. OCLC 12134922.
- Swarts, Heidi J. (2008). Organizing Urban America: Secular and Faith-based Progressive Movements. Minneapolis: University of Minnesota Press. ISBN 978-0-8166-4839-9.
- Atlas, John (2010). Seeds of Change: The Story of ACORN, America's Most Controversial Antipoverty Community Organizing Group. Nashville: Vanderbilt University Press. ISBN 978-0-8265-1705-0.
