= Madge Fagan =

Irish social activist (1923–2017)

- Fagan's obituary photo, published in The Herald in February 2018
- Born: Margaret Doherty; 6 February 1923; Dublin, Irish Free State
- Died: 11 February 2017 (aged 94); Dublin, Ireland
- Other name: Margaret Fagan
- Occupations: Social activist, caterer, cleaner
- Years active: 1960s–2017

Margaret Fagan (née Doherty; 6 February 1923 – 11 February 2017) was an Irish social and housing activist. She was born in Harold's Cross and lived in Pimlico, Dublin, before moving to Marrowbone Lane c. 1963. There, she founded the Marrowbone Lane Tenants Association. She was a prominent figure in the 1970–1973 Republic of Ireland rent strikes, and participated in the protests against the introduction of water charges in Ireland in 2016. She died in 2017 at St. James' Hospital.

== Life and career ==
Fagan was born on 6 February 1923 at 6 Reilly's Cottages, Harold's Cross to James and Mary Doherty, living in Pimlico, Dublin. She had 11 siblings. She went to school in Harold's Cross, leaving at 13 to become a tailor. She married Anthony Fagan c. 1955, having three children with him (one died in infancy).

She moved from Clanbrassil Street to a block of flats on Summer Street South and Marrowbone Lane c. 1963. She later founded the Marrowbone Lane Tenants Association in 1966 which joined the National Association of Tenants Organisations (NATO) after it was founded in 1967. NATO's General Secretary Matt Larkin was also a member of the Marrowbone Lane Tenants Association. Fagan was a prominent figure in the 1970–1973 Republic of Ireland rent strikes organised by NATO, aiding in resisting attempted evictions. After the rent strikes, she kept drug dealers out of the Marrowbone Lane Flats, and organised community events. She successfully protested a planned demolition of her home in 2008, and participated in the 2016 Ireland water charge protests.

She died on 11 February 2017 at St. James's Hospital in Dublin. She was buried at Mount Jerome Cemetery and Crematorium. In 2020, a mural of her was erected on Crane Street in The Liberties as part of Mná Meath Street. An entry on Fagan was added to the Dictionary of Irish Biography in November of that year.
