= Social Policy (magazine) =

Social Policy is a quarterly magazine focused on labor and community organizing around the world. Its contributors are a mixture of academics, activists, leaders, and organizers.

Social Policy is published by the Labor Neighbor Research and Training Center. Publisher and editor-in-chief is Wade Rathke, veteran community and labor organizer, and founder of Association of Community Organizations for Reform Now (ACORN) and ACORN International.

The magazine serves as a forum for dialog about a wide range of activities involving policy and social change both globally and domestically. Regular columns discuss global events, technology, campaign and corporate research, and historical trends in organizing and development. Each issue usually includes substantial excerpts of important new contributions in the literature. There are regular, annual reports on international dialogs to various countries that are written by members of the delegation traveling with the Organizers’ Forum. These reports have been filed from Turkey, Russia, Thailand, and Vietnam, for example.

== History ==
The magazine was established in 1970 by Frank Reisman of Columbia University, who served as the initial publisher and editor. He was succeeded by David Kallick, followed successively by Andy Humm in 1996 and then Mike "West Coast" Miller, with Rathke taking over in 2004.

In 2011, special issues have examined the state of organizing in the labor movement, the background of Barack Obama as a community organizer, the rebuilding of the Gulf Coast after Katrina, and the progress towards immigration reform in the United States. A program begun in 2011 also includes special on-line only features on topics of interest by authors such as Drummond Pike and Mike Miller and excerpts from Social Policy Press books.

== Social Policy Press ==
Social Policy Press, an imprint created by Social Policy magazine and LNRTC, has issued three books: Lessons from the Field: Organizing in Rural Communities (edited by Joe Szakos and Kristin Layng Szakos, 2008), Global Grassroots: Perspectives on International Organizing (edited by Wade Rathke, 2011), and Battle for the Ninth Ward: ACORN, Rebuilding New Orleans, and Lessons from Disaster (by Wade Rathke, 2011).

== Circulation ==
Social Policy's readership includes more than 600 libraries as subscribers worldwide, 1500 readers on the website monthly, and another 1500 individual subscribers. Subscribers can enlist through the website or by mail. The editorial offices are located in New Orleans, Louisiana and the printing is by a union company in Minneapolis, Minnesota.
