= Timeline of strikes in 1970 =

Strikes in 1970

In 1970, a number of labour strikes, labour disputes, and other industrial actions occurred.

== Background ==
A labour strike is a work stoppage caused by the mass refusal of employees to work. This can include wildcat strikes, which are done without union authorisation, and slowdown strikes, where workers reduce their productivity while still carrying out minimal working duties. It is usually a response to employee grievances, such as low pay or poor working conditions. Strikes can also occur to demonstrate solidarity with workers in other workplaces or pressure governments to change policies.

== Timeline ==
=== Continuing strikes from 1969 ===
- Delano grape strike
- 1969–1970 General Electric strike
- Hot Autumn, wave of strikes in Italy.
- 1969–1970 LKAB conflict, 8-week wildcat strike by LKAB miners in northern Sweden.

=== February ===
- 1970–1971 Newark teacher strikes. Two connected strikes, a 3-week strike in 1970 and an 11-week strike in 1971, by teachers in Newark, United States.

=== March ===
- 1970 Heathrow strike. 19-day strike by firefighters at Heathrow Airport, United Kingdom, over wages and working conditions.
- 1970–1973 Republic of Ireland rent strikes. Series of rent strikes by social housing tenants in Ireland, represented by the National Association of Tenants Organisations, over rent increases and decreases in the levels of services provided to the tenants.
- 1970 United States postal strike. 8-day wildcat strike by postal workers in the United States over low wages and poor working conditions.
- 1970 University of Wisconsin–Madison strike. 24-day strike by graduate students at the University of Wisconsin–Madison in the United States, represented by the Teaching Assistants Association. The first staff strike in the university's history.

=== April ===
- 1970 Goodyear strike. 1,5 month strike by Goodyear Tire and Rubber Company workers in the United States.
- 1970 Kansas City construction strike. 196-day strike by construction workers in Kansas City, United States.
- 1970 Minneapolis teachers' strike. 3-week strike by teachers in Minneapolis, United States, represented by the Minneapolis Federation of Teachers Local 59, over low wages and excessive class sizes.
- 1970 Pakistan journalists strike. 10-day strike by journalists in Pakistan.

=== May ===
- Irish bank strikes (1966–1976)
- Nationwide student anti-war strike of 1970

=== June ===
- 1970 Allied Corporation strike, 15-week strike by Allied Corporation workers in Buffalo, United States.
- June 15–16 events (Turkey).

=== July ===
- 1970 Granada construction strike. 8-day strike by construction workers in Granada, Spain, the first major strike in the city since the Spanish Civil War in the mid-1930s.
- 1970 Jackson strike, 3-week strike by Black municipal workers in Jackson, Mississippi.
- 1970 NFL strike
- 1970 United Kingdom dockers' strike

=== August ===
- 1970 GKN Sankey strike. 6-week wildcat strike by GKN Sankey workers in the United Kingdom.
- 1970 Rotterdam dockers strike. Major wildcat strike in the port of Rotterdam, the Netherlands.
- Salad Bowl strike

=== September ===
- 1970 UK local government strike. 6-week strike by local government workers in the United Kingdom.

=== November ===
- Colour Strike
- 1970 Folsom Prison strike
- 1970–1971 Harry Walker strike. 62-day strike by Harry Walker factory workers in Barcelona, Catalonia.
- 1970 Israeli teachers strike. 6-week strike by high school teachers in Israel.

=== December ===
- December 1970 protests in Poland

== Statistics ==
In the United States, the Bureau of Labor Statistics reported a total of 5716 work stoppages involved 824 000 workers in 1970 (for a total of 66,4 million working days lost), with 34 of those being major working stoppages involving at least 10 000 workers.

== Changes in legislation ==
In the United States, the state of Pennsylvania became the second state (after Hawaii) to guarantee public employees the right to strike.
