= Anti-internment rent and rates strike =

1971–1973 Northern Ireland protest

- Part of the Troubles and the Northern Ireland civil rights movement
- Date: Early 1970s
- Location: Northern Ireland
- Caused by: Internment in Northern Ireland
- Methods: Rent strike; Withholding council rates; Withholding gas and electricity payments; Boycott of local government; Mass demonstrations

Parties
Social Democratic and Labour Party; Northern Ireland Civil Rights Association	(United Kingdom) British government; Executive Committee for Northern Ireland

Number
23,000–30,000 households	
- A: Until 30 December 1973

In August 1971, the Government of Northern Ireland resumed their policy of internment without trial. In response, the Northern Ireland Civil Rights Association and the Social Democratic and Labour Party organised rent strikes and a strike of council rates in protest.

The strike took place across Northern Ireland, and was particularly active in the working-class neighborhoods of Belfast, Derry, Strabane and Newry.

== Background ==
The Government of Northern Ireland increasingly relied on harsh measures to curb the Northern Ireland Civil Rights Movement, such as the Criminal Justice (Temporary Provisions) Act (Northern Ireland) 1970, which imposed mandatory sentences for offenses during a declared 'emergency' period.

In August 1971, Brian Faulkner—the Prime Minister of Northern Ireland—re-introduced the policy of internment without trial in Northern Ireland. On the 9th of that month, the Royal Ulster Constabulary interned approximately 600 people as a part of Operation Demetrius.

This first sweep included many civil rights activists with no affiliation to any Republican paramilitary. Despite this, Brian Faulkner would claim "all internees are, on the evidence available, either members of the IRA or otherwise involved in terrorism". Those opposing internment were assumed to be sympathisers terrorism by authorities.

== Strike ==
Following a meeting of the parliamentary Social Democratic and Labour Party (SDLP), the party called for its supporters to join a rent strike in protest supported by the Northern Ireland Civil Rights Association (NICRA). On 27 August 1971, the SDLP and NICRA produced a joint statement in The Irish News promoting the strike, stating that no rent arrears would ever be paid for the period internment is in operation.

The rent strike began in August 1971, with tenants additionally refusing to pay gas or electricity bills. The Catholic community also began boycotting local government, and organised mass demonstrations in protest against internment.

Starting in 1972, the Northern Ireland government began taking the money directly from the pensions and benefits of strikers. As of 20 January, between 23,000 and 30,000 Catholic households were taking part in the strike, with approximately 10,000 of them suffering from pension and benefits deductions. The rent strike had been costing housing authorities around £60,058 a week (equivalent to £711,309 in 2025), and by mid January rent arrears totalled £600,576 (equivalent to £7,106,942 in 2025).

Authorities were reluctant to turn off electricity or gas to working class households not paying utility bills.

On 30 December 1973, SDLP called for an end to the rent and rates strike. NICRA refused stating that the SDLP did not have a mandate to end the strike.

== See also ==
- 1970–1973 Republic of Ireland rent strikes
- Dublin Housing Action Committee
- Derry Housing Action Committee
- Community Action Tenants Union

== Works cited ==
- Gilbert, Rosa (2017). "No Rent, No Rates: Civil Disobedience Against Internment in Northern Ireland, 1971-1974". Studi irlandesi. A Journal of Irish Studies. 7 (7): 19–43. doi:10.13128/SIJIS-2239-3978-20749. hdl:1814/59611. ISSN 2239-3978.
- Campbell, Sarah (2015). Gerry Fitt and the SDLP: ‘In a minority of one’. Manchester University Press. ISBN 978-0-7190-9610-5.
