= Greater Manchester Tenants Union =

Tenants' union in London

- Abbreviation: GMTU
- Type: Tenants union
- Methods: Advocacy, legal action, eviction defense
- Formerly called: Tenants Union UK

The Greater Manchester Tenants Union (GMTU, formerly Tenants Union UK) is a tenants union in Greater Manchester. The organization has been involved in several campaigns to protect and promote tenants rights in the region, including organizing to resist evictions, prevent the demolition of social housing projects and promote legislation that would limit short-term lets.

== History ==
It was founded by Laurence Jones-Williams alongside other tenants in Manchester. Prior to 2020, the Greater Manchester Tenants Union was known as Tenants Union UK, aiming to bring together all tenants groups in the UK. In 2020 the union's members decided to scale the union down to Greater Manchester. This decision was motivated by their belief that the organization would be more effective if it focused its efforts locally, rather than organizing on the national level.

== Structure ==
The GMTU is a democratic organization led by its members, serving all ten boroughs of Greater Manchester. Its operations are run by an elected committee with the support of union staff. The union is organized in several branches across Greater Manchester, including Stockport, Rochdale, Moss Side, Hulme and a branch for both Levenshulm and Longsight.

The union receives funds from dues set and paid by its members. Additional funds are provided by grants, including from the Nationwide Foundation, the Fair Housing Futures Test and Learn Fund and the New Economics Foundation.

== Campaigns ==
The GMTU's work focuses on advocating for tenants' rights to safe, affordable and secure housing. The union has organized against increasing rents, poor housing conditions, gentrification and abuse from landlords. Their work has led to payouts from landlords, the prevention of rent increases and eviction defense. The union also organizes "Know your Rights" sessions to educate people on their rights as tenants

The union has worked with Manchester City FC Fans Foodbank Support to provide free housing advice for dealing with housing insecurity to those attending Manchester City FC home games.

=== Block the Block ===
Block the Block was a campaign to prevent the establishment of a student housing block in Hulme.

=== Save the Seven Sisters ===
The Seven Sisters are a social housing development in Rochdale. In 2017, Rochdale Boroughwide Housing expressed its intent to demolish four of the seven buildings in the development. GMTU was involved in organizing a campaign to preserve the buildings.

=== Action on Empty Homes ===
The GMTU partnered with Action on Empty Homes to advocate for the adoption of legislation that would enable councils to prevent houses from being converted into short-term rentals. This regulation would particularly affect Airbnb lets, which housing advocates argue exacerbates the housing crisis. In 2021, the union published a report on the impacts of short-term lets on housing.

== See also ==
- Housing in the United Kingdom
- Living Rent
- ACORN the Union
- London Renters Union
