= Matt Larkin =

Irish rent protester

- Died: October 15, 2007
- Occupation: General Secretary of NATO
- Known for: Protesting rent

Matt Larkin Senior (died in 2007) was an Irish activist who served as the general secretary of the National Association of Tenants Organisations (NATO). He led a series of rent strikes in Ireland in the 1970s in response to poor housing conditions at the time.

In addition to being the general secretary of NATO, Larkin was a committee member on the Marrowbone Lane Tenants Association. He became general secretary at the same time NATO was founded in January 1967.

On 25 October 1968, Larkin told the Evening Herald that the explosion of a wall in Ballymun, and political infiltrations of the Drogheda Tenants' Organisation were part of an effort to "smash" NATO. He led the 1970–1973 Republic of Ireland rent strikes, a series of nationwide rent strikes held in response to poor housing conditions in Ireland. NATO had a membership of 100,000 houses at the time. The Catholic Church denounced Larkin for it, calling him a communist. As part of reviewing a film based on the event, Film Ireland called Larkin "the very essence of respectability", comparing him to Jim Larkin, who led a workers' revolution.

During the rent strikes, Garda Síochána tried to evict a family in the Cromcastle Court flats, causing locals to protest. Larkin joined in on the protests, gathering with them on a balcony. In 1979, Larkin was one of two Irish delegations sent to a congress of European tenant bodies held by the International Union of Tenants in Bern, Switzerland. In 1986, Sunday World said that he represented 500,000 people across Ireland.

He organized campaigns against rent in areas like Cork and Tullamore, creating propaganda for campaigns like these in Northern Ireland. He also spoke at the public meetings held by the Dublin Council of Trade Unions for the Rainbow Coalition. He wrote for Sinn Féin's newspaper United Irishman. He died on 15 October 2007.
