= Community Action Tenants Union =

Irish tenants' union

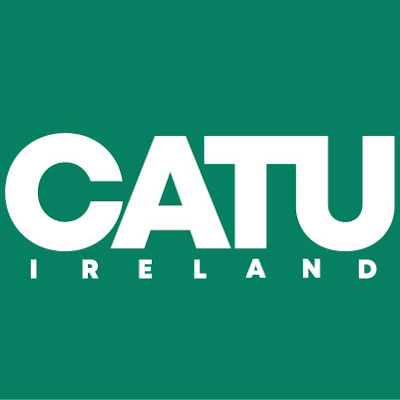
- Abbreviation: CATU
- Formation: October 2019; 6 years ago
- Type: Tenants' union
- Headquarters: Dublin, Ireland
- Members: c. 1,700 (2022)
- Affiliations: ACORN International
- Website: catuireland.org

Community Action Tenants Union is a national tenants' union in Ireland. Established in 2019, it is a mass membership organisation of "renters, council tenants, mortgage holders and people in emergency & precarious living situations".

CATU organises on an all-island basis, with branches across the North and South of the island. The union exists to defend members interests against evictions, rent increases, and the ongoing housing crisis.

CATU is affiliated to ACORN International.

== Structure ==
CATU members are organised in local branches across the island of Ireland, with committees elected by local members. A national committee coordinates the work of local branches. CATU organises campaigns at local and national level, and its work is grounded in principles of direct action.

The union's modelled after the Scottish tenants' union Living Rent, as well as being influenced by the work of the National Association of Tenants Organisations.

== History ==
CATU has its roots in advocacy and direct action groups, as some housing rights activists sought to move beyond advocacy and towards organising tenants. Early organisers worked with other organisations such as the Scottish tenants' union Living Rent to learn from their tactics. In addition to this, organisers were also inspired by the National Association of Tenants Organisations (NATO) which had represented tenants in Ireland in the 1960s and 1970s, and led a national rent strike in the early 70s. From these international and historical inspirations, the Community Action Tenants Union was founded in October 2019.

CATU's membership increased during the COVID-19 pandemic, when the union called for the Republic of Ireland to extend its COVID-19 eviction ban.

In 2023, a CATU branch in Derry was established.

CATU currently has over 38 branches across the island of Ireland, including branches in Cork, Galway, Dublin, Limerick, Kerry, Louth, Cavan, Wexford, Waterford, Belfast, Derry, Lisburn, and Monaghan.

== Campaigns ==
CATU has active public housing campaigns aimed at improving the conditions of tenants in public housing and increasing public housing stock. CATU branches have also been actively campaigning against the proliferation of short term lets, particularly in the West and South of the island.

In July 2025 the union held an all-island housing demonstration attended by 10,000 people. The march centred around key housing demands such as an increase of public housing, rent controls for private tenants, banning evictions and improving community services.

CATU has been opposed to new rent rules introduced by the Government of Ireland in 2026, and has denounced the introduction of the "market rent" rule which would allow landlords to reset rents to market rent in between tenancies or every 6 years. In 2025, the union gave a statement to the Dáil Housing Committee in relation to this legislation and the effect it would have. A few weeks later, opposition Teachta Dála's refused to sign off on the Government's proposals on the basis on these and other concerns.

=== Belfast ===
Since 2020, the Belfast branch of CATU has organised against unlawful letting fees, for efforts to mitigate the cost of living crisis, and for the introduction of an Eviction Ban. From June 2021, CATU Belfast was involved in protests against Kingspan Group's sponsorship of Ulster Rugby due to the use of their cladding in the Grenfell Tower fire. The organisation in Belfast has supported members dealing with long social housing waiting lists and inadequate temporary accommodation.

CATU Belfast staged an all day sit-in at the Northern Ireland Housing Executive on 7th May 2026. This was in response to the Housing Executive forcefully evicting a family from their West Belfast home the previous week. CATU has been involved in a long running campaign to address issues arising from the Northern Ireland Housing Executive's policy on succession of tenancy.

=== Cork ===
In 2021, the Cork branch of CATU highlighted dereliction in Cork city centre with posters and a walking tour.

=== Derry ===
The Derry branch of CATU was involved in setting up a new Derry Housing Action Committee in 2025.

=== Galway ===
The Galway branch of CATU launched a 'Homes not Holiday Lets' campaign in February 2025 targetting the proliferation of short-term lets in the county. The campaign draws attention to the disproportionate increase in AirBnB and other short-term rental accommodation in the Gaeltacht at the expense of long-term accommodation. Working alongside Conradh na Gaeilge, CATU aims to pressure local and national government to act to enforce existing legislation and introduce new measures to reduce the number of short-term lets in the county.

=== Waterford ===
CATU Waterford has been involved in defending members facing eviction by private landlords and member living in IPAS accommodation.
