= 2010 United States census =

23rd United States national census

Twenty-third census of the United States
- April 1, 2010
- Seal of the U.S. Census Bureau

- 2010 U.S. census logo

General information
- Country: United States

Results
- Total population: 308,745,538 (▲9.7%)
- Most populous state: California (37,253,956)
- Least populous state: Wyoming (563,826)

The 2010 United States census was the 23rd United States census. National Census Day, the reference day used for the census, was April 1, 2010. The census was taken via mail-in citizen self-reporting, with enumerators serving to spot-check randomly selected neighborhoods and communities. As part of a drive to increase the count's accuracy, 635,000 temporary enumerators were hired. The population of the United States was counted as 308,745,538, a 9.7% increase from the 2000 United States census. This was the first census in which all states recorded a population of over 500,000 people as well as the first in which all 100 largest cities recorded populations of over 200,000.

It was the first census since 1930 that California did not record the largest population growth in absolute number. Texas surpassed California's growth by 4.3 million to 3.4 million.

== Introduction ==
As required by the United States Constitution, the U.S. Census has been conducted every 10 years since 1790. The 2000 U.S. census was the previous census completed. Participation in the U.S. Census is required by law of people living in the United States in Title 13 of the United States Code.

On January 25, 2010, Census Bureau Director Robert Groves personally inaugurated the 2010 census enumeration by counting World War II veteran Clifton Jackson, a resident of Noorvik, Alaska. More than 120 million census forms were delivered by the U.S. Post Office beginning March 15, 2010. The number of forms mailed out or hand-delivered by the Census Bureau was approximately 134 million on April 1, 2010. Although the questionnaire used April 1, 2010, as the reference date as to where a person was living, an insert dated March 15, 2010, included the following printed in bold type: "Please complete and mail back the enclosed census form today."

The 2010 census national mail participation rate was 74%. From April through July 2010, census takers visited households that did not return a form, an operation called "non-response follow-up" (NRFU).

In December 2010, the U.S. Census Bureau delivered population information to the U.S. president for apportionment, and later in March 2011, complete redistricting data was delivered to states.

Personally identifiable information will be available in 2082.

== Major changes ==
The Census Bureau did not use a long form for the 2010 census. In several previous censuses, one in six households received this long form, which asked for detailed social and economic information. The 2010 census used only a short form asking ten basic questions:

1. How many people were living or staying in this house, apartment, or mobile home on April 1, 2010?
2. Were there any additional people staying here on April 1, 2010, that you did not include in Question 1? Mark all that apply: (checkboxes for: children; relatives; non-relatives; people staying temporarily; none)
3. Is this house, apartment, or mobile home – [Checkboxes for owned with a mortgage, owned free and clear, rented, occupied without rent.]
4. What is your telephone number?
5. What is Person 1's name? (last, first)
6. What is Person 1's sex? (male, female)
7. What is Person 1's age and Person 1's date of birth?
8. Is Person 1 of Hispanic, Latino, or Spanish origin? (checkboxes for: "No", and several for "Yes" which specify groups of countries)
9. What is Person 1's race? (checkboxes for 14 including "other". One possibility was "Black, African Am., or Negro")
10. Does Person 1 sometimes live or stay somewhere else? (checkboxes for "No", and several locations for "Yes")

The form included space to repeat some or all of these questions for up to twelve residents total.

In contrast to the 2000 census, an Internet response option was not offered, nor was the form available for download.

Detailed socioeconomic information collected during past censuses will continue to be collected through the American Community Survey. The survey provides data about communities in the United States on a 1-year or 3-year cycle, depending on the size of the community, rather than once every 10 years. A small percentage of the population on a rotating basis will receive the survey each year, and no household will receive it more than once every five years.

In June 2009, the U.S. Census Bureau announced that it would count same-sex married couples. However, the final form did not contain a separate "same-sex married couple" option. When noting the relationship between household members, same-sex couples who are married could mark their spouses as being "Husband or wife", the same response given by opposite-sex married couples. An "unmarried partner" option was available for couples (whether same-sex or opposite-sex) who were not married.

The Census 2010 Language Program was significantly expanded. Language assistance in 49 languages in the 2000 Census was increased to 59 languages in Census 2000. In addition to English, Census questionnaire was available in five non-English languages: Spanish, Chinese (simplified), Korean, Vietnamese, and Russian.

== Cost ==
The 2010 census cost $13 billion, approximately $42 per capita; by comparison, the 2010 census per-capita cost for China was about US$1 and for India was US$0.40. Operational costs were $5.4 billion, significantly under the $7 billion budget. In December 2010 the Government Accountability Office (GAO) noted that the cost of conducting the census has approximately doubled each decade since 1970. In a detailed 2004 report to Congress, the GAO called on the Census Bureau to address cost and design issues, and at that time, had estimated the 2010 census cost to be $11 billion.

In August 2010, Commerce Secretary Gary Locke announced that the census operational costs came in significantly under budget; of an almost $7 billion operational budget:

- $650 million was saved in the budget for the door-to-door questioning (NRFU) phase because 72% of households returned mailed questionnaires;
- $150 million was saved because of lower-than-planned costs in areas including Alaska and tribal lands; and
- the $800 million emergency fund was not needed.

Locke credited the management practices of Census Bureau director Robert Groves, citing in particular the decision to buy additional advertising in locations where responses lagged, which improved the overall response rate. The agency also has begun to rely more on questioning neighbors or other reliable third parties when a person could not be immediately reached at home, which reduced the cost of follow-up visits. Census data for about 22% of U.S. households that did not reply by mail were based on such outside interviews, Groves said.

== Technology ==
In 2005, Lockheed Martin won a six-year, $500 million contract to capture and standardize data for the census. The contract included systems, facilities, and staffing. The final value of that contract was in excess of one billion dollars. Information technology was about a quarter of the projected $11.3 billion cost of the decennial census. The use of high-speed document scanning technology, such as ImageTrac scanners developed by IBML, helped Lockheed Martin complete the project on schedule and under budget.

Due to the rise in social media and cell-phone usage in the U.S., the Census Bureau used research gathered through a cell-phone study in order to target media and ads to populations that were nonrespondents and promote census participation. This study also helped gauge the mindset of those who fail to respond, trying to figure out why.

This was the first census to use hand-held computing devices with GPS capability, although they were only used for the address canvassing operation. Enumerators (information gatherers) that had operational problems with the device understandably made negative reports. During the 2009 Senate confirmation hearings for Robert Groves, President Obama's Census Director appointee, there was much mention of contracting problems but very little criticism of the units themselves. The Census Bureau chose to conduct the primary operation, Non-Response Follow Up (NRFU), without using the handheld computing devices.

== Marketing and undercounts ==
Due to allegations surrounding previous censuses that poor people and non-whites are routinely undercounted, for the 2010 census, the Census Bureau tried to avoid that bias by enlisting tens of thousands of intermediaries, such as churches, charities and firms, to explain to people the importance of being counted.

There was a penalty of $100 for not completing some or all of the 2010 U.S. Census. Census Bureau director Robert Grove, however, wrote "the Census Bureau has rarely prosecuted failure to respond. While the rationale for the mandatory nature of the census still applies today, our message for the 2010 Census is about the common good benefits of participation". The fine for non-participation is much lower than that for reporting false information. In 2010, that penalty was $500.

The Association of Community Organizations for Reform Now (ACORN) was given a contract to help publicize the importance of the census count and to encourage individuals to fill out their forms. In September 2009, after controversial undercover videos showing four ACORN staffers giving tax advice to a man and a woman posing as a prostitute, the bureau canceled ACORN's contract. Various American celebrities, including Demi Lovato and Eva Longoria, were used in public service announcements targeting younger people to fill out census forms. Wilmer Valderrama and Rosario Dawson have helped spread census awareness among young Hispanics, a historically low participating ethnicity in the U.S. census. Rapper Ludacris also participated in efforts to spread awareness of the 2010 census.

The Census Bureau hired about 635,000 people to find those U.S. residents who had not returned their forms by mail; as of May 28, 2010, 113 census workers had been victims of crime while conducting the census. As of June 29, there were 436 incidents involving assaults or threats against enumerators, more than double the 181 incidents in 2000; one enumerator, attempting to hand-deliver the census forms to a Hawaii County police officer, was arrested for trespassing – the officer's fellow policemen made the arrest.

Some political conservatives and libertarians questioned the validity of the questions and even encouraged people to refuse to answer questions for privacy and constitutional reasons. Michele Bachmann, a former conservative Republican Representative from Minnesota, stated that she would not fill out her census form other than to indicate the number of people living in her household because "the Constitution doesn't require any information beyond that." Former Republican representative and Libertarian presidential candidate Bob Barr stated that the census has become too intrusive, going beyond the mere enumeration (i.e., count) intended by the framers of the U.S. Constitution. According to political commentator Juan Williams, "Census participation rates have been declining since 1970, and if conservatives don't participate, doubts about its accuracy and credibility may become fatal."

As a result, the Census Bureau undertook an unprecedented advertising campaign targeted at encouraging white political conservatives to fill out their forms, in the hope of avoiding an undercount of this group. The 2010 U.S. census was the primary sponsor at NASCAR races in Atlanta, Bristol, and Martinsville, and sponsored the No. 16 Ford Fusion driven by Greg Biffle for part of the season, because of a marketing survey that indicated most NASCAR fans lean politically conservative. It also ran an advertisement during the 2010 Super Bowl, and hired singer Marie Osmond, who is thought to have many conservative fans, to publicize the census.

== Reapportionment ==
Allocation of U.S. congressional districts following the 2010 census

The 435 seats of the House grouped by state, as apportioned after the 2010 census

The results of the 2010 census determined the number of seats that each state received in the United States House of Representatives starting with the 2012 elections. Consequently, this affected the number of votes each state had in the Electoral College for the 2012 presidential election.

Because of population changes, eighteen states had changes in their number of seats. Eight states gained at least one seat, and ten states lost at least one seat. The final result involved 12 seats being switched.

Gained four seats	Gained two seats	Gained one seat	Lost one seat	Lost two seats
Texas	Florida	Arizona; Georgia; Nevada; South Carolina; Utah; Washington	Illinois; Iowa; Louisiana; Massachusetts; Michigan; Missouri; New Jersey; Pennsylvania	New York; Ohio

== Controversies ==
Some objected to the counting of persons who are in the United States illegally. Senators David Vitter (R-LA) and Bob Bennett (R-UT) tried unsuccessfully to add questions on immigration status to the census form.

Organizations such as the Prison Policy Initiative argued that the census counts of incarcerated men and women as residents of prisons, rather than of their pre-incarceration addresses, skewed political clout and resulted in misleading demographic and population data. Many residents of prisons counted on the 2010 census were those who identify as Black and Hispanic. This could lead to the loss of resources for underserved minority communities.

The term "Negro" was used in the questionnaire as one of the options for African Americans (Question 9. What is Person (number)'s race? ... Black, African Am., or Negro) as a choice to describe one's race. Census Bureau spokesman Jack Martin explained that "many older African-Americans identified themselves that way, and many still do. Those who identify themselves as Negroes need to be included." The word was also used in the 2000 census, with over 56,000 people identifying themselves as "Negro". In response to complaints over the word's inclusion on the 2010 census, the Census Bureau announced in 2013 that it would stop using "Negro" going forward, with the 2014 American Community Survey census form being the first without the word.

The 2010 census contained ten questions about age, gender, ethnicity, home ownership, and household relationships. Six of the ten questions were to be answered for each individual in the household. Federal law has provisions for fining those who refuse to complete the census form.

Detroit Mayor Dave Bing held a press conference on March 22, 2011, to announce that the city would challenge its census results. The challenge, being led by the city's planning department, cited an inconsistency as an example showing a downtown census tract which lost only 60 housing units, but 1,400 people, implying that a downtown jail or dormitory was missed in canvassing.

NYC Mayor Michael Bloomberg held a conference on March 27, 2011, to announce that the city would also challenge his city's census results, specifically the apparent undercounting in the boroughs of Queens and Brooklyn. Bloomberg said that the numbers for Queens and Brooklyn, the two most populous boroughs, are implausible. According to the census, they grew by only 0.1% and 1.6%, respectively, while the other boroughs grew by between 3% and 5%. He also stated that the census showed improbably high numbers of vacant housing in vital neighborhoods such as Jackson Heights, Queens.

The District of Columbia announced in August 2011 that it would also challenge its census results. The Mayor's Office claimed that the detailed information provided for 549 census blocks is "nonsensical", listing examples of census data that show housing units located in the middle of a street that does not actually exist. However, officials do not believe the city's total population will drastically change as a result of the challenge.

== State rankings ==
The state with the highest percentage rate of growth was Nevada, while the state with the largest population increase was Texas. Michigan, the 8th largest by population, was the only state to lose population (although Puerto Rico, a U.S. territory, lost population as well), and the District of Columbia saw its first gain since the 1950s. The resident populations listed below do not include people living overseas. For Congressional apportionment, the sum of a state's resident population and its population of military personnel and federal contractors living overseas (but not other citizens overseas, such as missionaries or expatriate workers) is used.

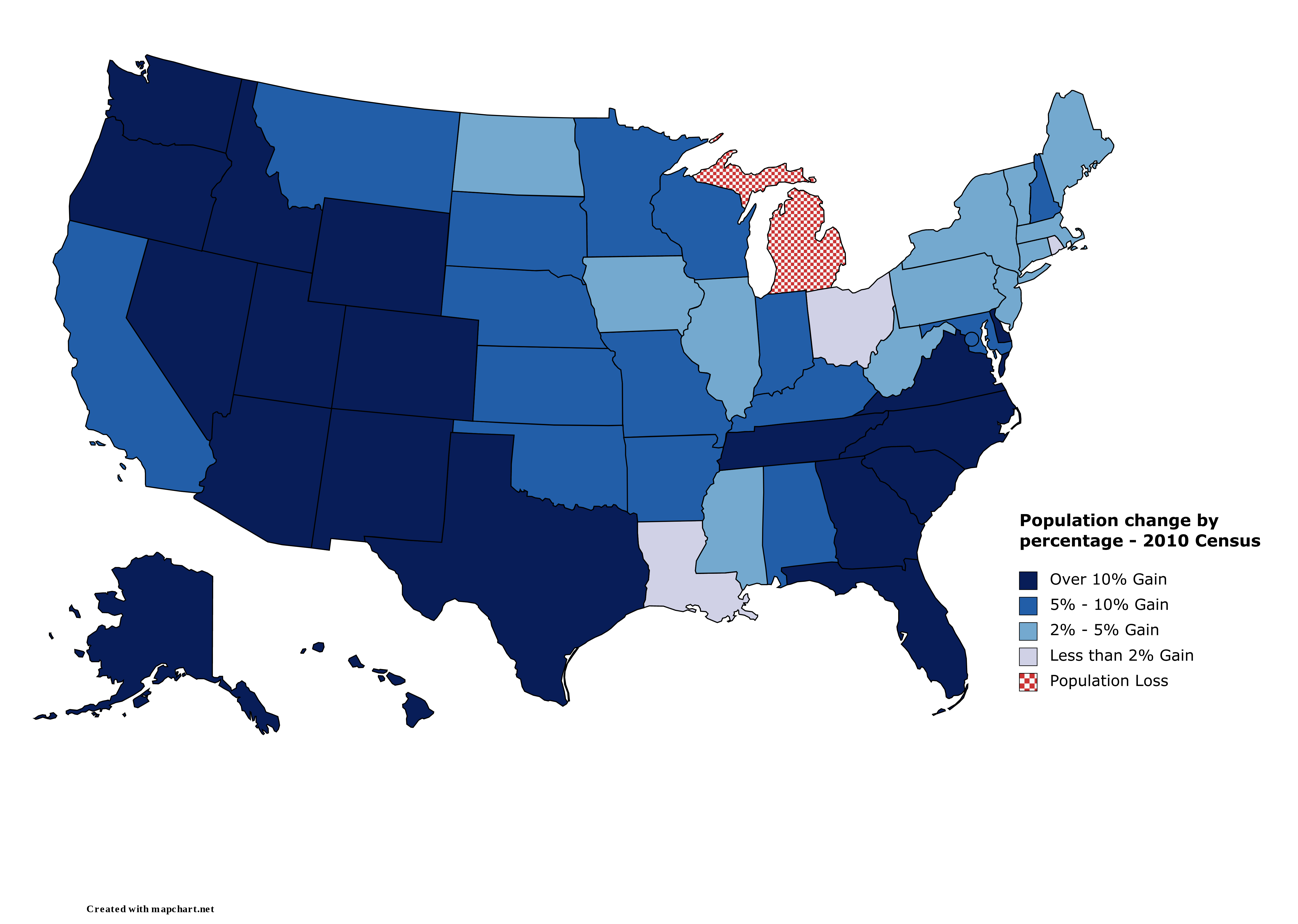
A map showing the population change of each US State by percentage.

Population and population change in the United States by state
Rank/ change		State	Population as of 2010 census	Population as of 2000 census	Change	Percent change
1	0	California	37,253,956	33,871,648	3,382,308 ▲	10.0% ▲
2	0	Texas	25,145,561	20,851,820	4,293,741 ▲	20.6% ▲
3	0	New York	19,378,102	18,976,457	401,645 ▲	2.1% ▲
4	0	Florida	18,801,310	15,982,378	2,818,932 ▲	17.6% ▲
5	0	Illinois	12,830,632	12,419,293	411,339 ▲	3.3% ▲
6	0	Pennsylvania	12,702,379	12,281,054	421,325 ▲	3.4% ▲
7	0	Ohio	11,536,504	11,353,140	183,364 ▲	1.6% ▲
8	0	Michigan	9,883,640	9,938,444	−54,804 ▼	−0.6% ▼
9	1	Georgia	9,687,653	8,186,453	1,501,200 ▲	18.3% ▲
10	1	North Carolina	9,535,483	8,049,313	1,486,170 ▲	18.5% ▲
11	2	New Jersey	8,791,894	8,414,350	377,544 ▲	4.5% ▲
12	0	Virginia	8,001,024	7,078,515	922,509 ▲	13.0% ▲
13	2	Washington	6,724,540	5,894,121	830,419 ▲	14.1% ▲
14	1	Massachusetts	6,547,629	6,349,097	198,532 ▲	3.1% ▲
15	1	Indiana	6,483,802	6,080,485	403,317 ▲	6.6% ▲
16	4	Arizona	6,392,017	5,130,632	1,261,385 ▲	24.6% ▲
17	1	Tennessee	6,346,105	5,689,283	656,822 ▲	11.5% ▲
18	1	Missouri	5,988,927	5,595,211	393,716 ▲	7.0% ▲
19	0	Maryland	5,773,552	5,296,486	477,066 ▲	9.0% ▲
20	2	Wisconsin	5,686,986	5,363,675	323,311 ▲	6.0% ▲
21	0	Minnesota	5,303,925	4,919,479	384,446 ▲	7.8% ▲
22	2	Colorado	5,029,196	4,301,261	727,935 ▲	16.9% ▲
23	0	Alabama	4,779,736	4,447,100	332,636 ▲	7.5% ▲
24	2	South Carolina	4,625,364	4,012,012	613,352 ▲	15.3% ▲
25	3	Louisiana	4,533,372	4,468,976	64,396 ▲	1.4% ▲
26	1	Kentucky	4,339,367	4,041,769	297,598 ▲	7.4% ▲
27	1	Oregon	3,831,074	3,421,399	409,675 ▲	12.0% ▲
28	1	Oklahoma	3,751,351	3,450,654	300,697 ▲	8.7% ▲
29	0	Connecticut	3,574,097	3,405,565	168,532 ▲	4.9% ▲
30	0	Iowa	3,046,355	2,926,324	120,031 ▲	4.1% ▲
31	0	Mississippi	2,967,297	2,844,658	122,639 ▲	4.3% ▲
32	1	Arkansas	2,915,918	2,673,400	242,518 ▲	9.1% ▲
33	1	Kansas	2,853,118	2,688,418	164,700 ▲	6.1% ▲
34	0	Utah	2,763,885	2,233,169	530,716 ▲	23.8% ▲
35	0	Nevada	2,700,551	1,998,257	702,294 ▲	35.1% ▲
36	0	New Mexico	2,059,179	1,819,046	240,133 ▲	13.2% ▲
37	0	West Virginia	1,852,994	1,808,344	44,650 ▲	2.5% ▲
38	0	Nebraska	1,826,341	1,711,263	115,078 ▲	6.7% ▲
39	0	Idaho	1,567,582	1,293,953	273,629 ▲	21.1% ▲
40	1	Hawaii	1,360,301	1,211,537	148,764 ▲	12.3% ▲
41	1	Maine	1,328,361	1,274,923	53,438 ▲	4.2% ▲
42	1	New Hampshire	1,316,470	1,235,786	80,684 ▲	6.5% ▲
43	0	Rhode Island	1,052,567	1,048,319	4,248 ▲	0.4% ▲
44	0	Montana	989,415	902,195	87,220 ▲	9.7% ▲
45	0	Delaware	897,934	783,600	114,334 ▲	14.6% ▲
46	0	South Dakota	814,180	754,844	59,336 ▲	7.9% ▲
47	1	Alaska	710,231	626,932	83,299 ▲	13.3% ▲
48	1	North Dakota	672,591	642,200	30,391 ▲	4.7% ▲
49	0	Vermont	625,741	608,827	16,914 ▲	2.8% ▲
—		District of Columbia	601,723	572,059	29,664 ▲	5.2% ▲
50	0	Wyoming	563,626	493,782	69,844 ▲	14.1% ▲
		United States	308,745,538	281,421,906	27,323,632 ▲	9.7% ▲

== Metropolitan rankings ==
These are core metropolitan rankings versus combined statistical areas. For full list with current data, go to metropolitan statistics.

The top 25 metropolitan statistical areas of the United States of America
Rank	Metropolitan statistical area	2010 census	Encompassing combined statistical area
1	New York-Newark-Jersey City, NY-NJ-PA Metropolitan Statistical Area	19,567,410	New York-Newark, NY-NJ-CT-PA Combined Statistical Area
2	Los Angeles-Long Beach-Anaheim, CA Metropolitan Statistical Area	12,828,837	Los Angeles-Long Beach, CA Combined Statistical Area
3	Chicago-Naperville-Elgin, IL-IN-WI Metropolitan Statistical Area	9,461,105	Chicago-Naperville, IL-IN-WI Combined Statistical Area
4	Dallas-Fort Worth-Arlington, TX Metropolitan Statistical Area	6,426,214	Dallas-Fort Worth, TX-OK Combined Statistical Area
5	Philadelphia-Camden-Wilmington, PA-NJ-DE-MD Metropolitan Statistical Area	5,965,343	Philadelphia-Reading-Camden, PA-NJ-DE-MD Combined Statistical Area
6	Houston-The Woodlands-Sugar Land, TX Metropolitan Statistical Area	5,920,416	Houston-The Woodlands, TX Combined Statistical Area
7	Washington-Arlington-Alexandria, DC-VA-MD-WV Metropolitan Statistical Area	5,636,232	Washington-Baltimore-Arlington, DC-MD-VA-WV-PA Combined Statistical Area
8	Miami-Fort Lauderdale-West Palm Beach, FL Metropolitan Statistical Area	5,564,635	Miami-Fort Lauderdale-Port St. Lucie, FL Combined Statistical Area
9	Atlanta-Sandy Springs-Roswell, GA Metropolitan Statistical Area	5,286,728	Atlanta–Athens-Clarke County–Sandy Springs, GA Combined Statistical Area
10	Boston-Cambridge-Newton, MA-NH Metropolitan Statistical Area	4,552,402	Boston-Worcester-Providence, MA-RI-NH-CT Combined Statistical Area
11	San Francisco-Oakland-Fremont, CA Metropolitan Statistical Area	4,335,391	San Jose-San Francisco-Oakland, CA Combined Statistical Area
12	Detroit-Warren-Dearborn, MI Metropolitan Statistical Area	4,296,250	Detroit-Warren-Ann Arbor, MI Combined Statistical Area
13	Riverside-San Bernardino-Ontario, CA Metropolitan Statistical Area	4,224,851	Los Angeles-Long Beach, CA Combined Statistical Area
14	Phoenix-Mesa-Scottsdale, AZ Metropolitan Statistical Area	4,192,887	
15	Seattle-Tacoma-Bellevue, WA Metropolitan Statistical Area	3,439,809	Seattle-Tacoma, WA Combined Statistical Area
16	Minneapolis-St. Paul-Bloomington, MN-WI Metropolitan Statistical Area	3,348,859	Minneapolis-St. Paul, MN-WI Combined Statistical Area
17	San Diego-Carlsbad, CA Metropolitan Statistical Area	3,095,313	
18	St. Louis, MO-IL Metropolitan Statistical Area	2,787,701	St. Louis-St. Charles-Farmington, MO-IL Combined Statistical Area
19	Tampa-St. Petersburg-Clearwater, FL Metropolitan Statistical Area	2,783,243	
20	Baltimore-Columbia-Towson, MD Metropolitan Statistical Area	2,710,489	Washington-Baltimore-Arlington, DC-MD-VA-WV-PA Combined Statistical Area
21	Denver-Aurora-Lakewood, CO Metropolitan Statistical Area	2,543,482	Denver-Aurora, CO Combined Statistical Area
22	Pittsburgh, PA Metropolitan Statistical Area	2,356,285	Pittsburgh-New Castle-Weirton, PA-OH-WV Combined Statistical Area
23	Portland-Vancouver-Hillsboro, OR-WA Metropolitan Statistical Area	2,226,009	Portland-Vancouver-Salem, OR-WA Combined Statistical Area
24	Charlotte-Concord-Gastonia, NC-SC Metropolitan Statistical Area	2,217,012	Charlotte-Concord, NC-SC Combined Statistical Area
25	San Antonio-New Braunfels, TX Metropolitan Statistical Area	2,142,508	

== City rankings ==

Rank	City	State	Population	Land area (square miles)	Population density (per square mile)	Region
1	New York	New York	8,175,133	302.6	27,016.3	Northeast
2	Los Angeles	California	3,792,621	468.7	8,091.8	West
3	Chicago	Illinois	2,695,598	227.6	11,843.6	Midwest
4	Houston	Texas	2,099,451	599.6	3,502.8	Southwest
5	Philadelphia	Pennsylvania	1,526,006	134.1	11,379.6	Northeast
6	Phoenix	Arizona	1,445,632	516.7	2,797.8	Southwest
7	San Antonio	Texas	1,327,407	460.9	2,880.0	Southwest
8	San Diego	California	1,307,402	325.2	4,020.3	West
9	Dallas	Texas	1,197,816	340.5	3,517.8	Southwest
10	San Jose	California	945,942	176.5	5,359.4	West
11	Jacksonville	Florida	821,784	747.0	1,100.1	Southeast
12	Indianapolis	Indiana	820,445	361.4	2,270.2	Midwest
13	San Francisco	California	805,235	46.9	17,169.2	West
14	Austin	Texas	790,390	297.9	2,653.2	Southwest
15	Columbus	Ohio	787,033	217.2	3,623.5	Midwest
16	Fort Worth	Texas	741,206	339.8	2,181.3	Southwest
17	Charlotte	North Carolina	731,424	297.7	2,456.9	Southeast
18	Detroit	Michigan	713,777	138.8	5,142.5	Midwest
19	El Paso	Texas	649,121	255.2	2,543.6	Southwest
20	Memphis	Tennessee	646,889	315.1	2,053.0	Southeast
21	Baltimore	Maryland	620,961	80.9	7,675.7	Northeast
22	Boston	Massachusetts	617,594	48.3	12,786.6	Northeast
23	Seattle	Washington	608,660	83.9	7,254.6	West
24	Washington	District of Columbia	601,723	61.0	9,864.3	Northeast
25	Nashville	Tennessee	601,222	475.1	1,265.5	Southeast
26	Denver	Colorado	600,158	153.0	3,922.6	West
27	Louisville	Kentucky	597,337	385.09	1,551.2	Southeast
28	Milwaukee	Wisconsin	594,833	96.1	6,189.7	Midwest
29	Portland	Oregon	583,776	134.3	4,346.8	West
30	Las Vegas	Nevada	583,756	135.8	4,298.6	West
31	Oklahoma City	Oklahoma	579,999	606.4	956.5	Southwest
32	Albuquerque	New Mexico	545,852	187.7	2,908.1	Southwest
33	Tucson	Arizona	520,116	226.7	2,294.3	Southwest
34	Fresno	California	494,665	112.0	4,416.7	West
35	Sacramento	California	466,488	97.9	4,764.9	West
36	Long Beach	California	462,257	50.3	9,190.0	West
37	Kansas City	Missouri	459,787	315.0	1,459.6	Midwest
38	Mesa	Arizona	439,041	136.5	3,216.4	Southwest
39	Virginia Beach	Virginia	437,994	249.0	1,759.0	Southeast
40	Atlanta	Georgia	420,003	133.2	3,153.2	Southeast
41	Colorado Springs	Colorado	416,427	194.5	2,141.0	West
42	Omaha	Nebraska	408,958	127.1	3,217.6	Midwest
43	Raleigh	North Carolina	403,892	142.9	2,826.4	Southeast
44	Miami	Florida	399,457	35.9	11,126.9	Southeast
45	Cleveland	Ohio	396,815	77.7	5,107.0	Midwest
46	San Juan	Puerto Rico	395,326	47.9	8,253.1	Territories
47	Tulsa	Oklahoma	391,906	196.8	1,991.4	Southwest
48	Oakland	California	390,724	55.8	7,002.2	West
49	Minneapolis	Minnesota	382,578	54.0	7,084.8	Midwest
50	Wichita	Kansas	382,368	159.3	2,400.3	Midwest
51	Arlington	Texas	365,438	95.9	3,810.6	Southwest
52	Bakersfield	California	347,483	142.2	2,443.6	West
53	New Orleans	Louisiana	343,829	169.4	2,029.7	Southeast
54	Honolulu	Hawaii	337,256	60.5	5,574.5	West
55	Anaheim	California	336,265	49.8	6,752.3	West
56	Tampa	Florida	335,709	113.4	2,960.4	Southeast
57	Aurora	Colorado	325,078	154.7	2,101.3	West
58	Santa Ana	California	324,528	27.3	11,887.5	West
59	Saint Louis	Missouri	319,294	61.9	5,158.2	Midwest
60	Pittsburgh	Pennsylvania	305,704	55.4	5,518.1	Northeast
61	Corpus Christi	Texas	305,215	160.6	1,900.5	Southwest
62	Riverside	California	303,871	81.1	3,746.9	West
63	Cincinnati	Ohio	296,943	77.9	3,811.8	Midwest
64	Lexington	Kentucky	295,803	283.6	1,043.0	Southeast
65	Anchorage	Alaska	291,826	1,704.7	171.2	West
66	Stockton	California	291,707	61.7	4,727.8	West
67	Toledo	Ohio	287,208	80.7	3,559.0	Midwest
68	Saint Paul	Minnesota	285,068	52.0	5,482.1	Midwest
69	Newark	New Jersey	277,140	24.2	11,452.1	Northeast
70	Greensboro	North Carolina	269,666	126.5	2,131.7	Southeast
71	Buffalo	New York	261,310	40.4	6,468.1	Northeast
72	Plano	Texas	259,841	71.6	3,629.1	Southwest
73	Lincoln	Nebraska	258,379	89.1	2,899.9	Midwest
74	Henderson	Nevada	257,729	107.7	2,393.0	West
75	Fort Wayne	Indiana	253,691	110.6	2,293.8	Midwest
76	Jersey City	New Jersey	247,597	14.8	16,729.5	Northeast
77	Saint Petersburg	Florida	244,769	61.7	3,967.1	Southeast
78	Chula Vista	California	243,916	49.6	4,917.7	West
79	Norfolk	Virginia	242,803	54.1	4,488.0	Southeast
80	Orlando	Florida	238,300	102.4	2,327.1	Southeast
81	Chandler	Arizona	236,123	64.4	3,666.5	Southwest
82	Laredo	Texas	236,091	88.9	2,655.7	Southwest
83	Madison	Wisconsin	233,209	76.8	3,036.6	Midwest
84	Winston-Salem	North Carolina	229,617	132.4	1,734.3	Southeast
85	Lubbock	Texas	229,573	122.4	1,875.6	Southwest
86	Baton Rouge	Louisiana	229,493	76.9	2,984.3	Southeast
87	Durham	North Carolina	228,330	107.4	2,126.0	Southeast
88	Garland	Texas	226,876	57.1	3,973.3	Southwest
89	Glendale	Arizona	226,721	60.0	3,778.7	Southwest
90	Reno	Nevada	225,221	103.0	2,186.6	West
91	Hialeah	Florida	224,669	21.5	10,449.7	Southeast
92	Chesapeake	Virginia	222,209	340.8	652.0	Southeast
93	Scottsdale	Arizona	217,385	183.9	1,182.1	Southwest
94	North Las Vegas	Nevada	216,961	101.3	2,141.8	West
95	Irving	Texas	216,290	67.0	3,228.2	Southwest
96	Fremont	California	214,089	77.5	2,762.4	West
97	Irvine	California	212,375	66.1	3,212.9	West
98	Birmingham	Alabama	212,237	146.1	1,452.7	Southeast
99	Rochester	New York	210,565	35.8	5,881.7	Northeast
100	San Bernardino	California	209,924	59.2	3,546.0	West

== Locations of 50 most populous cities ==
Location of 50 largest cities by population in the United States in 2010

== See also ==
- 2010 in the United States
- United States census
