= ACORN 2009 undercover videos controversy =

Controversy involving covert, edited recordings of ACORN staffers

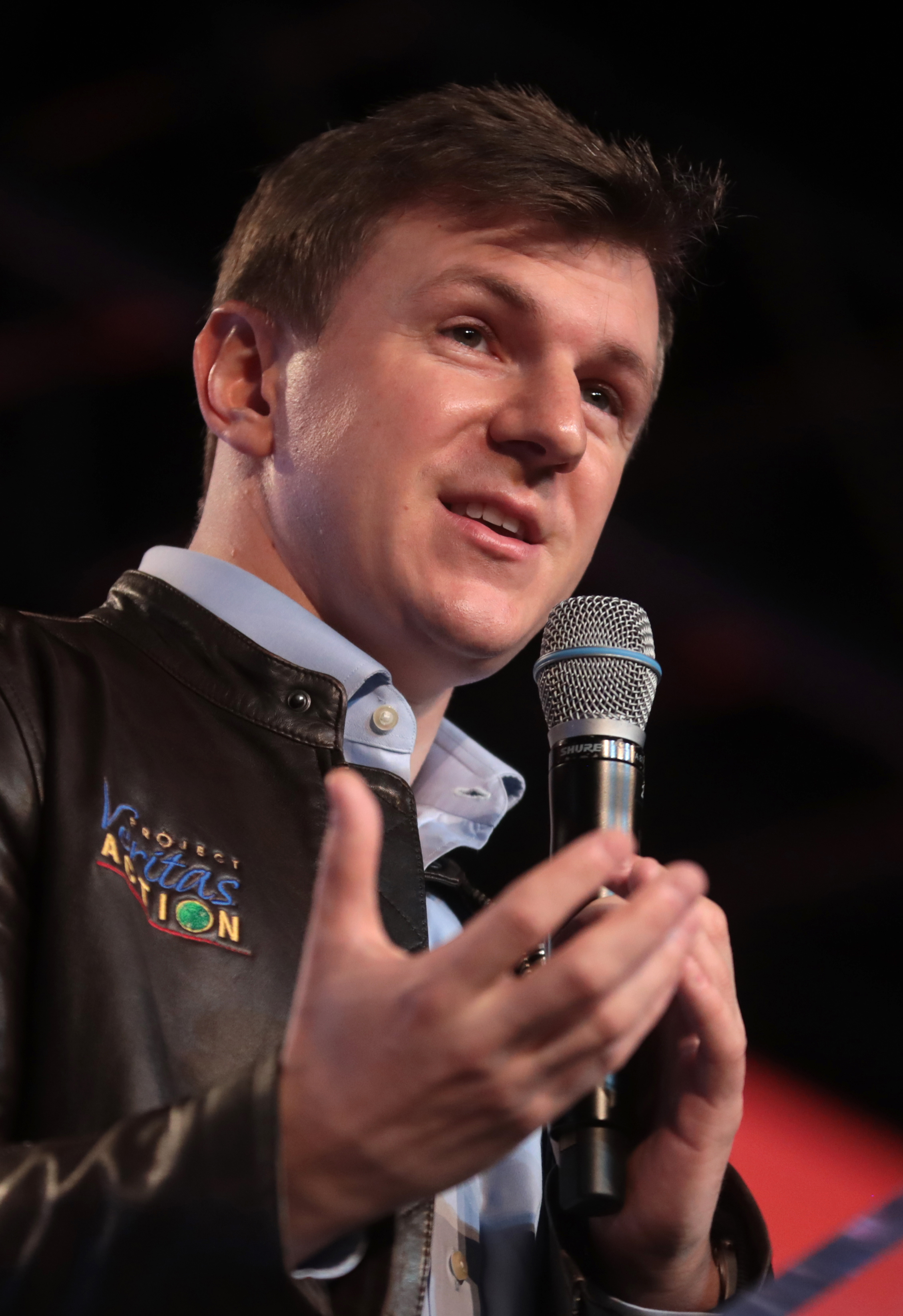
James O'Keefe, who, along with Hannah Giles, made videos about ACORN

In 2009, workers at offices of the Association of Community Organizations for Reform Now (ACORN), a collection of autonomous community-based organizations that advocated for low and moderate income families, were secretly recorded by conservative activists Hannah Giles and James O'Keefe. The videos purported to show low-level ACORN employees in several cities providing advice to Giles and O'Keefe on how to avoid taxes and detection by the authorities with regard to their plans to engage in tax evasion, human smuggling and child prostitution.

The videos were published on Andrew Breitbart's website BigGovernment from September through November 2009. They generated extensive, negative publicity for ACORN, and led to the United States Census Bureau and the IRS ending their contracts with ACORN, the U.S. Congress suspending its funding, and ACORN losing most of its private funding. This was despite several independent investigations that by December 2009 appeared to reveal that no criminal activity by ACORN staff had taken place.

ACORN filed for Chapter 7 liquidation on November 2, 2010, effectively closing the organization.

== Hannah Giles and James O'Keefe ==
Hannah Giles is an American conservative activist who achieved national attention alongside James O'Keefe as a featured player in videos they had secretly filmed in encounters at offices belonging to ACORN. At the time, Giles was studying journalism at Florida International University. Giles and O'Keefe spent $1,300 to accomplish what The Washington Post reporters called a "Mission to Fell ACORN".

O'Keefe, an activist-filmmaker and self-described "progressive radical" (media coverage describes him as a conservative), worked for Morton Blackwell at the Leadership Institute. He has made additional secret videos since then which were found to have been heavily edited to misrepresent his subjects, or present them in the worst light.

== Hidden camera recordings and video releases ==
In July and August 2009, Giles and O'Keefe visited ACORN offices in Baltimore, Washington, D.C., Brooklyn, San Bernardino, San Diego, Philadelphia, Los Angeles, and Miami. Giles dressed as a prostitute, while O'Keefe wore white khakis with a blue dress shirt and/or tie and claimed to be her boyfriend. Giles and O'Keefe recorded the encounters using hidden cameras and pretended to be seeking advice on how to run an illegal business that included the use of underage girls in the sex trade.

=== September 2009 ===
Videos from the visits to ACORN offices in Baltimore, Washington, D.C., Brooklyn, San Bernardino, and San Diego were released between September 10 and September 17, 2009, and were used to launch Andrew Breitbart's BigGovernment website.

In the videos, O'Keefe included lead-in segments in which he wore a fur coat, top hat, sunglasses, and wielded a cane, giving viewers and the media the impression that he had dressed that way when visiting the ACORN offices. His critics cite this as one of the ways he distorted the videos, since he actually dressed professionally during his ACORN visits, though he never revealed himself on camera in the ACORN offices.

The Baltimore employees were fired by ACORN after the video was released.

Tresa Kaelke, a California employee on the videos, stated she believed the activists were joking and made a variety of absurd or joking statements to them. She said they were "somewhat entertaining, but they weren't even good actors." On the other hand, her office supervisor, Christina Spach, said Kaelke "pretended to cooperate with O'Keefe and Giles because she feared for her safety." Kaelke responded to the pair's requests for help setting up a child-prostitution ring on the video by claiming to be an ex-prostitute and exclaiming, "Heidi Fleiss is my hero!" The California Attorney General's investigation of Kaelke determined that "none of her claims" on the video were true, that "she was playing along with what she perceived as a joke", and there was "no evidence she had ever engaged in prostitution." According to CNN, the filmmakers released a transcript of their discussion with Kaelke that included a comment left out of the originally released tape in which Kaelke said that ACORN would have nothing to do with their prostitution business. Kaelke was fired by ACORN after the videos were released.

In the San Diego office, edited video showed ACORN employee Juan Carlos Vera telling O'Keefe he had "contacts" in "Tijuana" to help get underage girls across the border. But, after the discussion with O'Keefe, Vera reported O'Keefe's fabricated plan for human smuggling to police. Vera was fired for what ACORN called "unacceptable conduct". Vera had said he tried to help the fake prostitute because she said that she needed to escape her controlling pimp. On July 8, 2010, after the AG's Report confirmed that he had contacted the police to try to thwart the couple's smuggling plan, Vera filed a civil suit in U.S. District Court for the Southern District of California against O'Keefe and Giles for recording him without his permission, which was a violation of California law. In July 2012, Giles settled the case paying Vera $50,000, and in March 2013, O'Keefe settled, paying $100,000.

== ACORN response ==
In response to release of the first videos, ACORN CEO Bertha Lewis said on Fox News on September 20, 2009, "[i]n a way, this was good for us, so what it did was show up to us what weaknesses we have, and we have moved swiftly ... in order to correct that." She said that after viewing the tapes, she had fired all the employees featured and had begun a comprehensive external investigation. As ACORN learned more from its employees of what had taken place, it called the videos "false" and "defamatory". A spokesman accused O'Keefe of dubbing the audio on the videos. On September 23, 2009, ACORN filed suit in a Baltimore court against the filmmakers, citing "extreme emotional distress" of the ACORN workers and violation of two-party consent recording laws. It later allowed the suit to lapse.

=== October 2009 ===
On October 21, O'Keefe and Giles released video footage of their visit to the Philadelphia office of ACORN at a National Press Club conference. They claimed it was to show they had received help there, after an ACORN spokesman had said that the pair had been asked to leave the Philadelphia office. The Washington Post "obtained a July 24 police report that showed police were called when O'Keefe and Giles attempted their sting at ACORN's Philadelphia offices—and that the couple were escorted out of those offices." Susan Kinzie of The Washington Post noted that "the heavily edited footage includes audio of the two conservatives but none of the ACORN Housing Corp. worker's responses to their questions." Junette Marcano, a board member of Philadelphia ACORN, said, "This is a targeted assault to disenfranchise our members because ... the right-wing agenda is to stop us from empowering people of low and moderate incomes. When you make the poor powerful, the powerful feel threatened."

Carol Leonnig, a The Washington Post staff writer who attended the press conference, said in an interview that day on Fox News that, in explaining why the audio portion did not include the worker's responses, O'Keefe said, "on the one hand, the pair are concerned about the legal ramifications." O'Keefe claimed secondly "that the tape battery died." Commenting on the Philadelphia video, Leonnig said "when you go to this office, and you see this tape, I don't think he's got the goods to say that ACORN lied." Both Giles and O'Keefe declined to answer questions after the release of the October video.

October press conference release
ACORN Office Location	Video release date	Transcript release date	Date video taken	Number of videos / total time	Transcript
Philadelphia	2009-10-21	Not available	2009-07-24	1 / Unknown	Not released

== Aftermath for ACORN ==
On March 19, 2010, The New York Times reported that ACORN was on the verge of filing for bankruptcy; 15 of the group's 30 state chapters had disbanded over the past six months, and other chapters (including the largest, in New York and California) had renamed themselves and severed all ties to the national organization. Two unnamed ACORN officials told the Times that the following weekend, a teleconference was planned to discuss a bankruptcy filing; "private donations from foundations to ACORN [had] all but evaporated." The federal government had ended contracts with the group related to organizing counts in urban areas for the Census and work for the IRS. "[L]ong before the activist videos delivered what may become the final blow, the organization was dogged for years by financial problems and accusations of fraud." Former co-chairwoman of ACORN's Maryland chapter Sonja Merchant-Jones said: "That 20-minute video ruined 40 years of good work. But if the organization had confronted its own internal problems, it might not have been taken down so easily."

On March 22, 2010, National ACORN spokesman Kevin Whelan says the organization's board decided to close remaining state affiliates and field offices by April 1 because of falling revenues. On April 20, the ACORN CEO Bertha Lewis reported that ACORN was "still alive. We're limping along. We're on life support." Lewis said that ACORN's annual budget had been reduced from $25 million to $4 million, and that its staff of 350 to 600 people had been reduced to four. Lewis explained the controversy had left a stain on ACORN, "sort of like a scarlet letter." It had forced the group to spend money to respond to "one investigation after another."

== Response by government and state authorities ==
President Barack Obama stated the video content was "certainly inappropriate and deserves to be investigated." ACORN's partnership in the 2010 United States census was terminated on September 11, 2009. The United States Senate voted to exclude ACORN from federal funding on September 14, and the House of Representatives voted 345–75 to eliminate federal funding to ACORN on September 17. John Boehner (R-Ohio), House minority leader at the time, introduced HR 3571 the "Defund ACORN Act" on September 15, and Rep. Darrell Issa (R-California) moved to incorporate that bill as an amendment to the Student Aid and Fiscal Responsibility Act of 2009 (HR 3221). Both resolutions were later nullified in a federal court ruling by Judge Nina Gershon that the measures were an unconstitutional bill of attainder. On August 13, 2010, however, a federal appeals court reversed that decision, and upheld the Congressional resolutions that cut off federal funding for ACORN.

On September 23, the Internal Revenue Service removed ACORN from its volunteer tax-assistance program. On September 24, the U.S. Treasury Department's Inspector General announced it would initiate a broader probe into "the government's oversight of tax-exempt organizations like ACORN when they engage in political activities."

== Investigations of ACORN and the videos ==
=== Independent external investigation by Proskauer Rose ===
On September 16, 2009, ACORN suspended advising new clients and initiated an independent review process, headed by Scott Harshbarger, an attorney from the Proskauer Rose firm and a former Massachusetts Attorney General. On September 16, Bertha Lewis, ACORN's CEO, froze admission to all of ACORN's service programs and instituted a review committee to implement organizational reforms. The independent external investigation found that while some of the counsel given by employees and volunteers was "unprofessional and inappropriate", the videos that had been released appeared to have been edited, "in some cases substantially", and ACORN employees had taken no illegal actions.

=== Report by the Congressional Research Service ===
On December 22, 2009, the Congressional Research Service (CRS) released a report on ACORN activities, commissioned by the House Judiciary Committee. It stated that ACORN had not been found to violate any federal regulations in the past five years. The report's other findings included that there were no instances of voter fraud by people who were allegedly registered to vote improperly by ACORN or its employees, and no instances where ACORN violated terms of federal funding in the last 5 years. The CRS found that O'Keefe and Giles may have violated Maryland and California laws banning the recording of face-to-face conversations without consent of both parties.

=== Investigation by New York attorney general ===
The New York Attorney General, Andrew Cuomo, began an investigation on September 15, 2009, to ensure that state grants given to ACORN were properly spent. The New York City Council suspended all ACORN grants while the Brooklyn District Attorney's Office conducted an investigation into the circumstances surrounding the videos. On March 1, 2010, the Brooklyn District Attorney's office determined that the videos were "heavily edited" to give a misleading impression, and concluded that there was no criminal wrongdoing by the ACORN Brooklyn staff filmed in the videos. A law enforcement source said, "They edited the tape to meet their agenda."

=== Investigation by California attorney general ===
On September 25, 2009, in response to Governor Schwarzenegger's request to investigate the incidents, the California Attorney General's office opened an investigation "into the controversy surrounding videos that purportedly show members of community organizing group ACORN giving advice on how to open a brothel."

On April 1, 2010, Attorney General Jerry Brown announced the office's findings, based on its review of new unedited videotapes recorded in the California offices of ACORN, as well as other evidence. The AG had granted O'Keefe and Giles immunity from prosecution in exchange for the raw videotapes. The report noted that the terms of the exchange did not exempt O'Keefe or Giles from being sued separately by the ACORN members filmed in the videos. Citing the 1967 Invasion of Privacy Act, Attorney General Office's report stated, "an application of these principles to the facts presented here strongly suggests that O'Keefe and Giles violated state privacy laws and provides fair warning to them and others that this type of activity can be prosecuted in California."

The Attorney General Office criticized O'Keefe for not acting as a journalist trying to objectively report a story from the facts, noting instead that O'Keefe stated he "was out to make a point and to damage ACORN." The report said:

The video releases were heavily edited to feature only the worst or most inappropriate statements of the various ACORN employees and to omit some of the most salient statements by O'Keefe and Giles. Each of the ACORN employees recorded in California was a low level employee whose job was to help the needy individuals who walked in the door seeking assistance. Giles and O'Keefe lied to engender compassion, but then edited their statements from the released videos.

For instance, one much-publicized recording had shown O'Keefe and Giles at the San Diego office. They show a worker purportedly seeking information from a contact in Mexico to help them smuggle underage girls from Mexico into the United States to work as prostitutes. The video did not show that the worker's "contact" in Mexico was a police official. The employee collected as much specific information from Giles and O'Keefe as possible during their visit. The worker then contacted Mexican police to warn them of the plot. The AG Office's report stated, "ACORN was not the criminal enterprise described by O'Keefe in his 'Chaos for Glory' statement – it did not receive billions in federal funds and did not control elections. ACORN is, however, disorganized and its operations were far from transparent, leaving it vulnerable to allegations of illegal activity and misuse of funds." The report also noted that despite O'Keefe's appearing in the released videos in "stereotypical 1970s pimp garb", in his actual taped sessions with ACORN workers, he was dressed in a shirt and tie, presented himself as a law student, and said he planned to use the prostitution proceeds to run for Congress, and never claimed he was a pimp.

The report of the Attorney General Office concluded, "Even if O'Keefe and Giles had truly intended to break the law, there is no evidence that any of the ACORN employees had the intent to aid and abet such criminal conduct or agreed to join in that illegal conduct." While faulting a few of the recorded ACORN members for "terrible judgment and highly inappropriate behavior", the investigation report also concluded that "ACORN could determine that the conduct of its employees in California was inappropriate, but that is an employment matter, which does not rise to the level of a law enforcement or governmental concern". The report determined that the employees did not commit prosecutable crimes in California. Regarding this contrast between the publicity related to the videos and what actually transpired, Attorney General Brown stated, "The evidence illustrates that things are not always as partisan zealots portray them through highly selective editing of reality. Sometimes a fuller truth is found on the cutting room floor."

=== Investigation by the U.S. Government Accountability Office ===
On June 14, 2010, the U.S. Government Accountability Office (GAO) released its findings on ACORN, by then disbanded. It said that there was no evidence that the group, or any of its related organizations, mishandled any of the $40 million in federal money that they had received in recent years.

== Media controversy ==
On September 15, Joshua Rhett Miller of Fox News accused the mainstream media of purposefully ignoring the story, and said that it was favoring the political left. Andrew Breitbart wrote in an article in The Washington Times that he had counseled Giles and O'Keefe to "offer Fox News the full footage of each video before each was released." Breitbart said he developed a strategy to counter such presumed liberal media bias by courting the Fox News Corporation: "We had to devise a plan that would force the [other news] media to see the evidence before they had enough time to destroy these two idealistic 20-something truth seekers." Giles was interviewed exclusively by Fox commentator Glenn Beck on the day of the first video's release.

CBS began to cover the story on September 11, the day after the story aired on Fox News. Breitbart and reporters of Fox News stayed on message, complaining that the "mainstream media" did not respond promptly or cover the story in sufficient depth. On September 11, 2009, Glenn Beck was reported to have said, "FOX has had 133 reports on it, CNN, 90, MSNBC, 10. How's that possible? Hey, ABC, how's it working out for you with two?"

Fox News said that, as late as September 15, the ABC anchor Charlie Gibson was unfamiliar with the story. It did not report that ABC's Jake Tapper had been covering the issue since September 11. In a September 15 interview with Sean Hannity of Fox News, Breitbart said that O'Keefe and Giles "have been impugned in the media." Hannity said they had been "excoriated".

Clark Hoyt, the New York Times public editor at the time, reviewed the raw footage and concluded that, regarding the statements by ACORN workers, “the most damning words match the transcripts and the audio, and do not seem out of context.”

== Criticisms of the undercover videos ==
In September 2009, before the investigations revealed the selective and heavy editing of the videos, Alexandra Fenwick of the Columbia Journalism Review accused the video ensemble of being a politically motivated piece that lacked context and did not present accurate information. She characterized the work as raw information instead of journalism. She said some elements of the ACORN videos seemed "shadows of journalism's muckraking past" and were commendable. The videos were criticized by MSNBC's Norah O'Donnell, who suggested the use of hidden cameras was a form of entrapment.

The Washington Post staff writers Darryl Fears and Carol D. Leonnig wrote:

Giles and O'Keefe have been criticized for accuracy problems. Their videos include the oft-repeated conservative claim that ACORN is expected to get up to $8.5 billion in government funds. But that's a bold exaggeration, as it includes $3 billion in stimulus funds set aside for revitalization efforts nationwide, and $5.5 billion in federal community development grants.

The more than $8 billion number was based on the false assumption that ACORN would apply for and win every project and grant in the country, and in fact ACORN did not apply for any of the stimulus funds. Leonnig also observed:

the videos, in some cases, left out what I would call some exculpatory material ... for example, in one, a San Berna[r]dino employee at ACORN explains that there is no way ACORN would support what the couple were proposing, and she asks if they are putting her on, candid-camera style.

During a September 14 television appearance on Fox, O'Keefe appeared dressed in a fur coat, sunglasses, and holding a cane. The host announced: "[O'Keefe] is dressed exactly in the same outfit that he wore to these ACORN offices up and down the eastern seaboard." He asked, "[I]s that what you think a pimp looks like?" O'Keefe answered yes. Within weeks, political journalist Mike Stark revealed that O'Keefe did not wear such clothing to the ACORN offices, but rather he wore subdued clothing and a tie, and in one instance posed as a candidate for Congress. Stark said, "If they really wanted the truth out there, why do they need to edit these tapes in the first place? Why aren't the unedited videos already in the public domain?"

For some - including The Daily Show presenter Jon Stewart, previously convinced by O'Keefe and Giles' videos - O'Keefe's involvement in the attempted tapping of Democratic Senator Mary Landrieu's office phones in early 2010 cast doubt on the accusations against ACORN, with Robert Schlesinger, for example, asking, "If he [O'Keefe] is willing to break the law, wouldn't he be willing to shade the truth in the ways the ACORN supporters have accused?".

The Brooklyn District Attorney Charles Hynes cleared ACORN employees in the local office of criminal wrongdoing on March 1, 2010, after a five-month investigation. The Daily News quoted a law enforcement source saying that "They edited the tape to meet their agenda". The ACORN lawyer Arthur Schwartz commented that ACORN was "gratified that the DA has concluded something we knew all along." He said that O'Keefe and Giles had "used subterfuge to convince Congress and the media to vilify an organization that didn't deserve it."
