= Cost of Living (Tenant Protection) (Scotland) Act 2022 =

Act of the Scottish Parliament

- Act of the Scottish Parliament
- Scottish Parliament
- Long title: An Act of the Scottish Parliament to make provision in connection with protecting residential tenants from increases in rent; protecting residential tenants from eviction; and for connected purposes.
- Citation: 2022 asp 10
- Introduced by: Patrick Harvie MSP, Minister for Zero Carbon Buildings, Active Travel and Tenants’ Rights
- Territorial extent: Scotland

Dates
- Royal assent: 27 October 2022

Status: Current legislation

History of passage through the Parliament

Text of statute as originally enacted

Text of the Cost of Living (Tenant Protection) (Scotland) Act 2022 as in force today (including any amendments) within the United Kingdom, from legislation.gov.uk.

The Cost of Living (Tenant Protection) (Scotland) Act 2022 (asp 10) is an act of the Scottish Parliament which came into force on 27 October 2022.

The act froze rents and established a moratorium on evictions for both the private rented and social sectors until at least 31 March 2023.

== Summary ==
The provisions of the act were considered by Scottish Ministers to be necessary or proportionate in connection with the cost of living. The act restricts landlords from increasing the amount of rent they shall charge on residential tenancies, restricts evictions from residential tenancies, and allows Scottish Ministers to make regulations about matters a rent officer or a First-tier Tribunal must consider in determining rent. The permitted rate of 0% rent increase from 6 September 2022 is defined within the meaning of section 24A(1) of the Housing (Scotland) Act 2001.

The main provisions of the act were set to expire at the end of 31 March 2023, however, this date was amended to 30 September 2023. This date of 30 September 2023 may be amended by Scottish Ministers, and was extended to 31 March 2025 in March 2024, before finally expiring.

The permitted rate of 3% rent increase was set for the duration of 1 April 2023 to 30 September 2023.

== Background ==
The United Kingdom cost of living crisis is an ongoing event starting in 2021, in which prices for essential goods and services in the United Kingdom began increasing faster than household incomes, resulting in a fall in real incomes. The UK cost of living is currently the most affected of advanced economies.

Private rents across all tenants in Scotland have risen significantly in recent months, with reports indicating that annual rents have increased by 15.1% in Edinburgh, 13.0% in Glasgow and 4.4% in Aberdeen. Announcing the legislation, First Minister of Scotland Nicola Sturgeon described pressures on household budgets as a humanitarian emergency.

== Purpose ==
The stated purpose of the Act is to respond to the situation caused by the impact of the cost crisis on those living in the rented sector in Scotland by introducing a rent freeze and a moratorium on evictions, along with increased damages for unlawful evictions. The stated intended effect is to protect tenants by stabilising their housing costs, to reduce impacts on the health and wellbeing of tenants caused by being evicted and/or made homeless by giving them more time to find accommodation, and to seek to avoid tenants being evicted from the rented sector by a landlord wanting to raise rents.

The Scottish Government holds that the emergency legislation is necessary in order to urgently respond to the specific circumstances of the current cost crisis to support those who rent their homes. Households living in the rental sectors have less ability than owner occupiers to respond to the cost crisis because their housing costs, relative to their incomes, tend to be higher.

The legislation has a reporting requirement in order to demonstrate regularly the need for provisions to continue based on evidence at the relevant time.

The Scottish Government expressed that significant increases are expected in fuel poverty rates, particularly in the private and social rented sectors, with around half of households in these sectors being in fuel poverty despite the Energy Price Guarantee and despite such forms of mitigation as grants and support payments.

== Reactions ==
Living Rent, the tenants' union in Scotland, expressed that it is inappropriate for tenants to be sheltering landlords from the cost of living crisis and that the Act provides some relief, while also noting that rents prior to the freeze were already unaffordable, thus necessitating maintaining the Act in force until the Scottish Government enacts rent controls which return rents to affordable levels.

The chief executive of the Scottish Association of Landlords John Blackwood suggested that the Act may reduce the supply of housing currently available.

The London Renters Union has called for similar changes to be enacted in England. Reports indicate that rent increases of up to 50% have been observed in London.
