= List of acts of the Scottish Parliament from 2022 =

This is a list of acts of the Scottish Parliament passed in 2022. Acts of the Scottish Parliament are enacted by the Scottish Parliament, which has legislative authority over devolved matters in relation to Scotland under the authority of the Scotland Act 1998. Acts are cited by calendar year, in the same fashion as acts of Parliament of the United Kingdom. Each act passed in a respective year is numbered consecutively with Arabic numerals, following the prefix "asp".

10 acts of the Scottish Parliament were passed in 2022.

indicates that an act has been transcribed on Wikisource, indicates that an act is available to view at legislation.gov.uk, and indicates the location of the original act in the Parliamentary Archives.

== Acts of the Scottish Parliament ==
Short title	Citation	Royal assent
Long title
Transvaginal Mesh Removal (Cost Reimbursement) (Scotland) Act 2022	2022 asp 1	3 March 2022
An Act of the Scottish Parliament to enable the Scottish Ministers to reimburse costs relating to the removal of transvaginal mesh.
Coronavirus (Discretionary Compensation for Self-isolation) (Scotland) Act 2022	2022 asp 2	23 March 2022
An Act of the Scottish Parliament to temporarily modify sections of the Public Health etc. (Scotland) Act 2008 (Note: Public Health etc. (Scotland) Act 2008 (asp 5)) which require health boards to pay compensation for self-isolation so that, where self-isolation is for a reason relating to coronavirus, health boards have discretion as to whether to pay compensation; and to provide for the expiry of a provision of the Coronavirus Act 2020 (Note: Coronavirus Act 2020 (c. 7)) which temporarily modified the same sections of the Public Health etc. (Scotland) Act 2008.
Budget (Scotland) Act 2022	2022 asp 3	23 March 2022
An Act of the Scottish Parliament to make provision, for financial year 2022/23, for the use of resources by the Scottish Administration and certain bodies whose expenditure is payable out of the Scottish Consolidated Fund, for the maximum amounts of borrowing by certain statutory bodies and for authorising the payment of sums out of the Fund; to make provision, for financial year 2023/24, for authorising the payment of sums out of the Fund on a temporary basis; and for connected purposes.
Scottish Local Government Elections (Candidacy Rights of Foreign Nationals) Act 2022	2022 asp 4	19 July 2022
An Act of the Scottish Parliament to give to certain foreign nationals the right to stand as candidates at local government elections in Scotland in accordance with international treaty agreements entered into by the United Kingdom.
Good Food Nation (Scotland) Act 2022	2022 asp 5	26 July 2022
An Act of the Scottish Parliament to require the Scottish Ministers to prepare and publish a national good food nation plan; to require certain authorities to prepare and publish their own good food nation plans; and to provide as to the effect of all of those plans.
Miners' Strike (Pardons) (Scotland) Act 2022	2022 asp 6	26 July 2022
An Act of the Scottish Parliament to pardon certain individuals convicted of certain offences committed during the 1984-85 miners' strike.
Non-Domestic Rates (Coronavirus) (Scotland) Act 2022	2022 asp 7	28 July 2022
An Act of the Scottish Parliament to make provision about the effect of coronavirus on the calculation of the net annual value and rateable value of lands and heritages for the purpose of non-domestic rates.
Coronavirus (Recovery and Reform) (Scotland) Act 2022	2022 asp 8	10 August 2022
An Act of the Scottish Parliament to make provision about public health protection powers; to make provision about educational establishments and school consultations; to make miscellaneous public service reforms; to modify the law on tenancies; to make temporary modifications to the law in relation to the justice system; and for connected purposes.
Fireworks and Pyrotechnic Articles (Scotland) Act 2022	2022 asp 9	10 August 2022
An Act of the Scottish Parliament to make provision for licensing the purchase, acquisition, possession and use of certain fireworks; to prevent the supply of certain fireworks and pyrotechnic articles to persons under the age of 18; to limit the supply and use of certain fireworks to particular periods; to provide for the creation of firework control zones; to make provision prohibiting possession of fireworks and pyrotechnic articles in certain circumstances; and for connected purposes.
Cost of Living (Tenant Protection) (Scotland) Act 2022	2022 asp 10	27 October 2022
An Act of the Scottish Parliament to make provision in connection with protecting residential tenants from increases in rent; protecting residential tenants from eviction; and for connected purposes.

== See also ==
- List of acts of the Scottish Parliament
