= London Renters Union =

Tenants' union in London

- Formation: 2018; 8 years ago
- Type: Tenants' union
- Location: London
- Website: Official site

The London Renters Union is a tenants' union in the United Kingdom founded in 2018. As of September 2024, the union represents over 7,000 members across London.

In the face of recession due to the COVID-19 pandemic, left-wing political group Momentum organised with tenants' unions such as the London Renters' Union, as well as ACORN, to educate renters about their tenancy rights and organise renters to fight evictions. Momentum began encouraging their supporters in to join the London Renters' Union in May 2020, and the campaign was in full swing by September.

Following the Scottish Parliament enacting the Cost of Living (Tenant Protection) (Scotland) Act 2022, the London Renters Union called for a similar law to be enacted in England. From 2024, the LRU has called for rent control laws to be enacted.

== See also ==
- Housing in the United Kingdom
- Living Rent
- ACORN the Union
- Greater Manchester Tenants Union
