= IBML =

American computer software company

Imaging Business Machines, LLC
- Company type: private
- Industry: Computer software
- Founded: August 1, 1992
- Headquarters: Irondale, Alabama, U.S., United States
- Key people: Martin Birch (CEO); G. Russell Smith (CFO); Pete Rudak (CTO)
- Products: Document imaging, production scanners, capture software, high speed image capture, data recognition
- Website: www.ibml.com

ibml (Imaging Business Machines, L.L.C.), founded in 1992, is a privately held information capture company headquartered in Irondale, Alabama, United States. Combining hardware and software products and services, ibml products provide end-to-end scanning and document capture.

== History and technology ==
Founded as a document scanning company on August 1, 1992, by Gary Murphy, ibml has grown into an information capture business that focuses on design, manufacture, delivery, and the support of high-speed document capture scanners and software. The ImageTrac scanner, a core product, was first shipped to Australian Airlines to read ticket numbers and capture color images of tickets for the airline revenue accounting process. It became the scanner of choice for the airline industry soon thereafter.

In 1997, ibml released SoftTrac software to manage ImageTrac scanners. The series continued to evolve; ImageTrac II was introduced in 2000, and ImageTrac III and ImageTrac IV were released in about 2003. In 2009, these scanners were selected for use by the 2010 United States census. 2010 saw the introduction of the ImageTrac Series 5000 platform. This was followed by the launch of SoftTrac Capture Suite software in 2011, the ImageTracDS line of products in 2012, SoftTrac Synergetics intelligent document recognition software in 2013, and the ImageTrac Series 6000 in 2014. In 2020, the company unveiled the FADGI 3-Star Certified ibmlFUSiON™ high-speed intelligent scanner.

In June 2007, the majority of ibml was purchased by the private equity firm Ares Management. A minority is owned by management. The board of directors consists of two individuals from Ares Management, one independent party, and ibml's CEO, Martin Birch.
