= Information capture =

Information capture is the process of collecting paper documents, forms and e-documents, transforming them into accurate, retrievable, digital information, and delivering the information into business applications and databases for immediate action.

== See also ==
- Ibml
