= Coronavirus (Recovery and Reform) (Scotland) Act 2022 =

Act of the Scottish Parliament

Coronavirus (Recovery and Reform) (Scotland) Act 2022 (Note: Section 60.)
- Act of the Scottish Parliament
- Scottish Parliament
- Long title: An Act of the Scottish Parliament to make provision about public health protection powers; to make provision about educational establishments and school consultations; to make miscellaneous public service reforms; to modify the law on tenancies; to make temporary modifications to the law in relation to the justice system; and for connected purposes.
- Citation: 2022 asp 8
- Territorial extent: Scotland

Dates
- Royal assent: 10 August 2022
- Commencement: various (Note: Section 59.)
Other legislation
Amends	Legal Aid (Scotland) Act 1986; Debtors (Scotland) Act 1987; Criminal Procedure (Scotland) Act 1995; Bankruptcy (Scotland) Act 2016
Amended by	Education (Scotland) Act 2025
Relates to	Coronavirus (Scotland) Act 2020

Status: Amended

Text of statute as originally enacted

Revised text of statute as amended

Text of the Coronavirus (Recovery and Reform) (Scotland) Act 2022 as in force today (including any amendments) within the United Kingdom, from legislation.gov.uk.

The Coronavirus (Recovery and Reform) (Scotland) Act 2022 (asp 8) is an act of the Scottish Parliament which extends emergency powers used during the COVID-19 pandemic, legislates for remote provision of legal and administrative services, and contains protections against eviction for housing tenants. It was criticised by opposition parties and academics as a power grab by the Scottish Government.

== Background ==
=== COVID-19 pandemic and lockdown measures ===
In early 2020, the global COVID-19 pandemic reached Scotland, necessitating lockdown measures, the implementation of which required new emergency powers defined in the Coronavirus (Scotland) Act 2020 covering devolved responsibilities of the Scottish Government, with reserved powers covered by the UK-wide Coronavirus Act 2020. The powers were time-limited, initially set to automatically lapse after 6 months, with the option to extend the measures limited to a further 12 months.

On 24 June 2021, the Scottish Parliament passed the Coronavirus (Extension and Expiry) (Scotland) Act 2021 which continued the emergency powers for another 6 months until March 2022, with an option to extend them until September of that year. John Swinney, the then-Deputy First Minister and Cabinet Secretary for Covid Recovery, described the legislation as "essential" due to the continued presence of COVID-19 in Scotland, which was surging at the time. The moving of the expiration date for the emergency powers was criticised by the Scottish Conservatives and the Scottish Liberal Democrats, with the shadow Covid Recovery Secretary Murdo Fraser expressing doubts about unnecessarily keeping "extraordinary and unprecedented powers" in light of progress on the COVID-19 vaccination programme. The new act was given royal assent on 4 August 2021.

=== Consultation and bill ===
On 17 August 2021, the Scottish Government published a consultation which proposed an indefinite extension to certain emergency powers, which Swinney explained as "keeping those [measures] where there is demonstrable benefit to the people of Scotland" while discarding those which are "no longer necessary".

The Coronavirus (Recovery and Reform) (Scotland) Bill was published on 25 January 2022. It was debated on 12 May 2022, when Swinney detailed proposed amendments to it including what he described as a "gateway vote mechanism" to improve the balance of power between the executive and parliament.

The Scottish Parliament passed the bill on 28 June 2022 and it received royal assent on 10 August.

== The act ==
In its original form, the bill included provisions to allow ministers to reintroduce lockdown procedures such as reverting schools to distance learning without parliamentary approval. This was later moderated to allow parliament to vote on ministerial uses of these powers. It also includes safeguards against eviction of housing tenants and the option for various legal and administrative services to be carried out remotely.

== Criticism ==
During the consultation, the proposed measures were denounced by the Conservatives with Murdo Fraser describing them as "a clear sign [the Scottish National Party] are unwilling to give up their control over people’s lives".

On publication, the bill was criticised by the Scottish Conservative and Labour parties as a "power grab" by the SNP, with the deputy leader of Scottish Labour Jackie Baillie adding that emergency powers are "not a free pass for ministers to hoard new powers" and that there is "no excuse for bypassing Parliament, when Holyrood has shown time and time again that it can respond with the urgency needed".

Prior to the stage one debate, the powers in the bill were compared to Henry VIII powers, with academic lawyers critical of the bill including Fiona de Londras from the University of Birmingham, who called the powers granted "extremely broad", and Andrew Tickell and Alison Britton of Glasgow Caledonian University, who described them as "infring[ing] upon the separation of powers". Alex Cole-Hamilton, the leader of the Scottish Liberal Democrats, called for the bill to be completely rejected, describing it as "a permanent transfer from Parliament to the executive, undermining democracy and civil liberties in the process". Fraser and Baillie similarly called for the bill to be scrapped. Siobhian Brown, a convener of the COVID-19 Recovery Committee, defended the bill, saying it was "imperative" to "have legislation in place that is suitably flexible and proportionate to support an effective response to future threats".

Upon the passage of the bill, the opposition reiterated their criticism of it, with Baillie calling it "Frankenstein-like" and "wholly unjustifiable", asserting that the amendments "simply don't go far enough".
