= Darryl Fears =

American journalist

- Education: Howard University
- Occupation: Journalist
- Awards: Pulitzer Prize for Explanatory Reporting

Darryl Fears is an American journalist, known for his work on race, climate, conservation, and environmental justice.

== Career ==
Fears was born in the Tampa Bay area and graduated from Howard University. Early in his career, Fears worked for the Los Angeles Times, the Detroit Free Press, and as the city hall bureau chief for The Atlanta-Journal Constitution.

Fears joined The Washington Post as a reporter in 1999 and was one of the recipients of the 2020 Pulitzer Prize for Explanatory Reporting for the 2°C: Beyond the Limit series, illustrating the impact of climate change using temperature data. He is a member of the National Association of Black Journalists and the Society of Environmental Journalists.
