= Bertha Lewis (activist) =

American activist

Bertha Lewis (born 1951) is the founder and president of the Black Institute, an 'action tank' whose mission is 'to shape intellectual discourse and dialogue and impact public policy uniquely from a Black perspective (a perspective which includes all people of color in the United States and throughout the Diaspora).' She was the CEO and Chief Organizer of the nonprofit social justice organization ACORN until it disbanded in 2010. In early 2014, she was a member of New York City Mayor Bill de Blasio's Transition Team.

Lewis attended Hanover College, in Hanover, Indiana from 1967 to 1968. She was appointed to lead ACORN in May 2008. In that position, Ms. Lewis oversaw the operations of its 400,000 strong membership, which was active in over 110 cities across the country. A 16-year veteran of the organization, Lewis was previously the executive director of ACORN's New York affiliate and is a founding co-chair of the New York Working Families Party.

She has opposed the plastic bag ban in New York City. Prior to voicing her opinion, she received payments from the American Progressive Bag Alliance, a lobbying group that represents U.S. plastic bag manufacturers.

== Awards and recognition ==
- 2004 Citizen Activist Award of the Gleitsman Foundation for her work in public education reform
- 2005 Leon Bogues award for community and political activism, by New York State Black and Puerto Rican Legislators, Inc.
- 2006 “Influentials” in politics by New York magazine
- 2007 100 Most Influential Women of New York, by Crains magazine
