= Association of Community Organizations for Reform Now =

Socio-economic community advocacy group

- Abbreviation: ACORN
- Formation: 1970; 56 years ago
- Type: Non-governmental organization
- Legal status: Active; defunct (US)
- Region served: United States; Peru; Argentina; Mexico; India; Canada; United Kingdom

The Association of Community Organizations for Reform Now (ACORN) is a community-based organization that advocates for low- and moderate-income families by working on neighborhood safety, voter registration, health care, affordable housing, and other social issues. They, along with a number of other community unions, are affiliated under ACORN International.

== Organization ==
In the US, ACORN was composed of a number of legally distinct nonprofit entities and affiliates, including a nationwide umbrella organization established as a 501(c)(4) that performed lobbying; local chapters established as 501(c)(3) nonpartisan charities; and the national nonprofit and nonstock organization, ACORN Housing Corporation. ACORN's priorities included: better housing and wages for the poor, more community development investment from banks and governments, better public schools, labor-oriented causes and social justice issues. ACORN pursued these goals through demonstrations, negotiation, lobbying for legislation, and voter participation.

Unlike in the US, ACORN groups in other countries have little organizational funding. Under the ACORN model, most members are volunteers. Employed union organizers come from those working in local ACORN campaigns rather than from existing organizations and are paid a low wage. The union works on local and national level campaigns.

== History ==
Founded in 1970 by Wade Rathke and Gary Delgado, at its peak ACORN had over 500,000 members and more than 1,200 neighborhood chapters in over 100 cities across the U.S. In 2002, ACORN International was created to aid the spread of ACORN's model to other countries. There are currently ACORN affiliates in Cameroon, Canada, Czech Republic, England, France, Honduras, India, Ireland, Italy, Kenya, Peru, Scotland, Tunisia, United States, and Wales.

ACORN suffered a damaging nationwide controversy in the fall of 2009 after James O'Keefe and Hannah Giles secretly made, edited and released videos of interactions with low-level ACORN personnel in several of their offices, leading to several investigations by state officials that concluded the videos were inaccurately portraying the personnel as encouraging criminal behavior. The organization didn't recover from the negative publicity in the US and dissolved in 2010, with ACORN members and organizers forming new organizations such as the Alliance of Californians for Community Empowerment (ACCE). ACORN groups outside of the US continued unaffected. ACORN, under ACORN International, still works within the US through its Home Savers Campaign, for example.

== Issues and actions ==
=== Predatory lending and affordable housing ===
ACORN investigated complaints against companies accused of predatory lending practices. ACORN also worked to support strict state laws against predatory practices, organized against foreclosure rescue scams, and steered borrowers toward loan counseling; Following a three-year campaign, Household International (now owned by HSBC Holdings and renamed HSBC Finance Corporation), one of the largest subprime lenders in the country, and ACORN announced on November 25, 2003, a proposed settlement of a 2002 national class-action lawsuit brought by ACORN. The settlement created a $72 million foreclosure avoidance program to provide relief to household borrowers who were at risk of losing their homes. The settlement came on the heels of an earlier $484 million settlement between Household International, Attorneys General, and bank regulators from all 50 U.S. states.

=== Voter registration ===
Since the 1980s, ACORN conducted large-scale voter registration drives, focusing primarily on registering poor and minority citizens.

=== Education ===
In 2001, ACORN opposed the privatization of some New York City schools, favoring its own Charter School plan.

=== Gun control ===
In 2006, ACORN intervened on behalf of Jersey City, New Jersey, in a lawsuit brought against the city challenging a local ordinance that limited individuals' handgun purchases to one gun a month. The Hudson County Superior Court struck down the ordinance on the grounds that it violated the New Jersey Constitution's Equal Protection clause, and a state statute prohibiting towns and municipalities from enacting firearms legislation. On September 29, 2008, the New Jersey Superior Court Appellate Division denied ACORN's appeal of the Hudson County Superior Court's decision striking down Jersey City's ordinance.

=== Home Defender Program ===
In 2009, ACORN advocated allowing homeowners delinquent in their mortgage payments to remain in their homes pending a government solution to the housing foreclosure crisis. ACORN introduced a program called the Home Defender Program, intended to mobilize people to congregate at homes faced with foreclosure to "defend a family's right to stay in their homes."

== Legal issues ==
In a 2007 case in Washington state, in which seven temporary employees of ACORN were charged with submitting fraudulent voter registrations, ACORN agreed to pay King County $25,000 for its investigative costs and acknowledged that the national organization could be subject to criminal prosecution if fraud occurred. In May 2009, six ACORN employees in Pittsburgh, Pennsylvania, pleaded guilty to charges of a combined total of 51 counts of forgery and other violations while registering voters during the 2008 election cycle.

During the 2008 election season, ACORN gathered over 1.3 million voter registration forms in 21 states. Project Vote estimated that 400,000 registrations collected by ACORN were ultimately rejected, the vast majority for being duplicate registrations submitted by citizens. Project Vote estimated that only a few percent of registrations were fraudulent, based on past years and samples from some drives in 2008. Project Vote estimated that 450,000 of the registrations collected by ACORN represented first-time voters, while the remainder were address changes submitted by citizens updating their addresses.

ACORN has fired employees for fraudulent registration practices and turned them over to authorities. Of 26,513 registrations submitted by ACORN over a nine-month period in San Diego County, California, 4,655 were initially flagged, but 2,806 of those were later validated. County officials said this resulted in a 7% error rate by ACORN, compared to usually less than 5% for voter drives by other organizations.

In plea deals in a 2009 Las Vegas case, former ACORN field director Amy Busefink and ACORN official Christopher Edwards pleaded guilty to "conspiracy to commit the crime of compensation for registration of voters," in connection with a quota system for paid registration staff. Edwards was sentenced to a year's probation and agreed to testify for prosecutors in charges against ACORN and against Busefink. Busefink appealed her case to the Nevada Supreme Court, challenging the constitutionality of the statute. In April 2011, ACORN entered a guilty plea to one count of felony compensation for registration of voters, for which they were fined $5,000, but did not concede that the law was constitutional.

In 2008, it was revealed that Dale Rathke, the brother of ACORN founder Wade Rathke, had embezzled nearly $1 million from the organization between 1999 and 2000.

== ACORN International ==
ACORN International was created in 2002 as an offshoot of ACORN USA to aid the spread of ACORN's model to other countries, including Argentina, Canada, Mexico, and Peru. The first ACORN branch in the UK opened in Bristol in 2014 by three people, two of whom were graduates of the Community Organisers programme.

Other groups are affiliated with ACORN International: for example, Living Rent in Scotland and Alliance Citoyenne in France.

ACORN Canada was founded in 2004 and has chapters across the country. The national organization has led campaigns for more affordable internet access, caps on grocery prices, caps on banking fees, and tenants issues.

== See also ==
- ACORN 2009 undercover videos controversy
- History of ACORN in the United States

== Bibliography ==
- Delgado, Gary (1986). Organizing the Movement: The Roots and Growth of ACORN. Philadelphia: Temple University Press. ISBN 0-87722-393-9. OCLC 12134922.
- Swarts, Heidi J. (2008). Organizing Urban America: Secular and Faith-based Progressive Movements. Minneapolis: University of Minnesota Press. ISBN 978-0-8166-4839-9.
- Atlas, John (2010). Seeds of Change: The Story of ACORN, America's Most Controversial Antipoverty Community Organizing Group. Nashville: Vanderbilt University Press. ISBN 978-0-8265-1705-0.
- Acorn and the Firestorm (2018). New York: First Run Features. A documentary film written and directed by Sam Pollard and Reuben Atlas.
