= Wade Rathke =

American labor activist

- Born: 1948; Wyoming
- Education: Williams College
- Occupation: Chief Organizer for ACORN International
- Known for: Founder of ACORN
- Partner: Beth Butler
- Website: WadeRathke.com

Stephen Wade Rathke (born 1948) is a community and labor activist who founded the Association of Community Organizations for Reform Now (ACORN) in 1970 and Service Employees International Union (SEIU) Local 100 in 1980 (now United Labor Unions Local 100). He was ACORN's chief organizer from its founding in 1970 until June 2, 2008, and continues to be chief organizer of ACORN International and United Labor Unions Local 100. He is the publisher and editor-in-chief of Social Policy, a quarterly magazine for scholars and activists. The magazine's publishing arm has published four of his books. He is also a radio station manager of KABF (Little Rock) and WAMF (New Orleans).

== Early life and education ==
Rathke was born in Laramie, Wyoming, to Edmann J. Rathke and Cornelia Ratliff Rathke. He and his younger brother Dale were raised in Colorado and New Orleans, Louisiana, where they attended local schools and graduated from Benjamin Franklin High School.

Rathke attended Williams College, a private liberal arts college in Williamstown, Massachusetts, from 1966 to 1971. While there, Wade organized draft resistance for Students for a Democratic Society (SDS) and later organized welfare recipients in Springfield and Boston, Massachusetts for the National Welfare Rights Organization (NWRO).

== ACORN ==
=== Founding ===
Rathke began his career as an organizer for the National Welfare Rights Organization (NWRO) in Springfield, Massachusetts. After working with the NWRO, he left for Little Rock, Arkansas to found a new organization designed to unite poor and working-class families around a common agenda. As founder and chief organizer of ACORN, Rathke first hired Gary Delgado, among many notable community and labor organizers over the years. They developed a replicable model of "forming membership organizations and developing leaders in low-income neighborhoods -- relying substantially on young middle-class staff working for subsistence wages."

This community organizing initiative in Arkansas eventually developed as the Association of Community Organizations for Reform Now (ACORN), the largest organization of lower income and working families in the United States, with almost 500,000 dues-paying families spread across about one-hundred staffed offices in American cities. The Institute for Social Justice has been developed to serve as ACORN's training arm.

=== Departure ===
The New York Times reported on July 9, 2008, that Dale Rathke, the brother of ACORN's founder Wade Rathke, was found to have embezzled $948,607.50 from the group and affiliated charitable organizations in 1999 and 2000. Wade learned of the problem when an employee of Citizens Consulting, the accounting firm for ACORN, told him an investigation uncovered inappropriate charges that led to his brother. "Clearly, this was an uncomfortable, conflicting and humiliating situation as far as my family and I were concerned," Wade said, "and so the real decisions on how to handle it had to be made by others." ACORN executives decided to handle it as an internal matter, and did not inform some of the board members, staff or law enforcement. They signed an enforceable restitution agreement with the Rathke family to repay the amount of the embezzlement. After the Rathke family had repaid $210,000, in $30,000 installments, a friend of Wade Rathke, Drummond Pike, purchased the promissory note thereby repaying the remaining debt for Dale Rathke. According to the Times, Wade Rathke "said the decision to keep the matter secret was not made to protect his brother but because word of the embezzlement would have put a 'weapon' into the hands of enemies of Acorn, a liberal group that is a frequent target of conservatives who object to ACORN's often strident advocacy on behalf of low- and moderate-income families and workers." A whistleblower revealed the embezzlement in 2008. On June 2, 2008, Dale Rathke was dismissed, and Wade resigned that same day as ACORN's chief organizer. He continues as chief organizer for ACORN International, Inc.

== SEIU Local 100 ==
Rathke is also founder and Chief Organizer of Service Employees International Union (SEIU) Local 100, which is headquartered in New Orleans and also has chapters in Texas and Arkansas. Founded in 1980 in New Orleans as an independent union of Hyatt employees, the union became part of SEIU in 1984. SEIU Local 100 organizes public sector public workers, including school employees, Head Start, and health care workers, as well as lower-wage private sector workers in the hospitality, janitorial, and other service industries.

Rathke's work in the labor movement includes three terms as Secretary-Treasurer of the Greater New Orleans AFL-CIO. Rathke was the president and co-founder of the SEIU Southern Conference; a member of the International Executive Board of SEIU (1996–2004); and Chief Organizer of the Hotel and Restaurant Organizing Committee (HOTROC) a multi-union organizing project for hospitality workers in New Orleans sponsored by the AFL-CIO and its president, John Sweeney, and from 2004–2008 chief organizer of a multi-pronged effort to organize Walmart workers, including the Walmart workers in Florida and California. In 2009, Local 100 left SEIU and once again became United Labor Unions Local 100.

Rathke and Local 100 were most prominently in the news in the fall of 2017 when they filed charges with the NLRB to prevent Dallas Cowboys’ owner and general manager, Jerry Jones, from threatening his players if they refused to stand for the national anthem. The union withdrew its charge after the NFL said it would not discipline players and Jones.

== Other projects ==
In 2000, Rathke created the Organizers' Forum, which brings together senior organizers in labor and community organizations in dialogues about challenges faced by constituency-based organizations, such as tactical development, organizing new immigrants, using technology, using capital strategies and corporate campaign techniques, or understanding the effects and organizing challenges of globalization.

== Radio ==
Since 2013, Rathke has returned to the 100,000-watt radio station KABF-FM 88.3 as its station manager.

== Documentary ==
In 2017, the documentary film about Rathke titled The Organizer was released. It was directed by Nick Taylor and distributed by Grasshopper Film.

== Publications ==
- Citizen Wealth: Winning the Campaign to Save Working Families (2009)
- The Battle for the Ninth Ward: ACORN, Rebuilding New Orleans, and the Lessons of Disaster (2011)
- Edited Global Grassroots: Perspectives on International Organizing (2011)
- Nuts and Bolts: The ACORN Fundamentals of Organizing (2018)
