= Alliance Citoyenne =

French community organization

- Formation: 2012
- Region served: France
- Members: 11,587 (2025)
- Affiliations: ACORN International
- Website: https://alliancecitoyenne.org

Alliance Citoyenne (lit. 'Citizens' Alliance') is a working-class community organisation in France that advocates for "citizen unionism" inspired by the trade union model. The organisation is an affiliate of ACORN International.

== History ==
=== Experimentation (2010-2012) ===
In August 2010, the Espace des Communautés et Habitants Organisés (lit. 'Communities' and Organized Residents' Space', ECHO) association was established in Grenoble with the intent of bringing methods of community organizing and citizen empowerment by non-violent direct action into France. Among their seven founding members were David Gabriel, Solène Compingt and Adrien Roux.

Compingt, Roux and Gabriel served as community organizers, building networks of residents to challenge those responsible for injustice. ECHO formed an all-terrain tenants' union for people living in working-class neighbourhoods, including cleaning women, parents of students and those living in low-income housing.

After two years of organizing, non-violent actions and small victories, such as improved schedules for cleaning women, a new reception desk for foreign students and the reconstruction of a school in Villeneuve, five founding members left the project, while Compingt and Roux continued their efforts. On 4 December 2012, an assembly of 280 people met at Le Prisme à Seyssins, which officially established Alliance citoyenne in the Grenoble urban area.

=== Development elsewhere in France ===
Alliance citoyenne has established offshoots in other cities.

==== Si On s'Allait, Rennes (2014) ====
The first offshoot outside of Grenoble was established in Rennes in early 2014. Si On s'Allait (lit. 'If we ally') was primarily led by Claire St Sernin, who studied at the Grenoble Institute of Political Studies with Roux. Their first tenants' unions emerged in May 2015 when tenants living in the Villejean neighbourhood lead an action that involved putting photos of mold growing in their units on display in front of public housing owned by the company Neotoa.

==== Seine-Saint-Denis (2016) ====
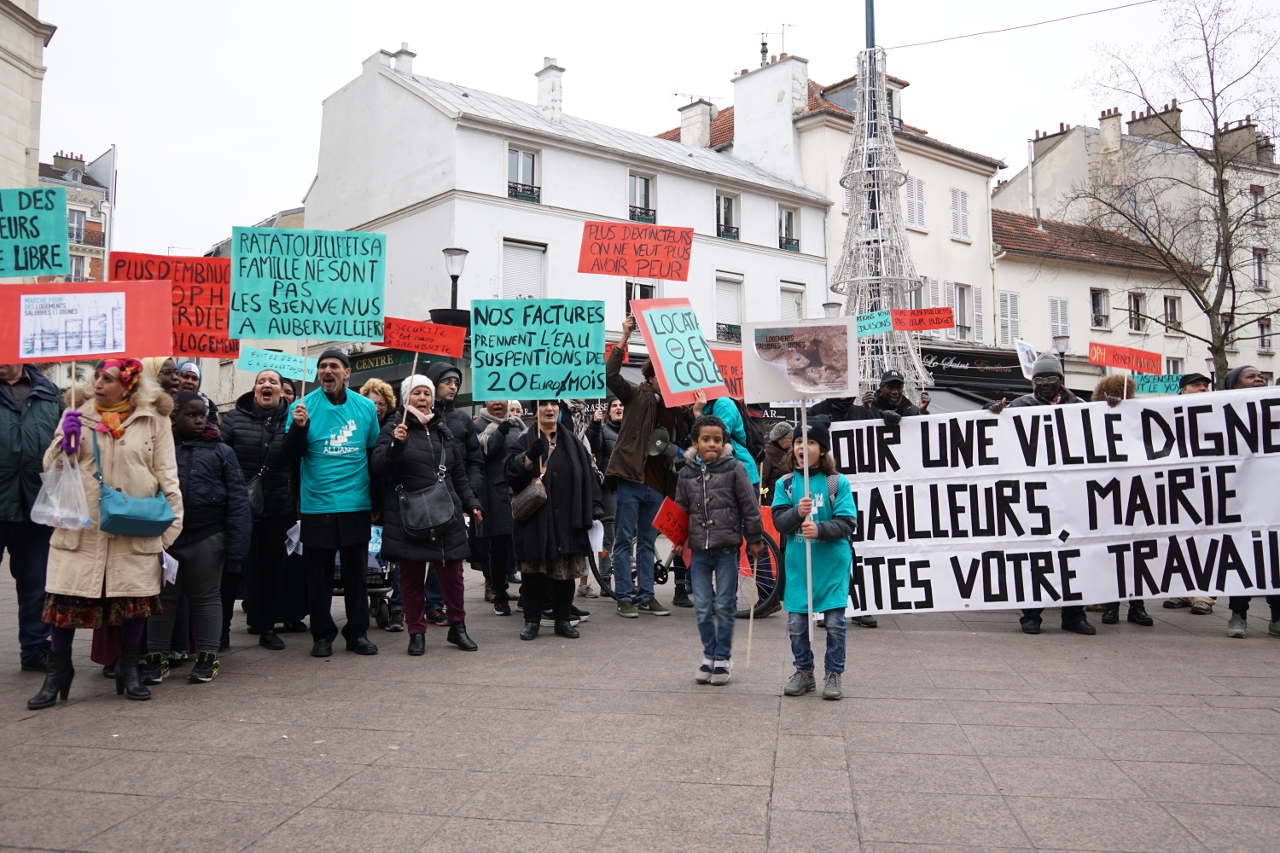
Alliance citoyenne families march in Aubervilliers against poor living conditions.

In 2016, an Alliance citoyenne offshoot was established in Aubervilliers by Simon Cottin Marx and Leïla Chaibi. Following a three-month-long training course in Grenoble from September to December 2015, three apprentice organizers (Adeline de Lépinay, Elias Showk, and Yves Jouffe) started tenants' unions in Vallès la Frette and Maladrerie. Their first successful challenge saw tenants reimbursed for high charges issued by their housing projects. Alliance citoyenne also mobilized Vallès la Frette residents against abusive police behaviour during an action where residents placed tickets on police cars.

In December 2020, a new tenant union was established in Saint-Ouen-sur-Seine, transforming the Aubervilliers offshoot of Alliance citoyenne into Alliance citoyenne de Seine-Saint-Denis.

==== Grand Lyon (2019) ====
In April 2019, Alliance citoyenne established an offshoot in the Metropolis of Lyon when members worked with a group of Muslim women who were protesting municipal regulations that forbade them from wearing burkinis in municipal pools. In 2020, the establishment of a tenants' union in the neighbourhood of Monod à Villeurbanne was followed by a campaign of social housing tenants demanding city hall and their landlords make renovations to their homes' heating systems.
