= 1970–1973 Republic of Ireland rent strikes =

Housing protests in Ireland

- Date: 1970 - August 1973
- Location: Republic of Ireland
- Caused by: Rent hikes; lack of services in housing estates
- Goals: Rent reductions; Easier tenant purchase of public housing
- Methods: Rent strike
- Result: Tenant victory

Parties
National Association of Tenants Organisations	(Republic of Ireland) Government of Ireland

Number
Over 35,000 households	

From 1970 through to 1973, social housing tenants in the Republic of Ireland were on a rent strike.

The action began as a series of smaller local rent strikes. In 1972, the National Association of Tenants Organisations officially called for a national rent strike across all of the Republic of Ireland. The rent strike largely ended in August 1973 after the government conceded.

== Background ==
B-scale rent system of the Housing Act 1966 resulted in increased rent burden on tenants living in social housing. Additionally, a lack of services in social housing estates, and desire for greater control over the estates by the tenants added further difficulties.

In 1967, the National Association of Tenants Organisations (NATO) was founded as an umbrella of local tenants' organisations. The organisation positioned itself as nonpartisan, primarily to prevent co-option by Fianna Fáil.

== Strike action ==
Grievances culminated in March 1970 when rent strikes broke out Ballyphehane, Cork, and Ballymun, Dublin. In late 1972 the National Association of Tenants Organisations called for an all-out national rent strike. At the peak of the strike, 35,000 households were participating, totalling 350,000 people.

Following the 1973 Irish general election, the NATO successfully negotiated with the Fine Gael-Labour coalition government an end to the strike and achieved rent reductions, better terms for tenant purchase of social housing, and for official recognition of the NATO in representing social tenants.

Despite this, strike action in Cork partially continued under the Joint Cork Corporation Tenants Council.

== Relationship with other political forces ==
Tensions existed between the NATO and trade unions leadership despite support from trade union membership. Trade union members would often mobilise to support striking tenants in resisting eviction attempts. There were also tensions with the Irish Women's Liberation Movement.

Labour Party had a complex relationship with the rent strike, with Labour councillors often adopting positions that conflicted with one and other. Rent strike action was supported by parties further left, with such parties participating in the rent strike to an extent. One member of the NATO's executive was also a member of Official Sinn Féin although the strike received only limited coverage in the Official Sinn Féin's newspaper. The Communist Party of Ireland reported frequently on the strike in its newspaper, and one Communist Party figure chaired the Ballyfermot Community Association – one of the largest NATO affiliates. There was some hesitance, even by those with partisan affiliations, to have these parties be too involved. Regardless of partisan affiliation of the individuals involved in strike action, participants were deeply invested in the movement.

== Legacy ==
In 2019, the tenants' union Community Action Tenants Union was established with organisers partially inspired by the NATO and the rent strike of the early 1970s. CATU has shown interest in researching the 70s rent strike, and prior to CATU-assisted research into the rent strike, very little literature or records existed on the rent strike. In 2024, a documentary film covering the events titled Rent Strike was produced by the Upstate Theatre Project with assistance from CATU.

== See also ==
- Anti-internment rent and rates strike
- Dublin Housing Action Committee
- Derry Housing Action Committee

== Works cited ==
- Tubridy, Fiadh (May 2024). "Militant Research in the Housing Movement: The Community Action Tenants Union Rent Strike History Project". Antipode. 56 (3): 1027–1046. Bibcode:2024Antip..56.1027T. doi:10.1111/anti.13014. ISSN 0066-4812.
- Tubridy, Fiadh; Bohan, John (28 October 2024). "The party in the flats: Relationships between housing movements and the political party form in the 1970s Irish rent strikes". Radical Housing Journal. 6 (2): 55–73. doi:10.54825/ESFP3948.
