= Living Rent =

Scottish tenants' union

- Abbreviation: LR
- Predecessor: Edinburgh Private Tenants Action Group
- Formation: 2014
- Type: Tenants' union
- Headquarters: Edinburgh, Scotland
- Region served: Scotland
- Members: 1,200 (2020)
- Affiliations: ACORN International; International Union of Tenants
- Staff: 9 (2021)
- Website: livingrent.org

Living Rent is a national tenants' union in Scotland. Originally established in 2014 as a campaign group urging the Scottish Government to implement rent controls, it subsequently became a mass membership organisation of tenants aiming to "tackle the power imbalance between landlords and tenants" through collective action.

Living Rent is affiliated to ACORN International and is an associate member of the International Union of Tenants (IUT).

== Structure ==
Living Rent is a democratic, members-led organisation. Members are organised in branches, typically at a neighbourhood level, each of which has a committee elected by local members. There are multiple branches across Glasgow and Edinburgh, as well as branches in Aberdeen, Dundee, Inverness, and Paisley. Branches work together on national campaigns through the national forum.

A national committee elected by members at its AGM is legally responsible for the organisation and its good governance.

== History ==
=== Campaign group ===
Living Rent was established in 2014 in response to the announcement of a series of Scottish Government consultations on housing and tenancy reform. The campaign organisation was established by the Edinburgh Private Tenants Action Group, alongside activists from ACORN Scotland and the National Union of Students. Living Rent's three key demands were for rent controls, the abolition of no-fault evictions and greater flexibility for tenants to end leases early. The consultation received over 2,500 responses, with just under 2,000 of them having been organised by Living Rent accounting for three-quarters of all responses.

By 2015, Living Rent had established a national board, links to other organisations and trade unions, and local groups across Scotland. That year, the Sturgeon Government amended their plans for housing and tenancy reform, and launched their second consultation. The second consultation received three times as many responses as the first one. As a result of Living Rents' campaigning, the government amended proposals once more, and passed the Private Housing (Tenancies) (Scotland) Act 2016, which banned some no-fault evictions.

=== Tenants union ===
In 2016, Living Rent turned from a campaign group into a mass-membership tenants' union. In October that year, Living Rent held its first AGM as a tenants' union, reporting a membership of over 100, as well as 2,600 associate members and support from Unite the Union, Unison and the National Union of Students. By its second AGM in January 2018, its membership had doubled to over 200, allowing Living Rent to hire full-time staff to support its work in Glasgow and Edinburgh. The union's membership subsequently grew to over 500 by the 2019 AGM and over 1,200 by the 2020 AGM, with over 300 people joining during the height of the COVID-19 pandemic.

In August 2021, Scottish Green Party co-leader Patrick Harvie credited Living Rent with having "created the political space" for rent control proposals in the SNP-Green co-operation agreement, through which he became Minister for Zero Carbon Buildings, Active Travel and Tenants’ Rights later that month.

== See also ==
- Housing in the United Kingdom
- Rent control in Scotland
- London Renters Union
- Greater Manchester Tenants Union
- Cost of Living (Tenant Protection) (Scotland) Act 2022
