= National Association of Tenants Organisations =

NATO
- National Association of Tenants Organisations

The National Association of Tenants Organisations (NATO) was an Irish Tenants union. Established in 1967, it became most prominent with its leading role in the 1970–1973 Republic of Ireland rent strikes.

== History ==
NATO was established in 1967 as an umbrella organization, representing individual tenants organisations nationwide.

== See also ==
- Community Action Tenants Union - Modern form of a National Irish Tenants Union.
