= ACORN International =

Federation of organizations

Logo of ACORN International

ACORN International is a federation of autonomous member-based community organizations and tenants unions. The organisations represent a total global membership of approximately 250,000 members.

ACORN International has active affiliated organisations in multiple countries, such as Cameroon, Canada, the Czech Republic, England, France, Honduras, India, Ireland, Italy, Kenya, Peru, Scotland, Tunisia, the United States, and Wales.

== History ==
Acorn International was created in 2004 by members and staff of the Association of Community Organizations for Reform Now (ACORN). The Founder and Chief Organizer is Wade Rathke. The headquarters of ACORN International are in New Orleans and Toronto. Much of the capacity outside of the organizing areas is provided by interns and volunteers that have come from George Brown College (Toronto), Carleton University (Ottawa), York University (Toronto), Georgia State University, the University of Edinburgh (Scotland), and many others.

== Campaigns ==
Since its creation it has focused on a wide variety of local campaigns and initiatives, including fighting for potable water, paved roads, schools and parks in San Juan Laragancho in Lima, Peru, working to organize ragpickers and hawkers in India's mega-slums, and working to raise the standards for tenants in cities across Canada. Much of ACORN International's work in Latin America, Africa and India focuses on mega-slums like Dharavi (Mumbai), San Juan Laragancho (Lima), La Matanza (Buenos Aires), Korogocho (Nairobi), the ITO community (Delhi), Col. Ramon Amalia Amador (Tegucigalpa), and Choloma (San Pedro Sula) among others.

ACORN International's major projects have included the Commonwealth Games campaign. and the Remittance Justice campaign.

== Research ==
ACORN International conducts research on topics relevant to its members' campaigns. Recent topics have included rural electrical cooperative governance, voter purges, and hospital accessibility and accountability. Research is conducted in partnership with the Labor Neighbor Research and Training Center and United Labor Unions.

Previously, the organization researched the interest rates, transparency, and role (if any) of micro-finance in poverty reduction. A white paper, along the lines of those developed for the Remittance Justice Campaign, entitled "Mega Troubles for Micro-Finance" was released in the summer of 2011 demanding among other things that no additional donor or government money be invested in micro-finance since it has failed to reduce poverty according to both ACORN International's research and research done by the Abdul Latif Jameel Poverty Action Lab. Responses received from a number of international development agencies such as the World Bank and UK AID have been in agreement with many of the criticisms of microfinance industries included in the report, but do not agree with the report's final recommendations of eliminating all public funding of microfinance among other suggestions.

== In the United Kingdom and Ireland ==
The first ACORN branch in the UK opened in Bristol in 2014 by three people – all three of whom had experience organising the Bristol Industrial Workers of the World, two of them also graduates of the Community Organisers programme. Part of the funding to establish ACORN in the UK came from the Big Society initiative. Initially ACORN was not set up to focus much on housing issues, with this focus developing as repeated concerns regarding housing were raised.

Since 2014, Acorn groups in the United Kingdom have been established in Brighton, Weston-super-Mare, Ceredigion, Birmingham, Liverpool, Manchester, Sheffield, Leeds and Newcastle. The group has been described as being akin to trade union for tenants, as a trade union but with community membership, and as a renters' union.

Following the victory of the Conservative Party in the 2019 UK general election, ACORN England received a surge in membership applications. In the face of recession due to the COVID-19 pandemic, the British left-wing political group Momentum organised with tenants' organisations such as ACORN, as well as the London Renters Union, to educate renters about their tenancy rights and organise renters to fight evictions. Momentum began encouraging their supporters in to join up direct action efforts with such organisations in May 2020, and the campaign was in full swing by September. As of 2020, ACORN Bristol had 600 members.

The Scottish tenants' union Living Rent, and the Irish tenants' union CATU Ireland, are both affiliates of ACORN International.

== In Canada ==
ACORN Canada was founded in 2004 and has chapters across the country. The national organization has led campaigns for more affordable internet access, caps on grocery prices, caps on banking fees, and tenants issues.

== In France ==
Alliance Citoyenne is a working-class community organisation in France that advocates for "citizen unionism" inspired by the trade union model. The organisation was founded on 4 December 2012 in Grenoble, and is an affiliate of ACORN International.

== See also ==
- International Union of Tenants
- Slum Dwellers International
