= Derry Housing Action Committee =

The Derry Housing Action Committee (DHAC), was an organisation formed in 1968 in Derry, Northern Ireland to protest about housing conditions and provision.

The DHAC was formed in February 1968 by two socialists and four tenants in response to the plight of the homeless and those tenants in the city who suffered under "Rachmanite" landlords. Named after the Dublin Housing Action Committee, the DHAC's initial actions (March 1968) involved disrupting meetings of the Unionist-dominated Londonderry Corporation to protest at the lack of housing provision in the city.

The Derry Housing Action Committee and its sister organisation Derry Unemployed Action Committee had many members and supporters from the James Connolly Republican Club, trade unionists and labour party members, amongst its activists were Eamonn Melaugh, Eamonn McCann, Fionnbarra Ó Dochartaigh (Finbar O'Doherty), J.J. O’Hara (brother of hunger striker Patsy O'Hara), Labour activist Gerry Mallet amongst others.

In May 1968 DHAC held another protest at the Guildhall, Derry and on 22 June staged a protest by blocking the Lecky Road in the Bogside area. After June 1968, when a caravan housing a family of four was dragged along a major road until the family was rehoused, the DHAC's actions became more militant and houses were squatted. On 3 July 1968, as part of a series of protests against housing conditions in Derry, DHAC held a sit-down protest on the newly opened second deck of the Craigavon Bridge in the city. Neil O’Donnell and Roddy O’Carlin were jailed for a month for refusal to keep the peace. On 27 August 1968, DHAC organised another protest in the Guildhall's council chamber. Immediately afterwards Eamonn Melaugh telephoned the Northern Ireland Civil Rights Association (NICRA) and invited them to organise a march in Derry.

Together with NICRA, they organised the 5 October 1968 civil rights demonstration in Derry, whose banning and violent suppression by the Royal Ulster Constabulary (RUC) was one of the major preludes to the Troubles.
