= Fred Ross =

Fred Ross may refer to:

- Fred Ross (community organizer)
- Fred Ross (American football)
- Fred Ross (artist)
- Fred Ross Jr. (1947–2022), labor and political organizer in California

== See also ==
- Frederick Ross (disambiguation)
