= Timeline of World War II (1942) =

List of significant events occurring during World War II in 1942

1942 in the Second World War

← 1941 1943 →
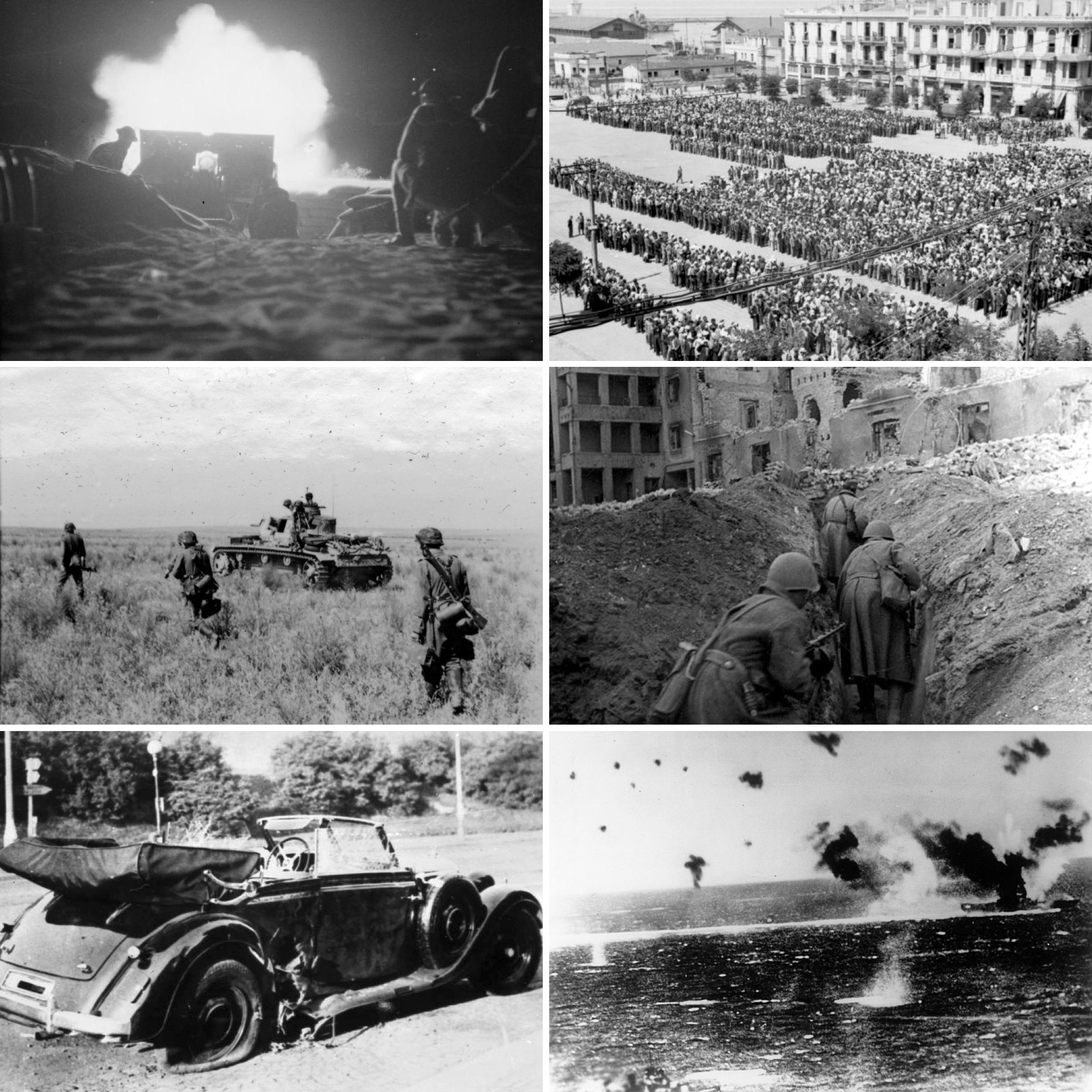
- 1942, clockwise from top left: British artillery barrage opens the Battle of El Alamein; the Jews of Salonika are rounded up for deportation to extermination camps; Soviet troops of the Great Patriotic War fight the Battle of Stalingrad; USS Lexington (CV-2) under fire at the Battle of the Coral Sea; Reinhard Heydrich's car after attack by Czech resistance; 5th SS Panzer Division Wiking troops work on the Case Blue plan to supply the Axis Powers with needed petroleum supplies
Location	Global

Belligerents
Allies: Soviet Union; United States; Philippines (surrendered); Philippines (exiled government); United Kingdom; India; New Zealand; Iraq; Burma; China; Nationalists; Communists; Free France; Poland; Czechoslovakia; South Africa; Canada; Australia; Norway; Luxembourg; Netherlands; Dutch East Indies; Belgium; Greece; Yugoslavia; Ethiopia; Mexico; Brazil	Axis: Germany; General Government; Serbia; Vichy France; Japan; Italy; Libya; Albania; Hungary; Romania; Bulgaria; Thailand; Slovakia; Croatia; Manchukuo; Co-belligerents; Finland

This is a timeline of events that occurred during World War II in 1942.

== January ==
1: Twenty-six Allied countries signed the Declaration by United Nations during the Arcadia Conference.

2: Manila is captured by Japanese forces. They also take Cavite naval base, and the American and Filipino troops continue the retreat into Bataan.

5: The beginning of a major Red Army offensive under General Zhukov.

6: The British advance continues to El Agheila, on the western edge of Libya.

In his State of the Union speech, President Roosevelt promises more aid to Britain, including planes and troops.

7: The Soviet Winter counter-offensive comes to a halt, after having pushed the exhausted and freezing German Army back 62–155 mi from Moscow. 'Operation Barbarossa' had failed.

Siege of the Bataan Peninsula begins.

Heavy air attacks on Malta; it is estimated that the bomb tonnage dropped on the island is twice that dropped on London.

8: Japanese troops penetrated the outer lines of defense at Kuala Lumpur, Malaya.

9: Japanese advances in Borneo met with little opposition.

10: Japan declares war on the Netherlands.

11: Japanese troops capture Kuala Lumpur, Malaya.

USS Saratoga is torpedoed by the Japanese submarine I-6 480 miles southwest of Pearl Harbor

Japan invades the Dutch East Indies.

13: The Red Army takes Kirov and Medya, as its counter-offensive continues.

The German U-boat offensive comes closer to the US shores starting the Second Happy Time.

Allied governments-in-exile in London issue a declaration entitled Punishment for War Crimes demanding post-war legal retribution for atrocities in German-occupied Europe.

15: German authorities begin to deport Jews from the Lodz ghettos to the Chelmno Concentration Camp.

19: Japanese forces take large numbers of British troops prisoner, north of Singapore.

20: Nazis at the Wannsee Conference in Berlin decide that the "Final Solution to the Jewish problem" is relocation, and later extermination.

Japanese bomb Singapore as their troops approach the city.

21: Rommel's Afrika Korps begins a surprise counter-offensive at El Agheila; his troops, with new reinforcements and tanks, capture Agedabia, then push north to Beda Fomm.
: At the Vilna Ghetto the Fareynikte Partizaner Organizatsye a Jewish partisan organisation is established, including Aba Kovner.

23: The Battle of Rabaul, on New Britain begins.

24: American troops land in Samoa, as part of a strategy to stop the Japanese advance in the Pacific.

25: Thailand declares war on the United States and United Kingdom.

Japanese troops invade the Solomon Islands.

26: The first American forces arrive in Europe landing in Northern Ireland.

27: The British withdraw all troops back into Singapore.

28: Brazil breaks off relations with the Axis powers.

29: Rommel's Afrika Korps recaptures Benghazi, Libya in his drive east. For the next few months, the two sides will rest and rearm.

30: Hitler speaks at the Berlin Sportpalast and threatens the Jews of the world with annihilation; he also blames the failure of the offensive in The Soviet Union on the weather.

31: The Japanese take the port of Moulamein, Burma; they now threaten Rangoon as well as Singapore.

On the Eastern front, the Germans are in retreat at several points.

The last organised Allied forces leave Malaya, ending the 54-day battle.

== February ==
1: Vidkun Quisling becomes the Nazi-aligned Minister-President of Norway

Rommel's forces reach El Gazala, Libya, near the border with Egypt; during a "Winter lull" he will remain there.

The United States Navy conducts the Marshalls-Gilberts raids attacking Jaluit, Mili, and Makin (Butaritari) islands as well as Kwajalein, Wotje, and Taroa.

United States automobile industry stops production and switches over the coming 12 months to producing war materials

2: General Joseph ("Vinegar Joe") Stilwell is named Chief of Staff to Chiang Kai-shek and Commander-in-Chief of the Allied forces in China.

3: Japanese air power conducts airstrikes against Java, especially the naval base at Surabaya.

Port Moresby, New Guinea is bombed by the Japanese, increasing the threat to Australia posed by Japan.

7: Americans continue their defence of Bataan against General Homma's troops.

9: British troops are now in full retreat into Singapore for a final defence.

Top United States military leaders hold their first formal meeting to discuss American military strategy in the war.

10: The cruise liner SS Normandie catches fire and capsizes in New York harbour. Although the cause is probably a welder's torch, various conspiracies are imagined in the media.

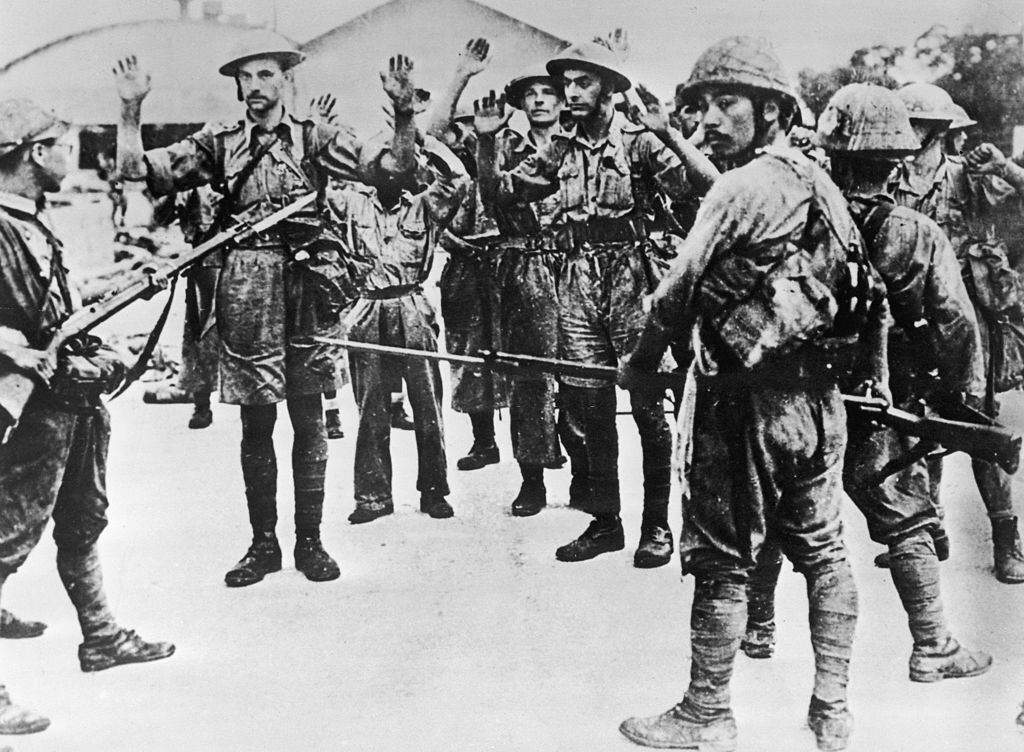
British soldiers captured by the Japanese after the Fall of Singapore on 15 February 1942

11: The "Channel Dash" – The German battleships Scharnhorst and Gneisenau, with the heavy cruiser Prinz Eugen, rush out of Brest through the English Channel to northern ports, including Wilhelmshaven, Germany; the British naval units fail to sink any of them.

13: The battle for Bataan continues, Battle of Pasir Panjang is fought (13-14/02), Commonwealth forces lost the strategic ridge.

15: Singapore surrendered to Japanese forces; this is arguably the most devastating loss in British military history.

16: Being discussed in high American government circles are plans for the internment of Japanese-Americans living generally in the western US.

The Japanese commit the Banka Island Massacre in which they open fire on Australian military nurses, killing 21.

17: Orders are given for Rangoon to be evacuated as Japanese forces approach.

19: Japanese aircraft attack Darwin, in Australia's Northern Territory.

President Franklin D. Roosevelt signs Executive Order 9066 allowing the United States military to define areas as exclusionary zones. These zones affect the Japanese on the West Coast, and Germans and Italians primarily on the East Coast.

A military conscription law is passed in Canada.

20: Japanese troops cross the important Salween River in Burma.

Japanese invade Bali and Timor by a combined use of paratroops and amphibious troops.

21: The American Air Corps is now firmly established at bases in the UK.

22: President Franklin Delano Roosevelt orders General Douglas MacArthur to evacuate the Philippines as American defense of the nation collapses.

25: The internment of Japanese-American citizens in the Western United States begins as fears of invasion increase.

Princess Elizabeth registers for war service.

26: Vivian Bullwinkel, the only survivor of the Banka Island Massacre, is captured and imprisoned by the Japanese.

27: Battle of the Java Sea – Under a Dutch Rear Admiral Karl Doorman, the combined forces lose 2 light cruisers and 3 destroyers.

USS Langley is attacked by nine Japanese Betty bombers in the Java Sea, damaged and later scuttled to prevent capture.

28: Japanese land forces invade Java.

== March ==
1: A Red Army offensive in the Crimea begins; in the north, the siege of Leningrad continues.

3: Japanese aircraft make a surprising raid on the airfield and harbor at Broome, Western Australia.

4: Japanese naval Operation K occurs, intended as a reconnaissance of Pearl Harbor and disruption of repair and salvage operations.

5: The Japanese capture Batavia, the capital of the Dutch East Indies.

New conscription laws in the United Kingdom include women and men up to the age of 45.

6: Malta receives more fighters for its on-going defence.

8: The Japanese land at Lae and Salamaua, on Huon Bay, New Guinea, beginning their move toward Port Moresby, New Guinea, and then Australia.

9: Japanese troops entered Rangoon, Burma, which was abandoned by the British two days earlier. It appears that the Japanese are in control of Java, Burma, and New Guinea.

The Secretary of War reorganizes the General Headquarters (GHQ), United States Army into three major commands – Army Ground Forces, Army Air Forces, and Services of Supply, the latter of which is later redesignated Army Service Forces. At the same time, the four Defense commands and all Theaters Of Operations (TOPNS) are subordinated to the War Department General Staff.

11: The Japanese land on Mindanao, the southernmost island in the Philippines.

12: American troops begin to land in Nouméa, New Caledonia; it will become an important staging base for the eventual invasion of Guadalcanal.

13: RAF launches an air raid against Essen, Germany.

14: Japanese land troops in the Solomon Islands, underscoring Australia's dangerous situation, especially if, as it is soon made clear, an airfield is built on Guadalcanal.

The Japanese are now threatening American forces around Manila Bay; the retreat to Corregidor begins.

17: U.S. General Douglas MacArthur arrives in Australia, after leaving his headquarters in the Philippines.

The United Kingdom institutes rationing of electricity, coal, and gas; the clothing ration is decreased as well.

20: Operation Outward begins, a program to attack Germany by means of free-flying balloons.

22: A fractured convoy reaches Malta, after heavy losses to the Luftwaffe and an Italian sea force. Continued heavy bombing attacks on the island with slight opposition from overtaxed RAF air forces.

25: RAF sends bomber raids against targets in France and Germany.

26: Jews in Berlin must now clearly identify their houses.

28: The RAF sends a raid against Lübeck, destroying over 30% of the city, and 80% of the medieval centre. Hitler is outraged.

British commandos launch Operation Chariot, a raid on the port at Saint Nazaire, France. HMS Campbeltown, filled with explosives on a time-delay fuse, rams the dock gates and commandos destroy other parts of the naval service area. The port is completely destroyed and does not resume service till 1947; however, around two-thirds of the raiding forces are lost.

== April ==
1: The Eastern Sea Frontier, desperately short on suitable escort vessels after the Destroyers for Bases Agreement, institutes an interim arrangement known as the "Bucket Brigaid," wherein vessels outside of protected harbors are placed in anchorages protected by netting after dark, and move only under whatever escort is available during the day. As word of this and similar measures reaches Dönitz, he does not wait to test their effectiveness, but instead shifts his U-boats to the area controlled by the Gulf Sea Frontier, where American anti-submarine measures are not as effective. As a result, in May more ships will be sunk in the Gulf, many of them off the Passes of the Mississippi, than off of the entire Eastern Seaboard.

The Pacific War Council meets for the first time in Washington. Intended to allow the smaller powers involved in fighting the Japanese to have some input into US decisions, its purpose is soon outstripped by events, notably the collapse of the ABDA Command.

2: Over 24,000 sick and starving troops (American and Filipino) are now trapped on the Bataan Peninsula.

Japanese make landings on New Guinea, most importantly at Hollandia.

3: Japanese forces begin an all-out assault on United States and Filipino troops in Bataan.

Sustained Japanese air attacks on Mandalay in Burma.

4: Germans plan "Baedeker raids" on touristy or historic British sites, in revenge for the Lübeck bombing.

5: On Bataan, the Japanese overwhelm Mt. Samat, a strong point on Allied defensive line.

The Japanese Navy attacks Colombo in Ceylon. Royal Navy heavy cruisers HMS Cornwall and HMS Dorsetshire are sunk southwest of the island.

Adolf Hitler issues Directive No. 41, outlining his plans for the coming summer offensive in Russia. The main offensive is directed to seize the Russian oil fields in the Caucasus; a secondary thrust is to capture Stalingrad and protect the flank of the main advance.

RAF bombing raid on Cologne.

6: Japanese naval forces put troops ashore on Manus Island in the Bismarck Archipelago (some sources give a date of 8 April for these landings).

8: Heavy RAF bombing of Hamburg.

American forces are strained for one last offensive on Bataan.

With the withdrawal of HMS Penelope from Malta, Force K in Malta comes to a close.

9: The Japanese Navy launches an air raid on Trincomalee in Ceylon; Royal Navy aircraft carrier HMS Hermes and Royal Australian Navy destroyer HMAS Vampire are sunk off the country's east coast.

Bataan falls to the Japanese. The "Bataan Death March" begins, as the captives are taken off to detention camps in the north. Corregidor, in the middle of Manila Bay, remains a final point of resistance.

10: Japanese land on Cebu Island, a large middle island of the Philippines.

12: Japanese forces capture Migyaungye in Burma.

13: Anton Schmid an Austrian soldier of the Wehrmacht is put to death, after witnessing the Ponary Massacre and saving Jews.

14: Winston Churchill, concerned that the situation in Malta will cause the Axis forces in North Africa to be better supplied than British forces, sends a telegram to Sir Stafford Cripps in Cairo, asking him to pressure General Auchinleck to take offensive action before this can occur.

USS Roper becomes the first American ship to sink a U-boat.

15: Malta is awarded the George Cross by King George VI for "heroism and devotion".

Soldiers of the I Burma Corps begin to destroy the infrastructure of the Yenangyaung oil fields to prevent the advancing Japanese from capturing them intact.

17: French General Henri Giraud, who was captured in 1940, escapes from a castle prison at Königstein by lowering himself down the castle wall and jumping on board a moving train, which takes him to the French border.

18: Doolittle Raid on Nagoya, Tokyo and Yokohama. Jimmy Doolittle's B-25s take off from USS Hornet. The raids are a great boost of morale for Americans.

The Eastern Sea Frontier, the United States Navy operational command in charge of the East Coast of the United States, somewhat belatedly forces a blackout along the East Coast. This deprives U-boat commanders of background illumination, but provides only a very little relief from U-boat attack; as the nights grow shorter more U-boat attacks are occurring in daylight hours.

20: General Dobbie, Governor-General and Commander-in-Chief of Malta, sends a message to Winston Churchill saying "it is obvious that the very worst may happen if we cannot replenish our vital needs, especially flour and ammunition, and that very soon...." Churchill concludes from this and other "disturbing news" that Dobbie is not capable enough for such an important job, and decides to replace him with Lord Gort.

USS Wasp delivers 47 Spitfire Mk. V fighters of No. 603 Squadron RAF to Malta; the planes are destroyed, mostly on the ground, by intense Axis air raids before they can affect the course of battle.

23: Beginning of so-called Baedeker Raids by the Luftwaffe on English provincial towns like Exeter, Bath, Norwich, and York; attacks continue sporadically until June 6.

24: Heavy bombing of Rostock, Germany by RAF.

26: Hitler assumes a kind of supreme authority over Germany.

27: Rostock is bombed for fourth night in a row.

A national plebiscite is held in Canada on the issue of conscription. It passes in favor of conscription; French Canadians are the main, though not the only, objectors.

The finalized thirty-three page draft for the German Amerika Bomber trans-Atlantic range strategic bomber design competition is submitted to the RLM.

28: The bulk of the British assault troops depart Durban in South Africa for Madagascar; the slower ships, carrying transport and heavy weapons, have departed in great secrecy some days earlier.

29: The "Baedeker raids" continue, focused on Norwich and York.

The Japanese cut The Burma Road with the capture of Lashio in Burma.

Adolf Hitler summons Benito Mussolini and Galeazzo Ciano to a summit conference at Salzburg. Like most Hitlerian conferences, this one is actually a thinly-disguised attempt to harangue the invitees into compliance with the Fuehrer's will; in this case, the Italians are to commit more troops to the Eastern Front. Hitler is successful, and Mussolini agrees to send an additional seven divisions, as well as the two already promised. These unfortunate troops will be formed into the Eighth Italian Army and attached to von Bock's (later von Weichs's) Army Group B.

== May ==
1: Rommel readies for a new offensive during the early part of this month.

Troops of the Japanese Fifteenth Army under General Shojiro Iida take Mandalay and Monywa, securing the western terminus of the Burma Road.

2: In response to American intelligence intercepts, which warn of the impending Japanese landings, the Australian garrison is evacuated from Tulagi.

3: In the initial move of the Japanese strategic plan to capture Port Moresby, Japanese forces under Admiral Kiyohide Shima make unopposed landings on Tulagi, opening the Battle of the Coral Sea.

American General Joseph Stilwell decides that nothing more can be accomplished in Burma, and that the time has come to evacuate.

4: US Rear Admiral Frank Jack Fletcher's Task Force 17 makes the first carrier strike of the Battle of the Coral Sea, attacking Japanese naval targets near Tulagi.

Howell and his party of 114, mostly Americans, begin their trek to the Indian border and safety. To reach India, Stilwell will not only have to stay ahead of the Japanese, but beat the coming monsoon.

5: Heavy Japanese artillery attack on Corregidor.

British forces begin "Operation Ironclad": the invasion of Madagascar to keep the Vichy French territory from falling to a possible Japanese invasion.

The city of Exeter is bombed by the Luftwaffe, another "Baedeker Raid".

In the Coral Sea, both Japanese and American carrier aircraft spend this day and the following one searching for each other's ships, with no success, even though at one point the opposing carrier groups are separated by less than a hundred miles of ocean.

General Stilwell abandons his trucks, which constantly become stuck and so are actually impeding progress rather than aiding it. He retains his Jeeps, which do better. Late in the day his party arrives at Indaw.

6: On Corregidor, Lt. General Jonathan M. Wainwright surrenders the last U.S. forces in the Philippines to Lt. General Masaharu Homma. About 12,000 are made prisoners. Homma will soon face criticism from his superiors over the amount of time it has taken him to reduce the Philippines, and be forced into retirement (1943).

After a pep talk, General Stilwell and his party of 114 set out from Indaw on foot, with only 11 Jeeps to carry their supplies and any incapacitated, to reach the Indian border. He sends a last radio message which ends, "Catastrophe quite possible." The radio is then destroyed.

7: Vichy forces surrender Diego Suarez, the most important port in Madagascar, to British forces involved in Operation Ironclad. However, the Vichy forces are able to withdraw in good order.

In the Coral Sea, Japanese search planes spot refueling ship USS Neosho and destroyer USS Sims, which have retired from Fletcher's Task Force 17 into what should have been safer waters to refuel Sims. They are mistaken for an aircraft carrier and a cruiser. Japanese Admiral Takagi, believing he has at last found the location of Fletcher's main force, orders a full out attack by carriers Shōkaku and Zuikaku and sinks both ships. This distraction helps prevent the Japanese from finding the real location of Fletcher's carriers. Meanwhile, Fletcher has a similar false alarm, the spotting of two cruisers and two destroyers being mistakenly encrypted as "two carriers and four cruisers." By chance, though, planes from USS Lexington and USS Yorktown stumble across light carrier Shōhō while pursuing the false lead and sink her, leading to the first use in the American Navy of the signal, "Scratch one flattop." Admiral Inoue is so alarmed by the loss of Shōhō he halts the Port Moresby invasion group north of the Louisiades until the American carriers can be found and destroyed.

In Burma, General Stilwell must abandon his Jeeps. From here on all in the party will have to march. The fifty-nine-year-old General decides a cadence of one hundred five beats per minute will best match the disparate abilities of his party, and they march fifty minutes and rest ten each hour.

8: In the Coral Sea, each side finally locates the other's main carrier groups, consisting of Japanese carriers Shōkaku and Zuikaku, and American carriers Lexington and Yorktown. Several attacks follow. Only Zuikaku escapes unscathed; Shōkaku has her flight deck bent, requiring two months' repairs; Lexington is sunk and Yorktown damaged. Fletcher retires; this action closes the Battle. While arguably a stalemate or even tactical victory for the Japanese, who have sunk the most tonnage and the only large carrier, the Battle of the Coral Sea is usually seen as a strategic victory for the United States, as Admiral Inoue cancels the Port Moresby operation, the first significant failure of a Japanese strategic operation in the Pacific Theatre. In addition, Yorktown will be repaired in time to make important contributions at Midway (although she will not survive), whereas neither the damaged Shōkaku nor Zuikaku (which, although not directly attacked, has suffered unsustainable losses in aircraft), will be able to refit in time for Midway, giving the Japanese only four operable carriers available for that battle.

The Germans take the Kerch peninsula in the eastern Crimea.

9: On the night of 8/9 May 1942, gunners of the Ceylon Garrison Artillery on Horsburgh Island in the Cocos Islands rebelled. Their mutiny was crushed and three of them were executed, the only British Commonwealth soldiers to be executed for mutiny during the Second World War.

USS Wasp and HMS Eagle deliver a second contingent of Spitfires to Malta in Operation Bowery. A few days later, a grateful Churchill will signal Wasp "Who says a Wasp can't sting twice?" These aircraft, employed more aggressively than those previously delivered, turn the tide in the skies over Malta during the next few days, and the Axis is forced to abandon daylight bombing. This is a major turning point in the Siege, and thus in the North African Campaign, although the approaches to the island remain subject to deadly and accurate Axis air attack, preventing efficient re-supply of the island.

In Burma, General Stilwell and his party begin crossing the Uyu River. Only four small rafts are available, and the crossing takes the better part of two days.

10: Unaware that the tide is turning even as he speaks, Kesselring informs Hitler that Malta has been neutralized.

Churchill, growing ever more frustrated with General Auchinleck's inactivity, finally sends him a telegram with a clear order; attack in time to cover for the Harpoon/Vigorous convoys to Malta during the dark of the moon in early June. This places Auchinleck in the position of complying or resigning. Auchinleck does not immediately reply, leaving Churchill, CIGS, and the War Cabinet in a state of suspense.

12: German submarine U-553, commanded by Kapitänleutnant Karl Thurmann, sinks British freighter Nicoya near the mouth of the St. Lawrence River, signalling the opening of the Battle of St. Lawrence.

Second Battle of Kharkov – In the eastern Ukraine, Soviet forces of Marshal Timoshenko's Southwest Theatre of Operations, including Gorodnyanski's 6th Army and Kharitonov's 9th Army, initiate a major offensive to capture Kharkov from the Germans. 9th Army is to attack first, with a primary objective of Krasnograd, and a secondary one of Poltava; 6th Army is to follow immediately. After 9th Army has captured Krasnograd, 6th Army is to swing north and link up with 28th Army and 57th Army, the latter two formations having meanwhile cut the railway between Belgorod and Kharkov.

The 33-page Amerika Bomber trans-Atlantic strategic bomber design competition proposal document makes it to Reichsmarschall Hermann Goering's offices, with ten copies printed — six of these were sent to the Luftwaffe, and four held in reserve.

13: General Stilwell and his party cross the Chindwin River. They are now almost certainly safe from the Japanese, but still dependent on their own supplies in a very remote area and racing to beat the monsoon.

14: In response to the Soviet offensive in the Kharkov area, Hitler orders elements of Richthofen's Fliegerkorps VIII north to do ground support missions. As a result, by the end of the day 14 May, the Germans have established a tentative but increasing air superiority over the Kharkov sector. In addition, on this day Hitler orders General Kleist, whose command is in positions opposite and to the south of the Soviets' left flank, to quickly prepare and launch a strong armoured counter-offensive.

In Burma, General Stilwell and his party begin ascending the Naga Hills. They are met at Kawlum by a relief expedition headed by British colonial administrator Tim Sharpe. "Food, doctor, ponies, and everything," notes a grateful Stilwell in his diary.

15: In the United States, a bill creating the Women's Auxiliary Army Corps (WAAC) is signed into law.

General Stilwell crosses the border into India.

16: United States 1st Armored Division arrives in Northern Ireland.

17: In the salient north of Kharkov, Russian 28th and 57th Armies are having trouble making progress against General Paulus's (German) 6th Army.

For once, Adolf Hitler has not hobbled his local commander with a strict "no retreat" order, and Paulus is free to conduct an efficient delaying action. In addition, Paulus' troops are largely up to strength and fully equipped as a result of preparations for the upcoming drive to Stalingrad. In the south salient, Kharitonov's 9th Army has routed the Romanian (3rd and/or 4th Army; accounts differ) troops in his path and captured Krasnograd, and is proceeding to Poltava; Gorodnyanski's 6th Army has made its planned turn to the north to link up with 28th and 57th Armies. 9th Army's impetus has stretched Kharitonov's armoured units out along a seventy-mile track, diluting their strength; and attempts to cover his left flank by driving the Germans back from it have been unsuccessful. The Russians take only a few prisoners along this flank, but Timoshenko is dismayed by the variety of units, especially armoured units, this handful of men represent (this is because Kleist is concentrating troops in this area in preparation for his counter-offensive). Timoshenko loses confidence and has his Political Officer Nikita Khrushchev ring up the Stavka and ask for permission to halt while he secures his left flank; Stavka refuses.

It has been a week since Churchill sent his ultimatum to General Auchinleck, and he has not yet received a reply. He sends a terse follow-up: "It is necessary for me to have some account of your general intentions in light of our recent telegrams." Again there is no immediate reply.

18: The Red Army is in a major retreat at Kerch, after large numbers surrender.

In the salient north of Kharkov, the Soviet offensive has bogged down. In the southern salient, Kleist has launched his counter-offensive. It is immediately successful and by the end of the first day the leading elements have reached the confluence of the Oksol and Donetz rivers, greatly narrowing the base of the salient. In the process the Germans traverse and disrupt so many lines of communication that Kharitonov's 9th Army begins to lose cohesion as a fighting force, and becomes useless as a screen to protect Gorodnyanski's 6th Army which, because of its northward progress, is badly disposed to repel the German attacks coming from the south.

The Assam Rifles give General Stilwell's party a formal salute in honor of their arrival at Ukhrul, but can offer no motorized transport; the nearest road passable by trucks is still a day's march away, and there are no Jeeps yet in this part of India.

19: At Kharkov, Kleist's counter-offensive continues to prosper; and now Paulus launches a second counter-attack from the north, designed to link up with Kleist's and encircle as many Soviet troops as possible. The Stavka, gradually becoming aware of the extent of the danger, orders Gorodnyanski's 6th Army to halt their advance. But by now Timoshenko is planning to extricate what forces he can before the two German spearheads link up.

General Stilwell and his party at last reach the truck roadhead at Litan; by this time the monsoon rains have started.

General Auchinleck at last replies to Churchill's somewhat urgent telegram of the 10th, saying he will have an attack ready by the sailing of the Harpoon/Vigorous convoys for Malta.

20: The Japanese conquest of Burma is complete; it is called a "military catastrophe". Coincidentally, on this same day General Stilwell arrives in Imphal and dismisses his evacuation party. All 114 have arrived, although some have to be hospitalized due to exhaustion; one of whom, Major Frank Merrill, later commander of Merrill's Marauders, is diagnosed to have had a mild heart attack en route.

At Kharkov, as Kleist's and Paulus' forward elements draw ever closer together, Timoshenko sends his subordinate General Kostenko into the salient to organize a fighting retreat, or, failing that, maximize what can be saved.

Molotov arrives in London, and high-level discussions begin the next day.

21: Invasion of Malta postponed indefinitely.

In discussions with Winston Churchill and Anthony Eden, Molotov continues to press Soviet demands for territorial acquisitions made during the run-up to war, including the Baltic states, Eastern Poland, and Bessarabia. Churchill cannot or will not agree to these demands, and the talks become deadlocked.

22: Mexico declares war on the Axis.

23: Kleist's and Paulus' tanks meet up at Balakleya, southeast of Kharkov, encircling most of the Soviets' 6th and 9th Armies.

At the high-level Soviet/United Kingdom talks in London, Anthony Eden suggests abandoning attempts to reach territorial understandings, and instead conclude a twenty-years' alliance. Molotov, whose diplomatic position is weakening rapidly as the Soviet military situation deteriorates at Kerch and Kharkov, expresses interest.

25: In preparation for the next battle, the Japanese naval strategists send diversionary forces to the Aleutians.

26: The Anglo-Soviet Treaty: their foreign secretaries agree that no peace will be signed by one without the approval of the other. (An important treaty since Himmler and others will attempt to separate the two nations at the end of the war.)

Rommel begins a Spring offensive at the Gazala line (west of Tobruk). It opens with "Rommel's Moonlight Ride," a dramatic mechanized dash around 1st Free French Brigade Group positions at Bir Hakeim on the British left (desertward) flank, conducted by moonlight during the night of 26/27 May. In the process Rommel disperses 3rd Indian Motorized Brigade, some six hundred of whom are taken prisoner and then released in the desert, and who will make their way to Bir Hakeim. The offensive lasts well into June and ends with a total victory for Rommel.

The Free French land on Wallis and Futuna and get rid of the pro-Vichy government there.

27: Reinhard Heydrich, head of the Reich Security Main Office, is fatally wounded in Prague during Operation Anthropoid by Czechoslovak soldiers; he would die on June 4 from his wounds.

British use American Sherman tanks in attempts to stop Rommel's attacks on the Gazala line.

USS Yorktown, damaged at the Coral Sea, limps into Pearl Harbor; it is ordered to get repaired and ready as fast as possible for the impending battle.

In occupied Belgium, wearing of the "yellow badge" becomes compulsory for Jews.

29: The Jews in France are ordered to wear the yellow Star of David.

Japanese forces have large successes south of Shanghai.

Rommel turns his troops to Bir Hachim on the south edge of the Gazala line; once it is taken, he can move north and destroy the Allied emplacements in the line.

30: "The Thousand Bomber Raid" on Cologne, revealing new area bombing techniques.

USS Yorktown leaves Pearl after hasty repairs and moves to join USS Enterprise for the next expected battle.

31: Huge German successes around Kharkov, with envelopment of several Red Army armies.

Japanese midget subs enter Sydney harbour and sink one support ship; fears of invasion grow.

So effective has been the use of the Spitfires delivered to Malta in Operation Bowery earlier in the month, that Kesselring has only eighty-three serviceable aircraft left, as opposed to more than four hundred at the peak of Axis air strength earlier in the spring.

Rommel's offensive has stalled out well short of Tobruk, due to resistance by British 1st Armoured Division and 7th Armoured Division, partially equipped with the new American Grant tanks. He is also confronted by a long supply line, which must reach around and is under constant threat from the 1st Free French Brigade Group position at Bir Hakeim. He orders two lanes cut through the British minefields which run from Gazala to Bir Hakeim, on either side of fortified positions held by the 150th Brigade of British 50th Infantry Division. He then gathers the bulk of his forces near the outlets of these two lanes, completing the process on the 31st. These tactics serve the triple purpose of shortening his supply line, encircling 150th Brigade, and allowing him to use the British minefields as part of his defences. The area of concentration, promptly nicknamed "the Cauldron" by British Command, will be the focus of the battle for the next few days.

== June ==
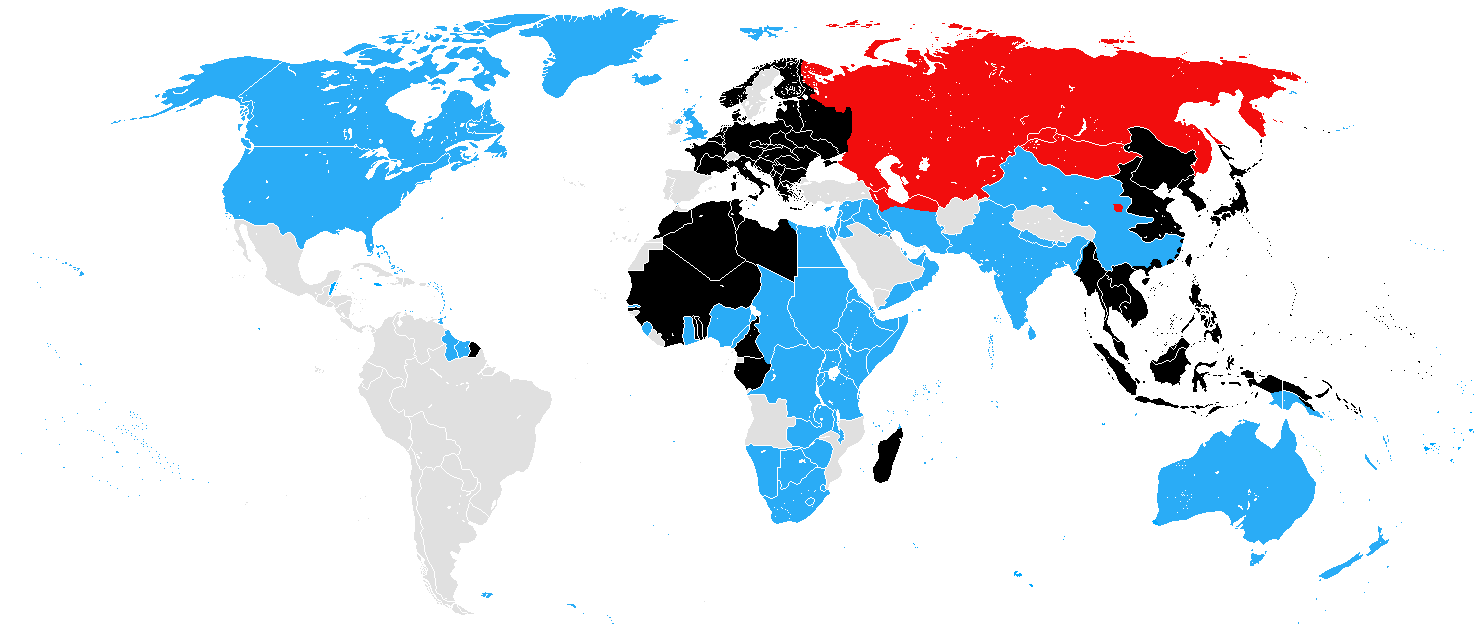
The state of the Allies and Axis powers in June 1942

1: First reports in the West that gas is being used to kill the Jews sent to "the East".

To further secure his supply lines, Rommel launches an attack on 150th Brigade of British 50th Infantry Division, whose position he has surrounded. Since he is attacking from the east against a position designed to defend against attacks from the west, and since there is scant hope of relief, there is little 150th Brigade can do and they are soon overwhelmed.

2: Further heavy bombing of industrial sites in Germany, centred mainly on Essen.

3: The British coal industry is nationalised.

Japan launches air raids against Alaska in the Battle of Dutch Harbor, beginning the Aleutian Islands Campaign.

The Battle of Midway opens with ineffective attacks by land-based American B-17s on the approaching Japanese fleet. Admiral Nagumo, in charge of the Japanese carrier force (Hiryu, Soryu, Akagi, and Kaga) is unable to locate any American aircraft carriers and decides to attack Midway's land-based air defences the first thing the next morning, which in any event is one of his planned tasks.

4: In the Battle of Midway, the day opens with Admiral Nagumo's attack on the air defences of the island.

A good deal of damage is done and many aircraft destroyed on both sides, but in the end the island's airbase is still functional. Nagumo plans a second attack on the island, and begins refueling and rearming his planes. Meanwhile, attacks are launched from all three American aircraft carriers in the area. Planes from USS Hornet, Yorktown, and Enterprise all find the targets, although most of the planes from Hornet follow an incorrect heading and miss this attack. Torpedo Squadron 8 from Hornet breaks and follows the correct heading. The Devastators of "Torp 8" are all shot down without doing any damage; there is only one survivor, George H. Gay, Jr. of Waco, Texas, who watches the battle unfold from the water. The torpedo attack fails, but draws the Japanese Combat Air Patrol down to low altitude, and they are unable to effectively repel the dive bombers from Yorktown and Enterprise when they arrive. The bombs find the Japanese flight decks crowded with fueling lines and explosive ordnance, and Akagi, Kaga, and Soryu are all soon reduced to blazing hulks, Akagi hit by only one bomb dropped by Lt. Commander Richard Halsey Best; only Hiryu escapes with no hits. Admiral Nagumo shifts his flag from Akagi to another ship, the cruiser Nagara, and orders attacks on the American carriers, one by a group of Aichi D3A dive bombers and a second by Nakajima B5N torpedo bombers. The Japanese planes find Yorktown (thinking Yorktown already sunk, the second attack group assume it must be Enterprise) and damage it so badly that Yorktown must be abandoned. Admiral Fletcher shifts his flag to cruiser Astoria and cedes operational command to Admiral Spruance. The attacks on Yorktown give away Hiryu's continued operations, though, and it is promptly attacked and will sink the next day, Admiral Yamaguchi choosing to go down with it. Of note, Hiryu and the other three destroyed Japanese carriers had participated in the attack on Pearl Harbor.

Reinhard Heydrich, a key architect of the Holocaust, dies in Prague from medical complications that had arisen from injuries suffered from an attempted assassination by Czechoslovak agents one week earlier during Operation Anthropoid.

5: At Gazala British forces of the Eighth Army, commanded by General Ritchie, launch a major counter-attack against Rommel's forces in the Cauldron. The attack fails, partly because Rommel has already recovered his critical logistics situation and has established an excellent defensive position, but also in large part due to German anti-tank tactics; 32nd Army Tank Brigade, for example, loses 50 of 70 tanks. By early afternoon Rommel is clearly in control of the situation and attacks the British position known as "Knightsbridge" with the Ariete and 21st Panzer divisions. Several British tactical headquarters positions are overrun, and command and control of the British forces becomes problematic; as a result, several brigades are stranded in the Cauldron when the British retirement begins. In addition, the British suffer further heavy tank losses.

United States declares war on Bulgaria, Hungary, and Romania.

7: In the Aleutian Islands, Japanese forces invade Attu and Kiska. This is the first invasion of American soil in 128 years. Japanese occupation of Attu and Kiska begins.

The Battle of Midway comes to a close; USS Yorktown sinks; four Japanese carriers and one cruiser are sunk. The battle is viewed as a turning point in the Pacific war.

The Greek People's Liberation Army makes its first appearance at Domnista, where Aris Velouchiotis proclaims the start of armed resistance against the Axis.

8: Malta receives a squadron of Spitfires.

A Japanese submarine fires several shells into a residential area in Sydney but with little effect.

9: At Bir Hakeim, Rommel renews his attacks on the 1st Free French Brigade's "box". Although the Free French continue to hold out, their perimeter, never the largest, is dangerously reduced in size, and their position becomes untenable. General Ritchie orders 1st Free French Brigade to withdraw the following day.

10: Nazis burn the Czech village of Lidice as reprisal for the killing of Reinhard Heydrich. All male adults and children are killed, and all females are taken off to concentration camps.

Rommel pushes the Free French forces out of Bir Hakeim, a fortress south-west of Tobruk. Although the 1st Free French brigade is largely surrounded, their commander, General Koenig, is able to find and fight his way through gaps in Rommel's widely dispersed forces.

11: Two convoys set out for Malta, one from Gibraltar (code named 'Harpoon') and the other from Alexandria (code named 'Vigorous'), with desperately needed supplies of food, fuel, and ammunition. The hope is that the Axis will concentrate their attacks on whichever convoy they find first, allowing the other one to get through.

12: Heavy fighting in Sevastopol with serious losses of life on both sides.

At Gazala, the British are forced out of the defensive position known as 'Knightsbridge;' it is only approximately fifteen miles from the Tobruk perimeter (some sources give a date of 13 June for this; the withdrawal may have been in operation on both calendar days).

13: The United States opens its Office of War Information, a centre to coordinate and properly disseminated wartime information from the military/administration to the public .

'Black Saturday' for the 8th Army at the Battle of Gazala; during the course of the day Rommel does great damage to the British armour. At the end of the day not only have unsustainably large amounts of British armour been destroyed, but both 50th Division and 1st South African Division, who have largely retained their forward positions along the Gazala Line, are threatened with envelopment. The position of 50th Division is especially grave since Rommel's armour now ranges freely between them and safety.

14: At the Gazala Line, the British position has become untenable, and General Auchinleck authorizes General Ritchie to make a concerted withdrawal from forward positions along the line.

1st South African Division is able to withdraw along the coastal road, but the road cannot accommodate all the troops at once, and this route is in any event is under threat of being cut by Rommel's forces; so troops including 50th Division must first breakout to the southwest, through the area occupied by Italian X Corps, and then turn east to rejoin 8th Army. This somewhat daring operation is concluded successfully. The RAF forces available, although outnumbered, make a valiant effort to cover the retreat. Churchill sends Auchinleck a telegram beginning, 'To what position does Ritchie want to withdraw the Gazala troops? Presume there is no question in any case of giving up Tobruk.'

The convoy 'Vigorous', en route to Malta, sights a large Italian naval squadron headed toward it. 'Harpoon' comes under attack for the first time; 'Vigorous' has been under air attack almost since leaving port.

15: General Auchinleck sends Churchill a reply to the latter's telegram of the 14th, saying in part, "...I have no intention whatever of giving up Tobruk."

16: Two convoys moving toward Malta suffer heavy losses; German air forces continue to bomb the island itself. Operation Harpoon arrives in Malta, but only two of the six supply ships survive; one of them has lost part of its cargo due to mine damage. The sinking of the tanker Kentucky means that there will be precious little aviation fuel added to the dwindling RAF stocks on Malta. Late in the day, Operation Vigorous is cancelled; the convoy diverts back to Alexandria.

Churchill, about to leave for America, takes the unusual step of sending a letter to King George VI, advising him to make Anthony Eden Prime Minister should Churchill not survive the journey.

17: Tobruk is now surrounded.

18: The Manhattan Project is started, the beginning of a scientific approach to nuclear weapons in the US, building on research work done in the UK.

Winston Churchill arrives in Washington for meetings with Roosevelt.

The siege of Tobruk intensifies; some defending forces are pulled back to Egypt.

21: Afrika Korps recaptures Tobruk, with 35,000 men captured; the road to Egypt is now open as the British retreat deep into Egypt. Tobruk's loss is a grievous blow to British morale. German land forces have been assisted by Luftwaffe attacks.

24: General Dwight D. Eisenhower arrives in London ready to assume the post of Commander of American forces in Europe.

25: Another massive British "Thousand Bomber" raid, this time on Bremen; the raiders suffer grievous losses.

26: The Germans drive toward Rostov-on-Don.

27: Convoy PQ 17 sets sail from Iceland; only 11 of 37 ships will survive.

28: Case Blue, the German plan to capture Stalingrad and the Soviet Union oil fields in the Caucasus, begins. Generally, forces are shifted to the South.

Mersa Matruh, Egypt, about 140 miles from Alexandria, falls to Rommel.

30: United States deploys II Corps to the European Theater.

== July ==
1: First Battle of El Alamein begins as Rommel begins first assault on British defences.

Sevastopol falls to the Germans; the end of Red Army resistance in the Crimea.

2: Churchill survives a censure motion in the House of Commons.

3: Guadalcanal is now firmly in the hands of the Japanese.

4: First air missions by the United States Army Air Forces in Europe.

11: Rommel's forces are now stalemated before El Alamein, largely because of a lack of ammunition.

1942 Eleftherias Square roundup: Jews are rounded up and humiliated at Thessaloniki in German-occupied Greece.

12: It now becomes clear that Stalingrad is the largest challenge to the invaders.

A balloon from Operation Outward knocks out a power station near Leipzig.

15: The only action around El Alamein is light skirmishing.

16: Vel' d'Hiv Roundup: On order from the Vichy France government headed by Pierre Laval, French police officers mass arrest 13,152 Jews and hold them at the Winter Velodrome before deportation to Auschwitz.

18: The Germans test fly the Messerschmitt Me 262 V3 third prototype using only its jet engines for the first time.

19: Battle of the Atlantic: German Grand Admiral Karl Dönitz orders the last U-boats to withdraw from their United States Atlantic coast positions in response to an increasingly effective American convoy system.

20: After landing in the Buna-Gona area, the Japanese in New Guinea move across the Owen Stanley mountain range aiming at Port Moresby in the south-eastern part of the island, close to Australia; a small Australian force begins rearguard action on the Kokoda Track.

22: The systematic deportation of Jews from the Warsaw Ghetto begins.
: Treblinka II, "a model" extermination camp, is opened in Poland.

23: Germans take Rostov-on-the-Don; the Red Army is in a general retreat along the Don River.

26: A second attack by the British under Auchinleck fails against Rommel. First Battle of El Alamein may be said to be over.

27: Heavy RAF incendiary attack on Hamburg.

29: The Japanese take Kokoda, halfway along the Owen Stanley pass to Port Moresby.

30: Continuing stalemate at El Alamein between Rommel and Auchinleck.

== August ==
1: The Germans continue their successful advance toward Stalingrad.

3: A convoy to Malta is decimated by the Luftwaffe and U-boats.

5: The U.S. planning team for Operation Torch, which includes George S. Patton; Jimmy Doolittle; and Hoyt S. Vandenberg, meets in Washington, D.C. to join the combined planning team from London, England.
: Henrik Hersch Goldschmidt aka Janusz Korczak and almost 200 children of his orphanage, along with his staff, are led to the Treblinka II death camp, and killed there that day, probably with gas.

7: Operation Watchtower begins the Guadalcanal Campaign as American forces invade Gavutu, Guadalcanal, Tulagi and Tanambogo in the Solomon Islands.

8: Six of the eight German would-be saboteurs involved in Operation Pastorius are executed in Washington, D.C.

The naval Battle of Savo Island, near Guadalcanal; the Americans lose three cruisers, the Australians one.

9: Numerous riots in favour of independence in India; Mahatma Gandhi is arrested.

10: Rommel begins an attack around El Alamein, but by September he is back to his original lines.

11: HMS Eagle, a carrier on convoy duty to Malta, is torpedoed and sinks with heavy loss of life.

12: At a conference in Moscow, Churchill informs Stalin that there will not be a "second front" in 1942.

American forces establish bases in the New Hebrides islands.

Fighting increases as the Germans approach Stalingrad.

13: General Bernard Montgomery appointed commander of the Eighth Army, which encompassed Allied ground forces in Egypt and Libya; Churchill is anxious to see more offensive action on the part of the Allies in North Africa.

Disastrous end to the Malta convoy, but one tanker and four merchant ships get through.

15: Malta is supplied via Operation Pedestal.

17: First US Army Air Forces B-17 heavy bomber raid in Europe, targeting the Sotteville railroad yards at Rouen, France.

Raid on Makin Atoll by elements of the US Marine 2nd Raider Battalion against the Japanese garrison. The Marines are withdrawn the following day under difficult circumstances.

18: In New Guinea, both Japanese and Australian reinforcements arrive.

19: Operation Jubilee, a raid by British and Canadian forces on Dieppe, France, ends in disaster; they come under heavy gunfire and eventually most are killed or captured by the German defenders.

20: Henderson Field on Guadalcanal receives its first American fighter planes.

21: Japanese counter-attack at Henderson Field; in another foray at the Tenaru (or Ilu) River, many Japanese are killed in a banzai charge.

22: Brazil declares war on the Axis countries, partly in response to numerous riots by a populace angry at the sinking of Brazilian ships.

Massacre of Jews at Stanislau, Poland (later Ivano-Frankivsk, Ukraine): in what the Nazi authorities describe as a "reprisal action", 1,000 Jews are shot, including women and girls who are raped beforehand at Gestapo headquarters; the head of the Judenrat (Mordechai Goldstein) is hanged publicly, along with 20 members of the Jewish police.

23: Massive German air raid on Stalingrad.

24: The naval battle of the Eastern Solomons; USS Enterprise is badly damaged and the Japanese lose one light carrier, Ryujo.

26: Battle of Milne Bay begins: Japanese forces land and launch a full-scale assault on an Australian base near the eastern tip of New Guinea.

27: Marshal Georgii Zhukov is appointed to the command of the Stalingrad defence; the Luftwaffe is now delivering heavy strikes on the city.

28: Incendiary bombs dropped by a Japanese seaplane cause a forest fire in Oregon.

30: The Battle of Alam Halfa, a few miles south of El Alamein begins. This will be Rommel's last attempt to break through the Allied lines in Egypt; the air superiority of the Desert Air Force will play a significant role for the Allies.

In German-occupied Luxembourg, the civil occupation administration, in place since 1940, is abolished and the country annexed into Nazi Germany.

31: Start of the 1942 Luxembourgish general strike against conscription.

== September ==
1: US Navy Construction Battalion personnel, Seabees, began to arrive at Guadalcanal.

3: The Battle of Stalingrad proper may be said to have begun on this date, with German troops in the suburbs; even civilian men and boys are conscripted by the Red Army to assist in the defence.

4: Irish Republican Army riots occur in Belfast during the night.

Manhattan Engineering District is formally created, full-effort development of the atomic bomb and production of nuclear fuels is begun.

Chief of State of Vichy France Philippe Pétain and Prime Minister Pierre Laval create what will become the Service du travail obligatoire (STO).

5: Australian and U.S. forces defeat Japanese forces at Milne Bay, Papua, the first outright defeat for Japanese land forces in the Pacific War. Their evacuation and the failure to establish an airbase eases the threat to Australia.

6: The Black Sea port of Novorossiysk is taken by the Germans.

9: A Japanese plane drops more incendiaries on Oregon, but with little effect.

10: RAF blasts Düsseldorf with large incendiary bombing.

12: RMS Laconia, carrying civilians, Allied soldiers, and Italian POWs, is torpedoed off the coast of West Africa and sinks.

SS commander Brandt orders 3,000–4,000 Stanislau Jews deported to the Belzec death camp on Rosh Hashana, the Jewish New Year holiday, and they were killed there that day.

12–14: American troops push back the Japanese in the Battle of Edson's Ridge.

13: The Battle for Stalingrad continues; it is now totally surrounded by the Germans. On the Soviet Union side General Vasily Chuikov is put in charge of the defence.

14: The Japanese retreat again from Henderson Field, Guadalcanal.

The Japanese are now within 30 miles of Port Moresby, New Guinea, on the Kokoda trail.

Continued convoy losses in the Atlantic.

15: Americans send troops to Port Moresby as reinforcements for the Australian defenders.

Light carrier USS Wasp is sunk by a Japanese submarine off Guadalcanal.

18: Battle of the "grain silo" in Stalingrad; the Germans are beaten back. The Red Army begins ferrying troops across the Volga at night.

19: Allied attack on Jalo, Libya is repulsed by Germans.

20: RAF bombs Munich and Saarbrücken.

The Greek Panhellenic Union of Fighting Youths blows up the offices of the pro-Nazi National-Socialist Patriotic Organisation in central Athens, thwarting attempts to raise a Greek volunteer legion for the Eastern Front.

23: General Rommel leaves North Africa for medical treatment in Germany.

23–27: In the Third Battle of Matanikau River, Guadalcanal, Japanese naval bombardment and landing forces nearly destroy Henderson Field in an attempt to take it, but the land forces are soon driven back.

24: United States of America deploys the I Corps to the Pacific Theater.

28: The Japanese continue their retreat back down the Kokoda Track in New Guinea.

30: The Eagle Squadron (American volunteers in the RAF) are officially transferred to the US Army Air Force.

Hitler speaks to the nation and boasts that Stalingrad will be taken.

== October ==
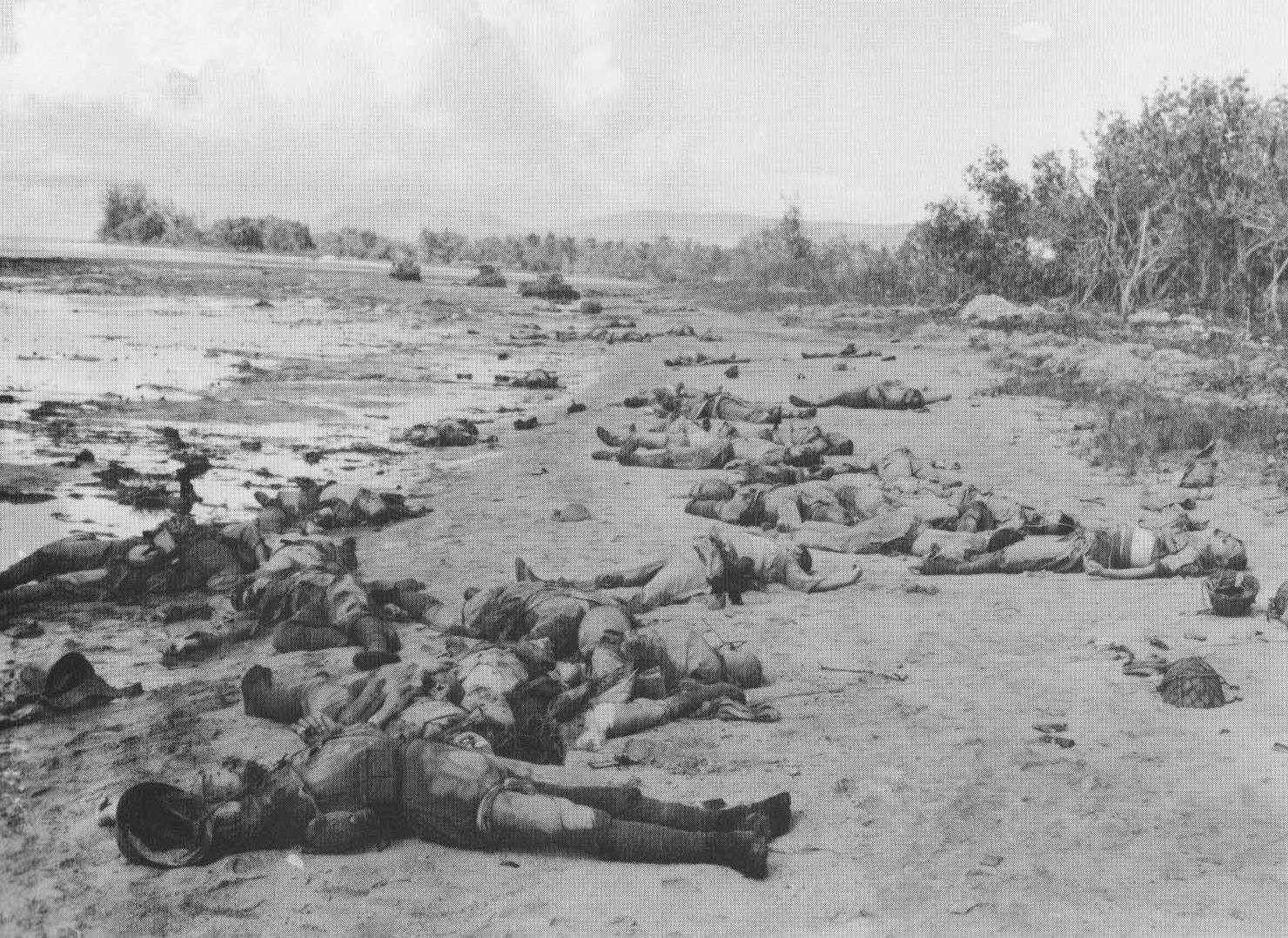
Dead Japanese soldiers at the Matanikau River, Guadalcanal

3: First successful launch of A4-rocket at Peenemünde, Germany. The rocket flies 147 kilometres wide and reaches a height of 84.5 kilometres and is therefore the first man-made object reaching space.

4: British Commandos raid Sark, a Channel Island, capturing one German soldier.

6: By mutual arrangement, the Allies agree on a strategy whereby Americans will bomb in the daytime and the RAF at night.

7: Third Battle of the Matanikau.

11: Battle of Cape Esperance.

On the Northwest coast of Guadalcanal, United States Navy ships intercept and defeat a Japanese fleet on their way to reinforce troops on the island. With the help of radar they sink one cruiser and several Japanese destroyers.

12: The Red Army methods of ferrying troops across the Volga and into Stalingrad directly seems to be a success, as the German advance comes to a halt.

The US 100th Infantry Battalion, a force of over 1,400 predominantly Nisei became active.

13: Heavy bombardment of Henderson Field, Guadalcanal by the Japanese navy.

14: A German U-boat sinks the ferry SS Caribou, killing 137.

18: Hitler issues Commando Order, ordering all captured commandos to be executed immediately.

Admiral William "Bull" Halsey is given command of the South Pacific naval forces.

21: Heavy RAF activity over El Alamein.

22: Conscription age in Britain reduced to 18.

American General Mark Clark secretly lands in Algeria to confer with Vichy officials and Resistance groups in preparation for impending Allied invasion.

British bombers target Genoa, Italy, destroying the airport and hitting the city center, residential areas, hospitals and churches.

23: Second Battle of El Alamein begins with massive Allied bombardment of German positions. Then Australian forces, mainly, begin advance while offshore British naval forces support the right flank (n.b. the ongoing concurrent victories being prepared at Guadalcanal and Stalingrad).

23: Battle for Henderson Field

24: US Navy Task Force 34, consisting of aircraft carriers, a variety of support ships, including troop ships and other vessels, set sail from Hampton Roads, Virginia with Patton's forces for Operation Torch, the landing in North Africa. The other two task forces of Operation Torch, the first American-led force to fight in the European and African theatres of war, depart Britain for Morocco.

Crisis at El Alamein: British tanks survive German 88 mm fire; Montgomery orders the advance to continue despite losses.

25: Rommel hurriedly returns from his sickbed in Germany to take charge of the African battle. (His replacement, General Stumme, had died of a heart attack).

The Japanese continue their attacks on the Marines west of Henderson Field.

26: The naval Battle of Santa Cruz. The Japanese lose many aircraft and have two aircraft carriers severely damaged. USS Hornet is sunk and USS Enterprise is damaged.

29: The Japanese continue to send troops as reinforcements into Guadalcanal.

In the United Kingdom, leading clergymen and political figures hold a public meeting to register outrage over Nazi Germany's persecution of Jews.

United States 1st Armored Division moves from Northern Ireland to England.

31: The British make a critical breakthrough with tanks west of El Alamein; Rommel's mine fields fail to stop the Allied armour.

== November ==
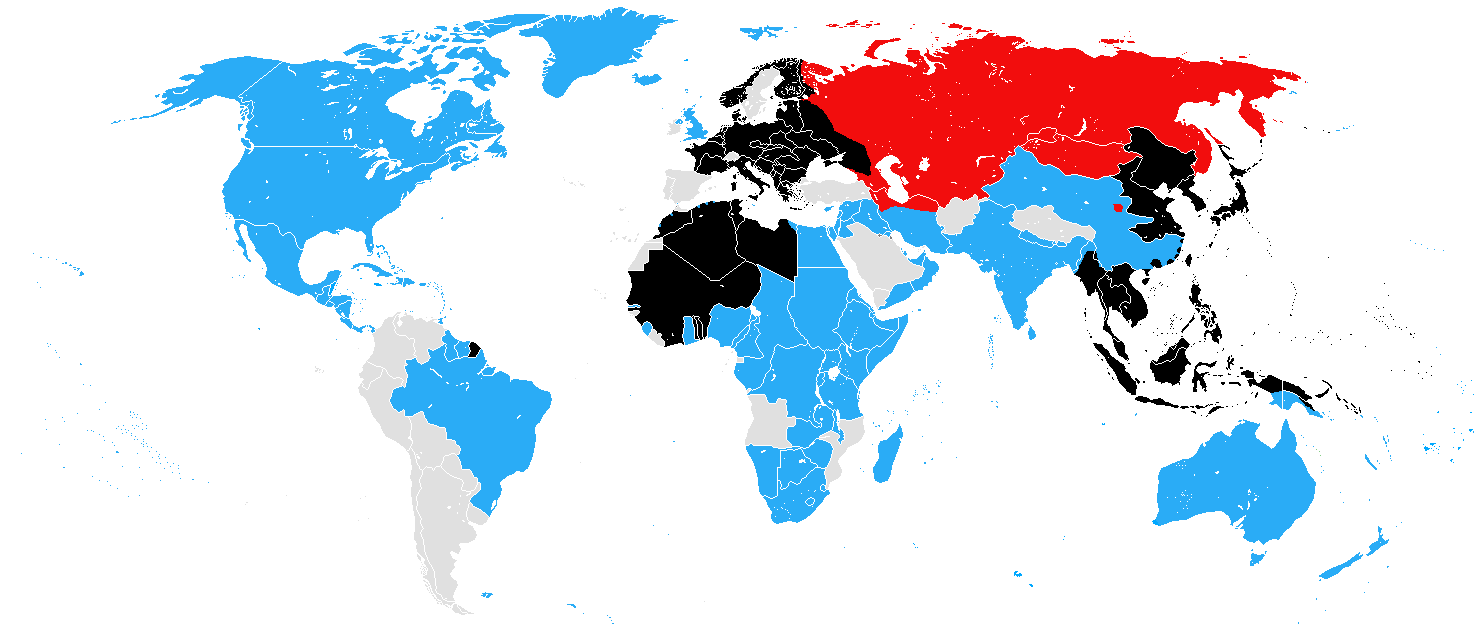
The state of the Allies and Axis powers in November 1942

1: Operation Supercharge, the Allied breakout at El Alamein, begins.

On Guadalcanal, the Americans begin the Matanikau Offensive against the Japanese.

3: Second Battle of El Alamein ends – German forces under Erwin Rommel are forced to retreat during the night.

American victory over the Japanese in Guadalcanal in the Koli Point action.

5: German III Panzer Corps and Romanian 2nd Mountain Division capture the town of Alagir, which is the furthest south the Axis would reach on the Eastern Front.

6: Carlson's Patrol begins.

8: Operation Torch, the Allied invasion of Vichy-controlled Morocco and Algeria, begins.

French resistance coup in Algiers, consisting of about 400 fighters neutralise the Vichyist XIXth Army Corps and the Vichyist generals (Juin, Darlan, etc.), contributing significantly to the immediate success of the operation.

The United States Combat Command "B" of the 1st Armored Division lands east and west of Oran as part of Operation Torch.

10: In violation of a 1940 armistice, Germany invades Vichy France; they are responding to the fact that French Admiral François Darlan has signed an armistice with the Allies in North Africa.

Oran, Algeria falls to US troops; 17 French ships are sunk at Oran, causing a rift between the French and the Allies. There are more Allied landings near the Tunisian border.

Montgomery begins a major British offensive beginning at Sollum on the Libya/Egypt border. The British reach Bardia on the 11th, Tobruk on the 12th, and Benghazi on the 18th.

Lieutenant General Montgomery is knighted and made a full General.

Churchill speaks: "This is not the end. It is not even the beginning of the end. But it is, perhaps, the end of the beginning."

11: Convoys reach Malta from Alexandria; an official announcement proclaims that the island is "relieved of its siege".

12: Battle of Guadalcanal – A climactic naval battle near Guadalcanal starts between Japanese and American naval forces.

The Red Army makes an attempt to relieve Stalingrad at Kotelnikov.

13: British Eighth Army recaptures Tobruk.

Battle of Guadalcanal: aviators from USS Enterprise sink the Japanese battleship Hiei. Notably, USS Juneau is sunk with much of its crew, including the five Sullivan brothers.

14: USS Washington attacks the Japanese battleship Kirishima; the Japanese ship would capsize at 03:25 on the morning of 15 November.

15: The naval battle of Guadalcanal ends. Although the United States Navy suffers heavy losses, it still retains control of the sea around Guadalcanal.

The British move westward to Tunisia.

British Eighth Army recaptures Derna.

17: Japanese send reinforcements into New Guinea; Americans are stymied at Buna.

18: Heavy British RAF raid on Berlin with few losses.

19: At Stalingrad the Soviet Union forces under General Georgy Zhukov launch Operation Uranus aimed at encircling the Germans in the city and thus turning the tide of battle in the USSR's favor.

20: The Allies take Benghazi, Libya; the Afrika Corps continues the retreat westward.

21: The Red Army attempt at encirclement of Stalingrad continues with obvious success.

American army moves to shove Japanese off the extreme western end of Guadalcanal.

22: Battle of Stalingrad: The situation for the German attackers of Stalingrad seems desperate during the Soviet counter-attack; General Friedrich Paulus sends Adolf Hitler a telegram saying that the German 6th Army is surrounded.

Red Army troops complete the encirclement of the Germans at Kalach, west of Stalingrad.

23: "Der Kessel"-- the Cauldron, a description of the heavy fighting at Stalingrad; Hitler orders General Paulus not to retreat, at any cost.

25: The encirclement of Stalingrad continues to stabilise. Hitler reiterates his demand of Paulus not to surrender.

Operation Harling: a team of British SOE agents, together with over 200 Greek guerrillas from both ELAS and EDES groups, blow up the Gorgopotamos railway bridge, in one of the war's biggest sabotage acts.

26: Hostilities erupt between the American and Australian soldiers in Brisbane. Fighting breaks out which results in fatalities, it is dubbed the Battle of Brisbane.

27: At Toulon, the French navy scuttles its ships (most notably Dunkerque and Strasbourg) and submarines to keep them out of German hands; the French have declined another option – to join the Allied fleets in North African waters.

29: The Allied offensive in Tunisia meets with only minimum success.

30: The naval Battle of Tassafaronga (off Guadalcanal); this is a night action in which Japanese naval forces sink one American cruiser and damage three others.

The Free French liberate the island of Réunion on the Indian Ocean from the Vichy regime.

== December ==
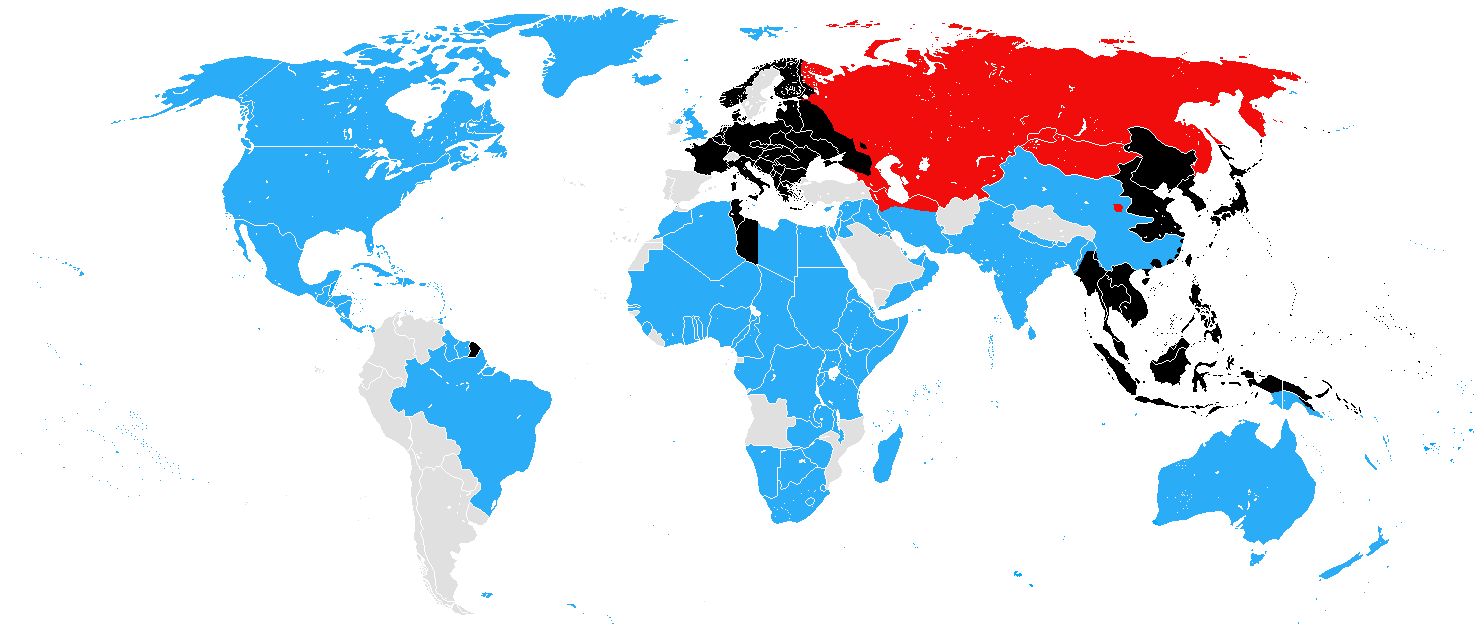
The state of the Allies and Axis powers in December 1942, showing Allied progress in Northern Africa

1: Gasoline rationing begins in the United States.

The US cruiser Northampton is sunk as Japanese destroyers attempt to come down "the Slot" to Guadalcanal.

Publication of the Beveridge Report in the United Kingdom on the post-war nature of social welfare

2: Heavy fighting in Tunisia, as German forces are pushed into the final North African corner.

Below the bleachers of Stagg Field at the University of Chicago, a team led by Enrico Fermi initiates the first nuclear chain reaction. A coded message, "The Italian navigator has landed in the new world" is sent to President Roosevelt.

4: The first US bombing of mainland Italy --Naples.

Carlson's patrol ends.

6: RAF bombs Eindhoven, the Netherlands.

7: On the anniversary of the Pearl Harbor attack, USS New Jersey, America's largest battleship is launched (commissioned five months later).

British commandos conduct Operation Frankton a raid on shipping in Bordeaux harbour.

9: The Marines turn over Guadalcanal to the American army.

12: Rommel abandons El Agheila and retreats to Tripoli; the final stand will be at the Mareth line in southern Tunisia.

In a large operation named "Operation Winter Storm", the Germans attempt to break through to forces trapped in Stalingrad.

13: The Luftwaffe flies in meagre supplies to the beleaguered Stalingrad troops.

15: American and Australian troops finally push Japanese out of Buna, New Guinea.

Allies clash with Japanese troops in the Battle of the Gifu.

17: Allied powers issue the Joint Declaration by Members of the United Nations which is the first declaration to condemn the Holocaust in German-occupied Europe in response to the first official report from the Polish government-in-exile on 10 December.

22: The Germans begin a retreat from the Caucasus.

The battle for "Longstop Hill" begins; a key position outside Tunis, the Germans eventually take it and hold it until April.

The remainder of the United States 1st Armored Division arrived at North Africa for Operation Husky.

23: Japanese air force planes begin bombing of Calcutta.

24: French Admiral Darlan, the former Vichy leader who had switched over to the Allies following the Torch landings, is assassinated in Algiers.

The United States reorganizes its Combat Arms Regiments with their Organic Battalions into Separate Groups and Battalions.

25: American bombers hit Rabaul.

26: Heavy fighting continues on Guadalcanal, now focused on Mount Austen in the west.

28: The governor of pro-Vichy French Somaliland surrenders to invading British and Free French forces.

31: In the Battle of the Barents Sea, the British win a strategic victory, leading Hitler to largely abandon the use of surface raiders in favor of U-boats.

As the year draws to a close, things look much brighter for the Allies than they did a few months ago: Rommel is trapped in Tunisia, the Germans are encircled at Stalingrad, and the Japanese appear ready to abandon Guadalcanal.

== See also ==
- Strategic operations of the Red Army in World War II
- Timeline of World War II (1943)
