= Inter-Allied Information Committee =

Allied counterpropaganda organisation of WW2

Agency overview
- Formed: September 24, 1940; 85 years ago
- Dissolved: November 1942; 83 years ago
- Superseding agencies: United Nations Information Board and Office; United Nations Information Organisation, UN Department of Public Information, United Nations Department of Global Communications,
- Headquarters: New York City, United States, and London, United Kingdom

The Inter-Allied Information Committee was a propaganda and counterpropaganda organisation created in 1940 in the USA.

During WWII, the Inter-Allied Information Committee was one of the organisations involved in drawing attention to the Holocaust. It later formed the basis of the United Nations Information Organisation and is a direct predecessor to the United Nations Department of Global Communications.

== History ==
=== Formation and purpose ===
The formation of the Inter-Allied Information Committee was promoted by Britain's ambassador to the United States, Lord Lothian and it first met on September 24, 1940. Its information centre was housed in the Rockefeller Center in New York City.

The committee was created as a means of distributing information about the Allied war effort against the Axis powers. By mid-1942, Belgium, Czechoslovakia, Free France, Luxembourg, the Netherlands, Norway, Poland, Australia, Greece, Yugoslavia, Denmark, China, Canada, India, New Zealand, and South Africa were all members of the organisation.

=== Distribution of Media ===
The Inter-Allied Information Committee included representatives from the United States Office of War Information and the Office of the Coordinator of Inter-American Affairs and helped to distribute propaganda films produced by the various Allied nations to the other nations.

=== Role in drawing attention to the Holocaust ===
The Holocaust in Nazi-occupied Poland as partially described in the Inter-Allied Information Committee's publication, Persecution of the Jews

In 1942, the Inter-Allied Information Committee produced a series of eight pamphlets on conditions in Occupied Europe, including Women under Axis rule, The Axis System of Hostages, Religious Persecution, Axis Oppression of Education, and The Penetration of German Capital into Europe.

The sixth pamphlet in the series, published on 18th December 1942 was entitled Persecution of the Jews and described the Holocaust in detail, including the transport of Jews to the East, their concentration into ghettos, and the subsequent systematic extermination, naming Chełmno extermination camp and Belzec extermination camp as places where "those who survive the shooting are murdered en masse by means of electrocution or lethal gas".

In 1943, in cooperation with the United Nations War Crimes Commission, the Inter-Allied Information Committee published several studies on war crimes and the Holocaust in German-occupied Europe, including Punishment for War Crimes.

A report of April 20, 1943 by the Inter-Allied Information Committee estimated that two million Jews had been murdered by the Germans and that five million more were in danger. It also publicised the actions of the Einsatzgruppen, and drew attention to the increasing scale and tempo of German atrocities, charging that they were part of a premeditated plan to "liquidate entire peoples".

However, when the Gerstein Report was delivered via the Dutch government-in-exile to the Inter-Allied Information Committee in 1943, the only response received was that the committee was being restructured, and the report was not published by the committee.

=== Basis of the United Nations Information Organisation ===
Poster produced by the United Nations Information Organisation

In July 1942, the United States joined the Inter-Allied Information Committee, and in November of 1942, the committee was renamed as the 'United Nations Information Board and Office'. The United Nations Information Board and Office was the first organisation to use 'United Nations' in its name.

Soon afterwards, all signatories to the Declaration of the United Nations were invited to join, and the name was changed again to the 'United Nations Information Organisation'. The location of the organisation continued to be the Rockefeller Center, and a New York Times article in 1943 stated that the newly formed organisation's General Secretary, William Bryant Mumford, had previously been General Secretary of the Inter-Allied Information Committee.

The purpose of the United Nations Information Organisation was stated to be "to provide a clearing house for information on the United Nations". and "to share public information on behalf of its Member States and showcase the work of the organisation itself".

After the founding of the United Nations at the San Francisco Conference in 1945, the functions of the United Nations Information Organisation were assumed by the UN's Department of Public Information, today known as the United Nations Department of Global Communications, which makes the Inter-Allied Information Committee its direct precursor.

== Characterisation ==
Thomas Mahl described the Inter-Allied Information Committee's purpose as allowing "British propaganda to emerge from Czech or Polish or French lips". William Mumford's son, David described the committee as "essentially a propaganda organisation which worked hard to explain to Americans what was going on in Europe".

However in 1942, Harold Butler, supervisor of British publications in the United States, defined the purpose of the Inter-Allied Information Committee as counterpropaganda:

"...to fight back, to nail every lie as soon as it appears, to warn our peoples all the time against being fooled by the enemy. Every slander spread against an ally is a trick won by Hitler. Every doubt raised as to the resolution or integrity of an ally plays into his hands. These things begin by weakening morale at home and from there it is bound to spread to the man in the field. I believe that this Inter-Allied Information Committee can do a lot to scotch the German viper."

== See also ==
- International response to the Holocaust
- Joint Declaration by Members of the United Nations
- Riegner Telegram
