= William Bryant Mumford =

William Bryant Mumford (1900–1951) was a British educationist, particularly involved with British colonial Africa. At the end of his life he worked for the United Nations.

== Early life ==
He was born in Manchester, the son of the medical man Alfred Alexander Mumford (1862–1943) and his wife Edith Emily Reid, who had read mathematics at Girton College, Cambridge. He was educated at Manchester Grammar School, and passed out at Keyham College after one year in 1918. He himself took the Mathematical Tripos, at St John's College, Cambridge, where he rowed, with three years to M.A. in 1921. He then undertook post-graduate teaching training.

== Educator in Tanganyika ==
Mumford encountered Stanley Rivers-Smith (1877–1965), Director of Education in the Tanganyika Territory from 1920 to 1931, who was recruiting in Britain. Before leaving for Africa, Mumford visited the archaeologist Henry Balfour in Oxford.

In the Colonial Service 1923 to 1933, from July 1923 Mumford was an Inspector of Education for Tanganyika; and from October that year an assistant master with a teaching post. He was the founder and first headmaster of Malangali Boys' School, later Malangali Secondary School; its principles, influenced by Rivers-Smith, differed by conscious design from Tabora Boys Secondary School, which followed the British public school model. Mumford aimed at a broader base of African pupils. From 1928 Mumford imitated traditional training given in the Hehe people and Sangu people, to pages destined for court. African elders were employed, and student dress was from the late 19th century. Recreation was traditional in dance and spear-throwing.

== Academia ==
In 1930 Mumford was awarded a Ph.D. by the University of Toronto, where he had lectured on psychology and anthropology. In 1932–3 he was at Yale University as a Carnegie Corporation Fellow in Education, and was given for the following year a research assistant position in race relations.

Mumford moved in 1933/4 to London, to become in due course head of the colonial department at the University of London Institute of Education. The department was the idea of Fred Clarke, who took over as Director of the Institute in 1936 from Percy Nunn. There was an "oversea section", from 1932 to 1935 funded by the Carnegie Corporation. The plan was that Mumford would work closely with the anthropologist Bronislaw Malinowski of the LSE and IIALC. In that direction Mumford was in 1937 co-opted to the Standing Committee on Applied Anthropology of the Royal Anthropological Institute of Great Britain and Ireland.

Mumford was able to build the new department up, in terms of its library and research and information section, with the help of the May Esther Bedford Fund set up by his wife. The department in the later 1930s included Gerwyn Elidor David (G. E. D.) Lewis with a diploma from the School of Oriental Studies, who went to Malaya in 1938; and the South African lawyer Julius Lewin working as a research assistant.

The successor to Mumford in 1940 was Margaret Read, working part-time.

== United Nations Information Office ==
In early summer 1940 Mumford took part in the Dunkirk evacuation. Later that year he was recruited to the Inter-Allied Information Committee, described by his son David as "essentially a propaganda organization which worked hard to explain to Americans what was going on in Europe". He became secretary-general of the United Nations Information Office (UNIO) in New York, and moved with his family to the United States. A New York Times article of 1943 explained that the UNIO represented 19 allied governments, and that Mumford had worked first in London with the same title for the Inter-Allied Information Office.

In 1945 Mumford wrote to Richard B. Moore on behalf of Alger Hiss, about Chapter XII of the United Nations Charter. With the United Nations post of Director of Special Services in the Department of Public Information, Mumford's remit was education and liaison with NGOs.

== Death and legacy ==
William Bryant Mumford died on 28 January 1951. The Bryant Mumford Memorial Fellowship was established in his memory, the first winner in 1954 being J. B. Danquah. The Memorial Fund's administrator was the entomologist Edward Philpott Mumford (1902–1977), his younger brother.

== Works ==
- Island India Goes to School, a study of education in the Dutch East Indies (1934), with Edwin Embree and Margaret Sargent Simon. This report was backed by the Institute of Pacific Relations and the Dutch government, and was funded by the Rosenwald Foundation, of which Embree was president, and the Carnegie Corporation.
- Africans Learn to be French (1935), with Granville Orde Browne, later adviser on Colonial Labour to the Secretary of State for the Colonies.
- Native Education: Ceylon, Java, Formosa, the Philippines, French Indo-China, and British Malaya (1935)
- Education in British African Dependencies: A Review of the 1935 Annual Reports on Native Education in Nyasaland, N. Rhodesia, Tanganyika, Uganda, Gold Coast, Nigeria and Sierra Leone (1937), with B. N. Parker. Bertram Noel Parker (1892–1982) of the Institute of Education collaborated with Mumford. After service in World War I, he had added in 1919 B.A. (London) to previous study at the University of Paris. In 1935/6 Parker joined the staff and became part of the team working on TEFL and speech training. He also worked with Mumford on textbooks in Basic English. The Basic Way to English by C. K. Ogden, volumes appearing from 1937, had Mumford as Colonial Adviser.

=== Ethnography and anthropology ===
- The Hehe-Bena-Sangu Peoples of East Africa (1934) The Malangali school was in Mufindi District, where much of the population was Hehe or Sangu.
- Racial Comparisons and Intelligence Testing (1938), with C. E. White. The subtitle was "Some Notes on Psychological and Anthropometrical Studies of African and European Differences: A Corrective to Some Popular Opinions". Clarence Ebblewhite Smith (1906–1980) was a research assistant in the Institute in the late 1930s; he was later at the University of Manitoba. Helen Tilley commented that the paper depended heavily in parts on the African Survey published the same year, on which Mumford had advised.
- Africa holds her own, with Edmund Hugh Ashton and Z. K. Matthews

== Family ==
Mumford married in 1933 Grace Schiott. She had married, firstly in 1931, John Embree, son of Edwin Embree. He married in 1932 Ella Lury. Grace was the daughter of Johannes Schiott of Greens Farms, Connecticut, and E. T. Bedford was her maternal grandfather. The couple had five children, three sons including David Mumford the mathematician, and two daughters.
