= Frederick Ross =

Frederick, Fred or Freddie Ross may refer to:

== People ==
- Frederick Augustus Ross (1796–1883), American Presbyterian clergyman
  - Frederick Ross's Corner, a column attacking Ross in Brownlow's Whig
- Sir Frederick Leith-Ross (Frederick William Leith Ross, 1887–1968), chief economic adviser to the UK government, 1932–1945
- Fred Ross (community organizer) (1910–1992), American community organizer
- Fred Ross, American businessman and leader of the Art Renewal Center
- Fred Ross, father of American singer Diana Ross
- Fred Ross, Genesee County Sheriff's Deputy featured in the Michael Moore documentary Roger & Me
- Freddie Ross, American musician who performs under the stage name Big Freedia
- Fred Ross (American football), wide receiver for the Mississippi State Bulldogs

== Fiction ==
- Frederick Ross, a character on the American sitcom Woops!, played by Cleavant Derricks
