= Punishment for War Crimes =

1942 declaration from several Allied governments-in-exile

Third Inter-Allied Conference Punishment for War Crimes
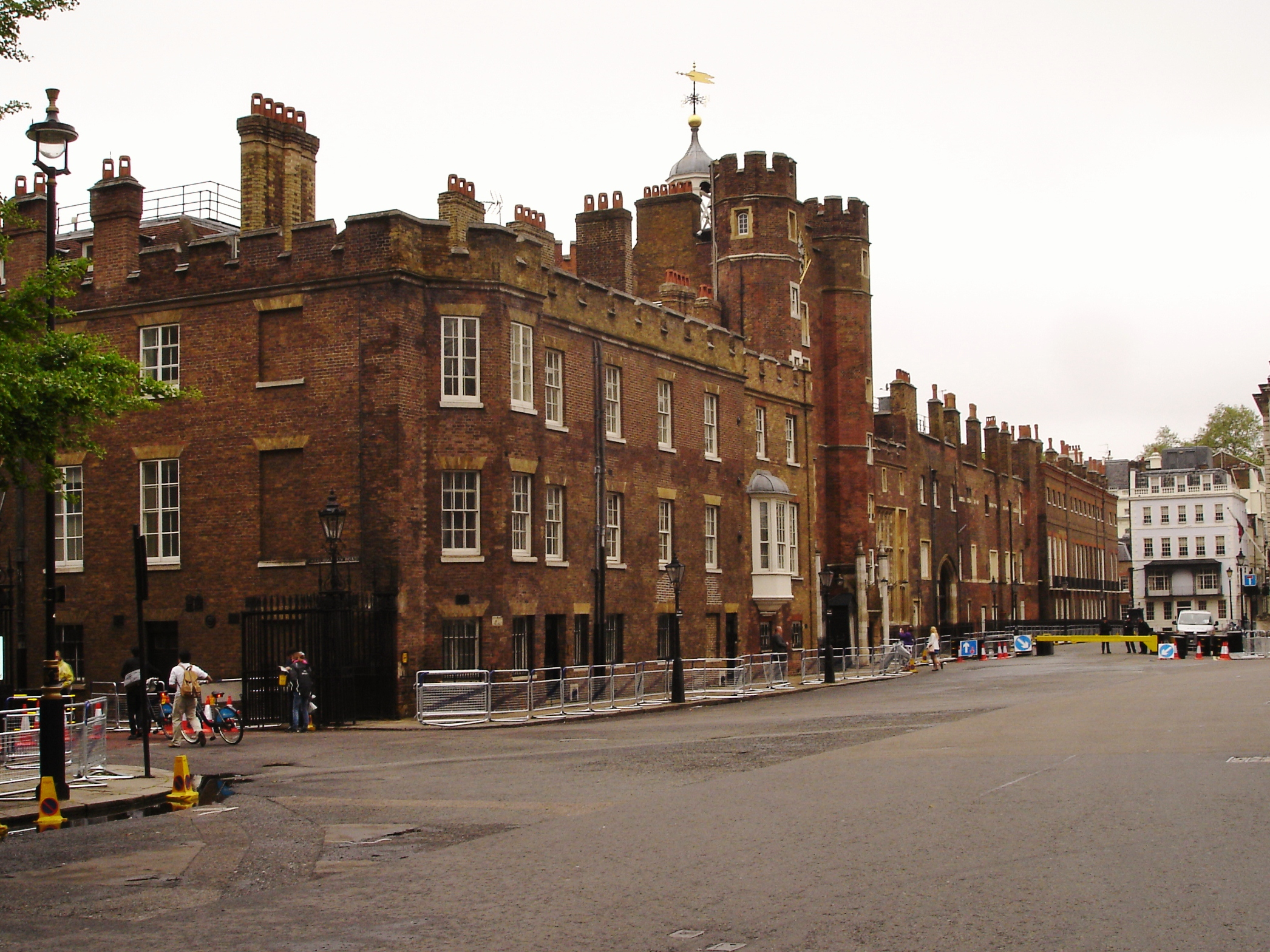
- St James' Palace, pictured in 2012
- Host country: United Kingdom
- Date: 13 January 1942
- Cities: London
- Venues: St James's Palace
- Participants: Belgian government in exile Czechoslovak provisional government-in-exile Greek government-in-exile Luxembourg government-in-exile Dutch government-in-exile Norwegian government-in-exile Polish government-in-exile Yugoslav government-in-exile (Free France) Free French National Committee
- Chair: Władysław Sikorski

Punishment for War Crimes was the title of a declaration issued by the representatives of eight Allied governments-in-exile and the Free French at the third Inter-Allied Conference at St James's Palace in London, United Kingdom, on 13 January 1942. It has been described as the "first milestone" towards the creation of an international legal framework for the prosecution of war crimes in German-occupied Europe during World War II.

== Declaration ==
The declaration agreed at the meeting on 13 January 1942 was signed by the Belgian, Czechoslovak, Dutch, Greek, Luxembourg, Norwegian, and Yugoslav governments in exile as well as the Free French National Committee. Representatives of the British government attended the meeting as observers together with representatives from Canada, Australia, New Zealand, and South Africa. Although noting that the declaration was chiefly symbolic and could not be enforced, the historian Julia Eichenberg notes that "it was the first to formulate a new and jointly Allied attitude towards the prosecution of war crimes, setting them on the agenda of all further discussions between the Allied governments and making them central to all declared war aims and peace plans". The declaration stated that the Allied governments "placed among their principal war aims the punishment, through the channel of organized justice, of those guilty of or responsible for these crimes, whether they have ordered them, perpetrated them or participated in them".

The declaration did not make any specification about the "character, race, or religion of the victim" and made no reference to the persecution of specific minority groups such as Jews. It was only in December 1942 that the Holocaust was condemned in the Joint Declaration by Members of the United Nations.

The declaration was formally presented to the British, American, and Soviet governments as a diplomatic note verbale. These felt obliged to respond with their own declarations affirming their desire to establish legal accountability for war crimes after the war. The declaration contributed to the establishment of an Inter-Allied Commission on the Punishment of War Crimes under the auspices of the London International Assembly with Michał Potulicki as secretary-general which met regularly until it was superseded by the United Nations War Crimes Commission (UNWCC) in October 1943. In conjunction with the Inter-Allied Information Committee, it published a number of studies on aspects of German policy in German-occupied Europe.

== See also ==
- Diplomatic history of World War II
- List of Allied World War II conferences
