= Fred Ross Jr. =

Labor organizer (1947–2022)

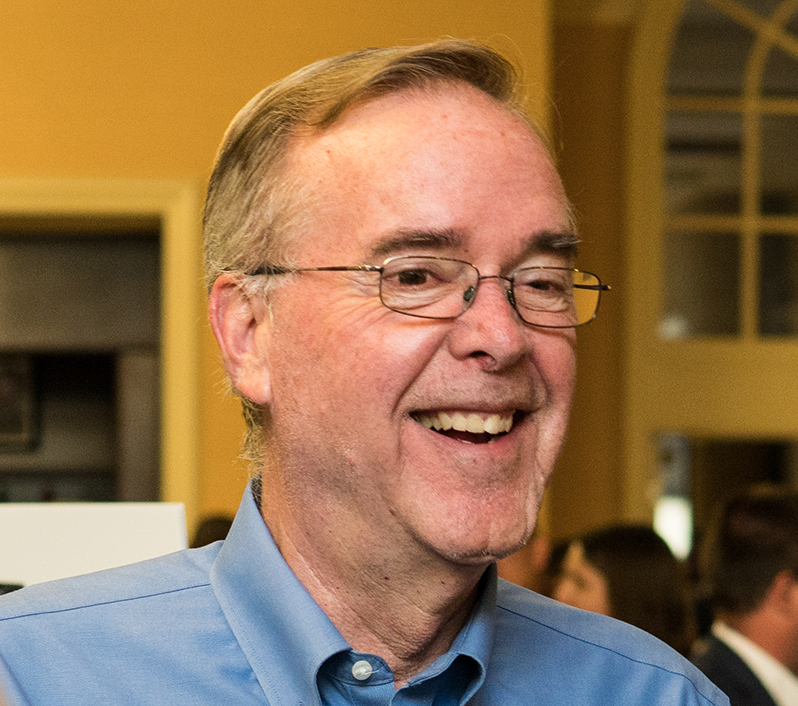
Fred Ross Jr., California labor and political organizer

Fred Ross Jr. (1947 – November 20, 2022) was a labor and political organizer in California, working closely with the United Farm Workers (UFW) and other progressive causes.

== Early life and education ==
Ross was born in Long Beach, California, in 1947 to Fred and Frances Ross. He grew up in Boyle Heights, and Spanish was his primary language. He graduated from Redwood High School (Marin County). He attended the University of California, Berkeley and graduated in 1970. He also graduated with a law degree from University of San Francisco Law School in 1983. His father was an active community organizer in California, known for his work with the UFW.

== Farmworkers and other labor groups ==
Ross joined his father's work with the UFW after graduating from college in 1970. He worked with Dolores Huerta and Cesar Chavez alongside his father. In 1971 he spearheaded farm worker campaigns in Oregon and Washington. In early 1975, he organized a march support of in farm workers. The march from Union Square in San Francisco to the Modesto company headquarters of Gallo wines gathered between 15,000 and 20,000 farm workers and covered 115 miles.

Ross Jr. also worked in other areas of labor organizing. He worked in Los Angeles as a community organizer with Industrial Areas Foundation in the mid-1990s. Later he organized health care and service workers at the SEIU and utility workers at IBEW 1245.

== Political organizing ==
Ross was considered a key player in the election of Nancy Pelosi in 1987 in a special election in San Francisco. He later served as the district director in Pelosi's local San Francisco office while she served in Congress.

He founded Neighbor to Neighbor, a grassroots non-profit organization that opposed the Reagan-era support for policies in Nicaragua and El Salvador. To put pressure on the US government, Ross Jr. organized picket lines to discourage the unloading of Salvadoran coffee in California ports.

== Personal life ==
Ross was married to Margo Feinberg, a labor attorney. They had two children, Charley and Helen.
