= American Council of Race Relations =

African-American civil rights organization

- Abbreviation: ACRR
- Formation: January 10, 1946
- Type: NGO
- Legal status: Closed
- Purpose: Civil rights
- Headquarters: Chicago
- Region served: United States
- Leader: Edwin Embree

The American Council of Race Relations, or ACRR, was a short-lived, highly influential nonprofit organization in the United States that operated from 1944 to 1950. With a stated goal to "to bring about full democracy in race relations," they sought to "create unity, and end the riots… between whites and minorities" while functioning as the country's first professional clearinghouse for civil rights strategy. For its role in history, the ACRR is regarded a critical bridge between reactive, localized committees in the early 20th century and the organized, national civil rights movement that would flourish in the 1950s.

== Roots of ACRR ==
In 1943, it was observed that while the National Association for the Advancement of Colored People (NAACP) focused on legal battles and the National Urban League focused on employment, there was no organization dedicated to the administrative and social engineering aspects of race relations. A race riot in Detroit in 1943 resulted in 34 deaths and required federal troops to restore order. In the same timeframe, unrest occurred in Harlem and Los Angeles.

== Formation, Operations and Closure ==
With support from Marshall Field III, Edwin Embree founded the American Council on Race Relations in Chicago in 1944. Functioning as a professional service agency and consultancy, the ACRR used data to dismantle segregation and prevent violence by applying social science to social planning. It acted like a headquarters for hundreds of local "human relations commissions" that were springing up in cities across the United States. Providing local mayors and committees with training manuals, riot-prevention strategies, and administrative guidance, the council also developed "community audits" that allowed cities to measure discrimination in housing and employment quantitatively to persuade business leaders that segregation was economically inefficient. That project was led by University of Chicago sociologist Louis Wirth.

The ACRR dissolved in 1950. That year, the Rosenwald Fund spent down its endowment. Along with that, the American political climate became hostile toward social planning organizations. However, ACRR's work was institutionalized because of the work they had accomplished. Before disbanding, the ACRR helped establish the National Association of Intergroup Relations Officials or NAIRO in 1947, effectively creating the professional field of government diversity and inclusion.

== Influence and Legacy ==
During its brief existence, the ACRR exerted significant influence on American culture and policy. It actively lobbied the entertainment industry including pressuring major film studios in Hollywood and radio networks to abandon racial caricatures in favor of dignified portrayals of African Americans. The council is also credited with playing a decisive background role in federal policy. When President Harry S. Truman established the President's Committee on Civil Rights, the ACRR provided much of the sociological data and research underpinning a historic 1947 report called "To Secure These Rights." This report later served as the blueprint for the federal civil rights legislation of the 1960s.

== Bibliography ==
The ACRR created a number of important publications, including:

- Directory of agencies in intergroup relations: national, regional, state and local. 1849–1949. (1948) Chicago: American Council on Race Relations. Also published by Julius Rosenwald Fund.
- American Council on Race Relations: Intergroup relations in San Diego : some aspects of community life in San Diego which particularly affect minority groups, with recommendations for a program of community action. (1946) Chicago: American Council on Race Relations. Also published by Julius Rosenwald Fund.
- Studies in reduction of prejudice; a memorandum summarizing research on modification of attitudes. (1947) Chicago: American Council on Race Relations. Also published by Arnold Marshall Rose.

== See also ==
- Civil rights movement (1896–1954)
- History of civil rights in the United States
- List of civil rights leaders
- Timeline of the civil rights movement
