= United Nations War Crimes Commission =

Commission investigating allegations of war crime

History
- Founded: October 20, 1943
- Disbanded: 1948

The United Nations War Crimes Commission (UNWCC), initially the United Nations Commission for the Investigation of War Crimes, was a United Nations body that aided the prosecution of war crimes committed by Nazi Germany and other Axis powers during World War II.

Operating from 1943 to 1948, the UNWCC was mandated to identify and record war crimes; prepare indictments; ensure suspected war criminals were arrested; determine the legal basis for extradition and punishment; and help define crimes against humanity and the crime of genocide. It registered over 36,000 suspected war criminals and opened over 8,000 cases. The Commission did not adjudicate war crimes itself, but rather advised, supervised, and coordinated with Allied states to conduct their own trials. The UNWCC also called for the creation of the International Military Tribunal at Nuremberg and other courts to adjudicate war crimes, and its research and expertise were subsequently utilized in support of these judicial bodies.

The creation of the UNWCC is considered a landmark in the history of international law. It formulated the legal principles and procedures that would underpin international criminal law.

== History ==
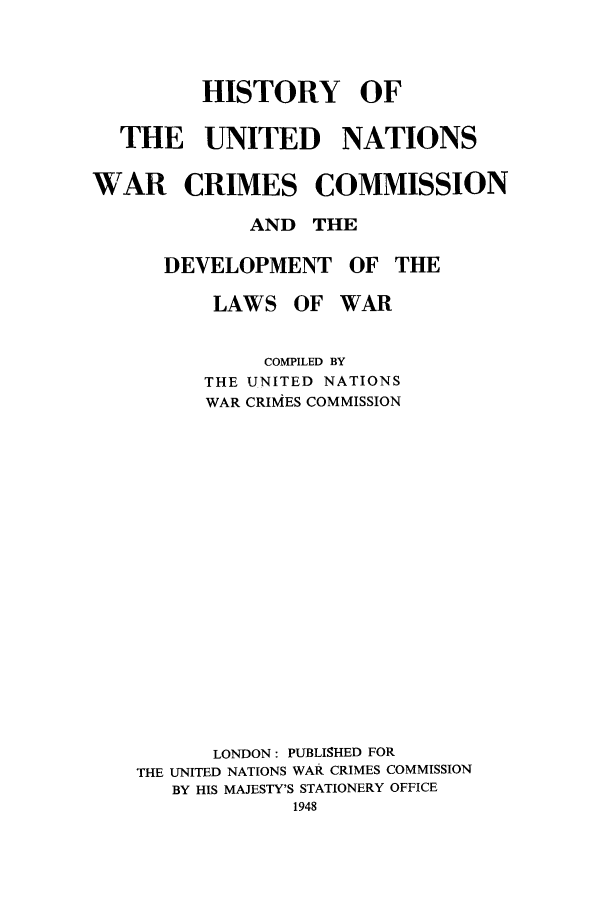
Front cover of the History of the United Nations War Crimes Commission

The UNWCC was proposed by Lord Chancellor John Simon in the British House of Lords on 7 October 1942, in parallel to a similar statement issued by the United States government the same day.

The proposal is to set up with the least possible delay a United Nations Commission for the Investigation of War Crimes.

The Commission will be composed of nationals of the United Nations, selected by their Governments. The Commission will investigate war crimes committed against nationals of the United Nations recording the testimony available, and the Commission will report from time to time to the Governments of those nations cases in which such crimes appear to have been committed, naming and identifying wherever possible the persons responsible. The Commission should direct its attention in particular to organized atrocities. Atrocities perpetrated by or on the orders of Germany in Occupied France should be included.

The investigation should cover war crimes of offenders irrespective of rank, and the aim will be to collect material, supported wherever possible by depositions or by other documents, to establish such crimes, especially where they are systematically perpetrated, and to name and identify those responsible for their perpetration.

— Lord Chancellor John Simon at the House of Lords on 7 October 1942.

The commission was formally established roughly a year later, on 20 October 1943, at a meeting held at the British Foreign Office in London; it was supported by the governments of seventeen Allied nations: Australia, Belgium, Canada, China, Czechoslovakia, France, (Note: Technically the French provisional government, formally known as the French Committee of National Liberation.) Greece, India, Luxembourg, the Netherlands, New Zealand, Norway, Poland, South Africa, the United Kingdom, the United States, and Yugoslavia. The UNWCC preceded the formal establishment of the United Nations in 1945.

== Functions and activities ==
The commission's objectives and powers were conferred as follows:

1. It should investigate and record the evidence of war crimes, identifying where possible the individuals responsible.
2. It should report to the Governments concerned cases in which it appeared that adequate evidence might be expected to be forthcoming.

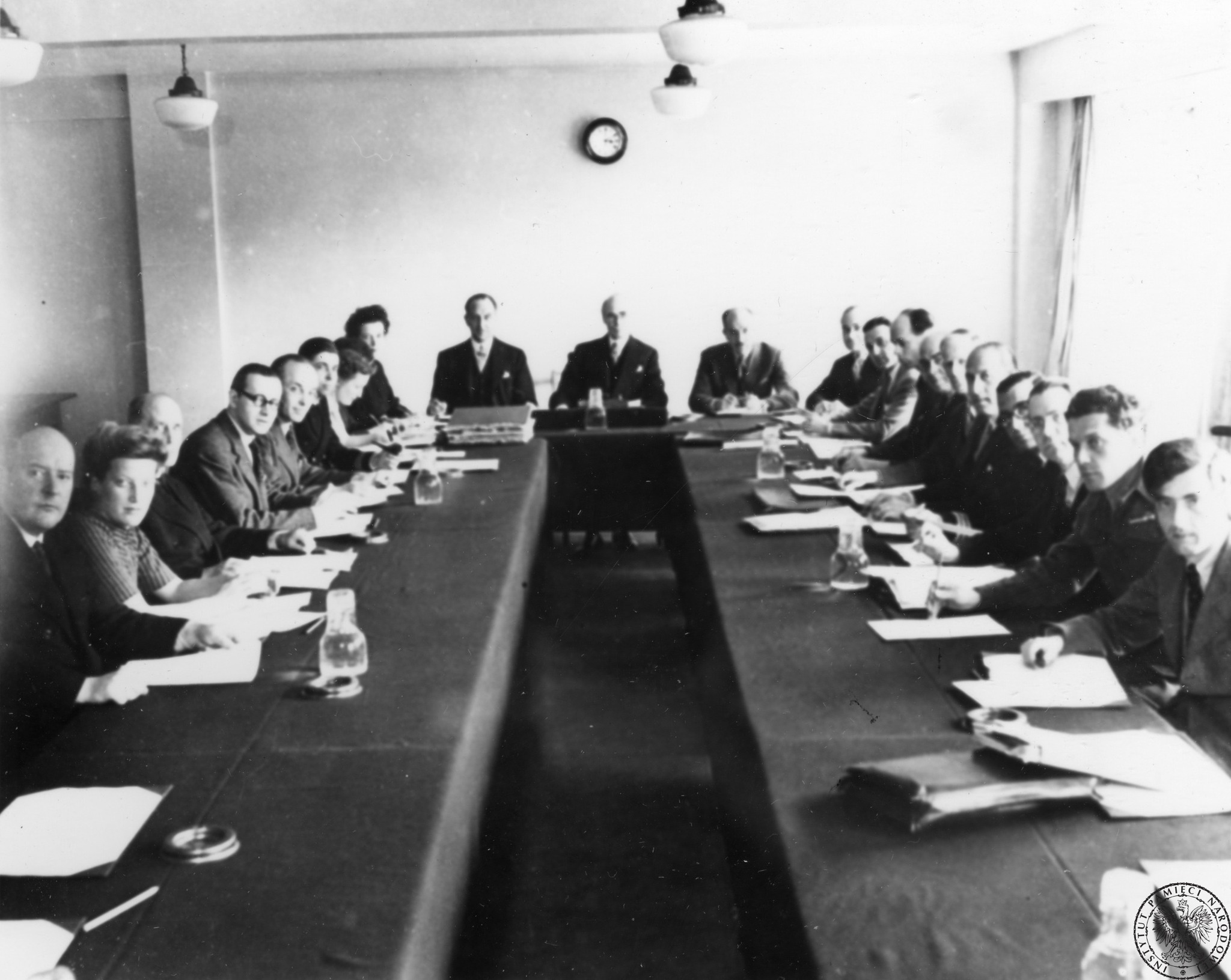
Members of the United Nations War Crimes Commission

One of the commission's main tasks was to carefully collect evidence of war crimes for the arrest and fair trial of alleged Axis war criminals. After the war, Centers of Documentation of Nazi War Crimes were established throughout Germany to support its research and activities. However, the commission had no power to prosecute criminals by itself. It merely reported back to the government members of the UN. These governments then could convene tribunals, such as the Nuremberg International Military Tribunal and the International Military Tribunal for the Far East. The commission was headed by Cecil Hurst from 1943 to 1945, then by Lord Wright until 1948 before being dissolved in 1949.

According to British academic Dan Plesch, Adolf Hitler was put on the UNWCC's first list of war criminals in December 1944, after determining that Hitler could be held criminally responsible for the acts of the Nazis in occupied countries. By March 1945, a month before Hitler's death, "the commission had endorsed at least seven separate indictments against him for war crimes."

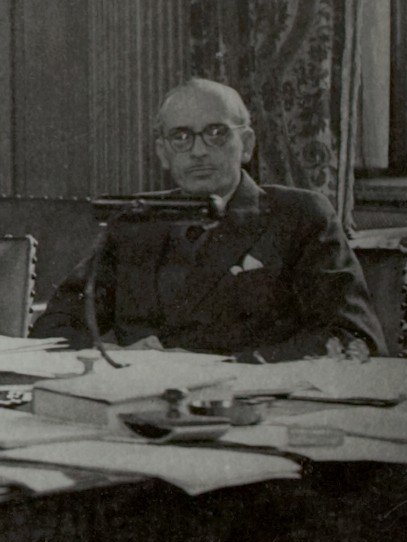
Cecil Hurst, 1945

Vahagn Avedian states that the designation of the subsequent report as "restricted" might explain why it is relatively unknown in the literature and has been overlooked in many relevant discussions about e.g. Crimes Against Humanity, the UN Genocide Convention and their applicability on historical cases. One such highly debated case is the Armenian Genocide, both within the scholarly and the political communities, but also in regard to the conducted UN Genocide studies: the 1973 Ruhashyankiko Report and the 1985 Whitaker Report.

The UNWCC report dedicated an entire chapter to the historical background of the term "Crimes Against Humanity", a new indictment beside the existing "Crimes Against Peace" and "War crime ". The seven-page historical background used mainly the Armenian massacres during World War I and the findings of the 1919 Commission of Responsibilities to substantiate the usage of the term Crimes Against Humanity as a precedent for the Nuremberg Charter's Article 6, in turn being the basis for the impending review of the UN Genocide Convention.

Considering the controversies surrounding both the Ruhashyankiko Report and the Whitaker Report, in which the Armenian case played a pivotal role, Avedian notes that the UNWCC Report were seemingly unknown to the entire Sub-Commission on Prevention of Discrimination and Protection of Minorities, including Nicodème Ruhashyankiko and Ben Whitaker (politician) and could have been a highly significant resource in justifying respective Rapporteur's arguments.

== See also ==
- Punishment for War Crimes
