= Edwin Embree =

Edwin Rogers Embree (1883–1950) was an author and one of the former vice presidents of the Rockefeller Foundation, president of the Julius Rosenwald Foundation (also known as the Rosenwald Fund), a writer, and president of the Liberian Foundation. He is considered by many as one of the most influential philanthropists. He died in 1950.

== Early life ==
Embree was born in Nebraska in 1883, the youngest of four children of Laura and William Norris Embree. His grandfather and grandmother were John Gregg Fee and Matilda Fee, abolitionist leaders from Kentucky. Embree had a very close relationship with his grandfather, the founder and president of Berea College. His father was discharged from the Union Army, after he took a job as a telegrapher with the Union Pacific Railroad. His father died in 1891, so his mother took her four children and moved with her parents to Berea. Embree's grandfather John Fee formed Embree's values and character at an early age, so he followed his grandfather examples.

== Education ==
Embree attended Berea Academy when he was growing up. He later attended and graduated from Berea College, then enrolled in Yale where he graduated with an advance degree in philosophy. He later worked at Yale for 10 years in alumni affairs.

== Accomplishments ==
In 1917, Embree joined the Rockefeller staff in New York as secretary (1917–1924), then as director of the Division of Studies (1925–1927), and later as one of three vice presidents. He also traveled to Japan several times while working with Rockefeller.

In 1927 he became president of the Julius Rosenwald Foundation (also known as the Rosenwald Fund) until the program closed, as planned, in 1948. During his tenure he worked with Julius Rosenwald to create the Rosenwald Fellowship program, whereby promising Negroes and white Southerners were provided scholarships or grants of between $1000 to $2000 to enable them to further their education and/or research, whether for a PhD, graduate work, or post graduate studies. During the 20 years of the program 1537 fellowships were awarded, 999 to Negroes and 538 to white Southerners, for an investment totaling $1,655,000. In 1949 he published a detailed book, Investment in People : The Story of the Julius Rosenwald Fund, explaining the rationale behind the Julius Rosenwald Fund, how it worked and dispersed funds, with a detailed list of recipients.

He was deeply influenced by the interning of Japanese US citizens during World War II and became active in the Japanese American Citizens League (JACL). He became chairman of the Commission on Race Relations in Chicago and was co-founder of the American Council on Race Relations.

When the Rosenwald foundation closed, he became president of the Liberian Foundation.

Embree also wrote a handful of books. Brown America "The Story of a New Race" 1931. "Indians of the Americas" 1939. American Negroes "A Handbook" 1942. “Brown Americans: The Story of a Tenth of the Nation” 1943. "13 Against the Odds" 1944.
