= Fred Ross (community organizer) =

American activist (1910–1992)

Fred Ross Sr.
- Born: June 9, 1910; San Francisco, California, U.S.
- Died: May 31, 1992 (aged 81); San Rafael, California, U.S.
- Education: University of Southern California
- Occupation: Community organizer · Civil rights leader · Educator
- Years active: 1930s–1992
- Organizations: Community Service Organization; Industrial Areas Foundation; United Farm Workers
- Known for: Founder and lead organizer of Community Service Organization (CSO); mentor to Cesar Chávez and Dolores Huerta; pioneer of Alinsky-style grassroots organizing
- Children: 3, including Fred Jr.

Fred Ross Sr. (1910 – 1992) was an American community organizer. He founded the Community Service Organization (CSO) in 1948, which, with the support of the Industrial Areas Foundation, organized Mexican Americans in California. The CSO in San Jose, CA gave a young Cesar Chavez his first training in organizing, which he would later use in founding the United Farm Workers. Ross also trained the young Dolores Huerta in community organizing.

Along with Edward Roybal, Antonio Rios and other Mexican-Americans, Ross formed the CSO in East Los Angeles; Roybal became its first President. This chapter of the CSO became politically active and helped to elect Roybal to the City Council of Los Angeles in 1949, the first Mexican-American to serve as such since the 19th century.

== Background ==
Fred Ross Sr. was born in San Francisco in 1910 and was raised in Los Angeles in the Echo Park area. He earned a general secondary teaching credential from the University of Southern California in 1936. However, because of the Great Depression, he could not find employment. In 1937, Ross received a position with the state relief administration doing social work. After quitting his caseworker job, Ross worked for the Farm Security Administration, which was in charge of relief programs in the Coachella Valley.

== Experience in organizing ==
In John Steinbeck's famous novel The Grapes of Wrath, Steinbeck describes the journey and tribulations of the Joad family, a group of migrants looking for work in California. He describes a migrant labor camp that was based on a real camp in Arvin. Fred Ross Sr. was placed in charge of this camp shortly after Steinbeck left the area. Ross was later promoted to cover about 25 camps similar to this one all over California and Arizona. In the camps, Ross saw the poverty and poor working conditions experienced by the workers. He found in his heart the desire to organize, and he did so by earning the trust of the workers and beginning a form of self-government in the camp so that the workers could band together and fight to improve their conditions. He encouraged them to speak up and be heard, despite the fear of confrontation with power holders.

After the war, Ross worked for the American Council of Race Relations, whose stated goal was to "create unity, and end the riots... between whites and minorities." Ross spearheaded Civic Unity Leagues in Southern California's conservative Citrus Belt, bringing Mexican Americans and Blacks together to battle racial segregation. In Orange County, parents organized by Ross won a pivotal lawsuit (Mendez v. Westminster School District) in 1947 that paved the way for the Supreme Court's landmark 1954 Brown v. Board of Education decision that ordered an end to segregation of public schools in the United States. Ross obtained the support of Saul Alinsky, a well-known community organizer and head of the Industrial Areas Foundation, based in Chicago. In September 1947, Alinsky hired Ross to organize Mexican-Americans in Los Angeles. He organized in Southern California for six years before moving on to San Jose, which was the largest Latino center in the state outside of Los Angeles.

== Voter registration ==
Ross worked on voter registration in Riverside County, in the town of Belltown, where there was a segregation problem in the public schools. The Mexican and African-American children were all attending one school and the Anglo children were picked up by a bus and taken to another school. There was a bond election to provide funding to fix the predominantly Anglo school, but there was to be no money spent on the other school. The mainly Hispanic area was the Casa Blanca barrio, but their city council representative was an orange grower that refused to visit the people and address their grievances because of previous worker strikes against him. Ross, alongside numerous NAACP workers, registered voters in this area and unified the Hispanic community to vote against the orange grower in the city council election. Belltown eventually integrated the schools and the bonds passed. After this experience, Ross began to believe in the success of his type of organization. From then on, Ross and the CSO established two broad-based programs wherever they went – voter registration and citizenship classes.

== House-meeting organizing ==
It was during his organizing in Southern California that Ross developed the house-meeting technique that he would soon teach to Cesar Chavez; it would become the hallmark tactic of the UFW. Although many sources state Saul Alinsky trained Ross and Chavez, Ross claimed that it was not true. He said, "I'd been at it over a year before I met him." The house-meeting technique involved about a three-week period in which Ross would hold small house meetings to build up to one large organizing meeting to set up temporary officers. Then there would be more house meetings for several more weeks to lead up to another larger meeting to set up a working CSO chapter.

== Cesar Chavez, Dolores Huerta, and Fred Ross Jr. ==
Fred Ross Sr. trained a myriad of successful organizers during his lifetime. The most renowned of these organizers are Cesar Chavez, Dolores Huerta, and his son, Fred Ross Jr. Ross recruited Cesar while he was in San Jose; at first when Ross Sr. visited Chavez at his home, he was doubtful of his intentions. However, he soon saw that Ross was a man whose life calling was to help people in need. Chavez believed in Ross's technique and after their first house meeting, he accepted Ross's offer to join the CSO. That night, Ross wrote in his journal, "I think I found the guy I'm looking for." Ross continued to be an advisor and confidant to Chavez for the remainder of his life even when Chavez split from the CSO and began his own union.

Another young and intelligent organizer that Ross recruited was Dolores Huerta. She met him in Fresno in 1955. He showed her pictures of mobilized workers in Los Angeles and she knew she wanted to be a part of this organization. She began working with CSO in Stockton, helping run civic and educational programs. She soon met Chavez and so began their lifelong friendship and coalition to organize farmworkers. When Chavez decided to form his own union, the UFW, Huerta was shocked. However, "when the initial shock wore off, I thought it was exciting," said Huerta. Huerta would be a main organizer and leader in the UFW until 2000.

Fred Ross also trained Ellie Cohen in the housemeeting method around nuclear weapons proliferation that she developed into a swing congressional district grassroots organizing approach.

Fred Ross's son, Fred Ross, Jr., followed in his footsteps by becoming a community organizer. He retained the tactics learned from his father and worked alongside both Chavez and Huerta. Ross Jr. played a large role in the Active Citizenship campaign, Gallo march, and other UFW events. Ross Jr.'s legacy remains in the national organization he began with the help of his father, Neighbor to Neighbor. Neighbor to Neighbor was founded in 1986 to recruit and train organizers to put political pressure on Congress to stop U.S. military aid to right wing forces in Central America. Neighbor to Neighbor employed similar techniques to the UFW, including a house meeting campaign targeting swing members of Congress developed by Ellie Cohen, a boycott of Salvadoran coffee, and provided a vital training ground for young activists to become the key organizers in the mid-to-late 1980s.

== Campaign work ==
Ross served as the deputy campaign manager of then-San Francisco mayor Dianne Feinstein's successful campaign to defeat her 1983 recall.

== Personal life ==
Ross had three children, Robert, Julia, and Fred. Fred was named after his father.

Ross was inducted into the California Hall of Fame in 2014.
