= Leonora O'Reilly =

American activist

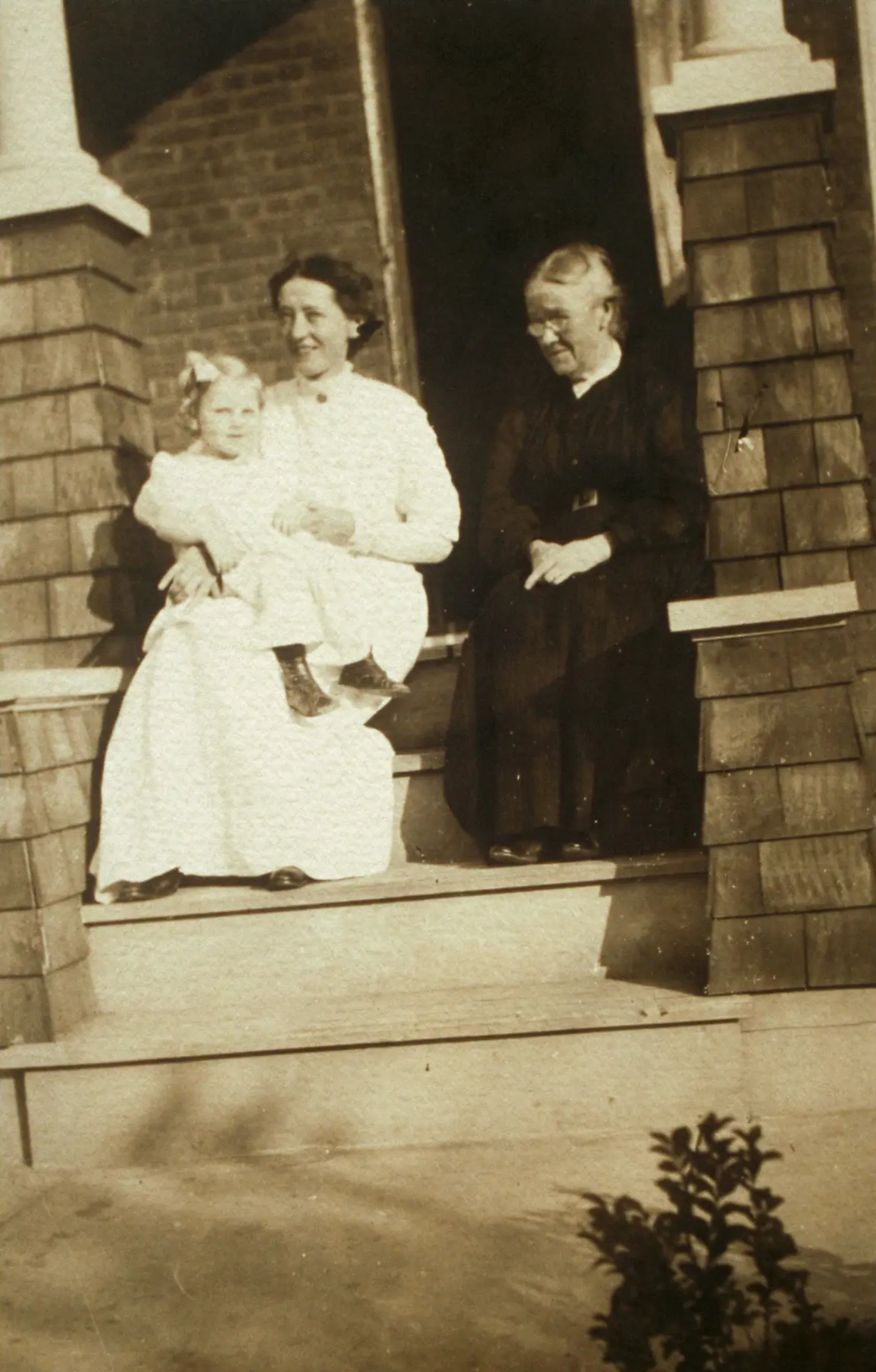
- O'Reilly with her mother and daughter c. 1907
- Born: February 16, 1870; New York City
- Died: April 3, 1927 (aged 57); Brooklyn, New York City
- Occupation: Labor leader
- Children: Alice O'Reilly (adopted 1907, died 1911)
- Parent(s): John O'Reilly (father), Winifred (Rooney) O'Reilly (mother)

Leonora O'Reilly (February 16, 1870 – April 3, 1927) was an American feminist, suffragist, and trade union organizer. O'Reilly was born in New York state, raised on the Lower East Side of Manhattan in New York City. She was born into a working-class family and left school at the age of eleven to begin working as a seamstress. Leonora O'Reilly's parents were Irish immigrants escaping the Great Famine; her father, John, was a printer and a grocer and died while Leonora was the age of one, forcing her mother, Winifred Rooney O'Reilly, to work more hours as a garment worker in order to support Leonora and her younger brother.

O'Reilly worked from 1903 to 1915 an organizer and recruiter for the Women's Trade Union League (WTUL). On the streets of New York, O'Reilly spoke in public for labor reform and women's suffrage; her skills enabled her to represent women in 1911 at a New York Senate Committee on Suffrage as well as in various public meeting halls.

== Personal and family life ==
=== Family life ===
Leonora O'Reilly was the daughter of John O'Reilly, a printer and member of the Knights of Labor, and Winifred (Rooney) O'Reilly, an Irish-born dressmaker. John O'Reilly died when Leonora was one year old. Upon his death, Winifred O'Reilly supported herself and the child by sewing and taking in boarders.

O'Reilly accompanied her mother to meetings at Cooper Union and her father's friend, Victor Drury, helped instill in her an appreciation for the Italian nationalist Giuseppe Mazzini. O'Reilly counted among her influences radical Catholic priest and social justice advocate Fr. Edward McGlynn and anarchist Peter Kropotkin.

Leonora and Winifred O'Reilly both made their home in Brooklyn.

In 1907, Leonora O'Reilly, who never married, adopted a child, Alice. Alice died in 1911.

=== Personal life ===
At age 16, O'Reilly joined the Comte Synthetic Circle, a self-education group on the Lower East Side of Manhattan. Through this group, O'Reilly met her mentor, Victor Drury. Drury was a French-born intellectual, Knights of Labor activist, and anarchist; he had introduced O'Reilly to many books which helped compensate for her lack of formal education.

In 1898, Leonora O'Reilly took art courses at the Pratt Institute in New York graduating in 1900. She was supported in this and other activities by a wealthy Boston philanthropist named who, in 1897, provided O'Reilly with an annual salary, allowing her to leave wage work for full-time labor organizing. In 1909 O'Reilly was deeply involved in the New York Shirtwaist Strike, the Uprising of the 20,000. In part in reaction to what she thought was the betrayal of wealthy women supporters of the shirtwaist workers, in 1910, O'Reilly became a member of the Socialist Party of New York.

Nonetheless, she remained a dedicated supporter of women's rights and woman suffrage. In 1912 O'Reilly founded the Wage Earners Suffrage League, the "industrial wing" of the Woman Suffrage Party, and had called for more fair wages which many upper-class women were not as likely to support. O'Reilly had an 'equal pay for equal work' plan for the movement after they had made a dent in their efforts. O'Reilly served as the president of the Wage Earner's Suffrage League from 1911 to 1912. In this capacity she served as a volunteer investigator to the Triangle Shirtwaist Factory fire of 1911.

In 1912, O'Reilly was appointed as the Chair of the Industrial Committee of the New York City Women Suffrage Party.

Nicknamed as 'the agitator,' O'Reilly worked to empower the voice of women workers, rather than supporting their interests on the public platform alone. When speaking about disenfranchised women workers, she would frequently refer to them as 'intelligent women' and 'thinking women' because that is how O'Reilly perceived them, despite the patriarchal social-norms that at the time did not think as highly of the women. This was made evident throughout her speeches, but notably in her 1896 speech titled "Organization" in which she put heavy emphasis on providing the unprivileged class of workers a sense of class-consciousness against the big industries, which O'Reilly felt had exploited their hard labor.

In 1915, O'Reilly served as the Trade Union Delegate to the International Congress of Women. At this time O'Reilly was 45 years old and she began to suffer from the early stages of heart disease which would slowly trump her ability to be an energetic activist.

In 1919, O'Reilly again served as the Trade Union Delegate, this time to the International Congress for Working Women.

In 1925 and 1926, O'Reilly taught courses at New York's New School for Social Research; these courses were on topics related to 'the theory of the labor movement'.

In 1927, O'Reilly died at the age of 56 due to heart disease.

== Irish-American Female Leadership ==
When Irish nationalism gained prominence in the U.S in the early 1880s, it enabled Irish-American women their first experiences in the public sphere. They advocated for Irish independence when Irish men and women were oppressed back home. Within the nationalism movement in Ireland, radical aspects including a worker-centered agenda was called for in America –one that would "restore to producers the fruits of their labor". This movement attracted Irish American workers and drew women into reform movements beyond the scope of nationalism. Those who sought to reform did so to advocate for the exploited and vulnerable in America. Due to the lack of support from men in the labor movement, women turned to each other and formed alliances with those of middle-class status to seek remedies to aid "the working girl". This ultimately brought them beyond their own ethnic and class circles, into broader American reform tradition.

The prevalence of Irish women organizers during the late 19th and early 20th century can be attributed to the numerous Irish women in the female labor force during that period. Women accounted for a large proportion of the overall Irish immigration population, and the highest among other immigrant groups. Due to the high occurrence of poverty among immigrants, it was essential for women to find work in addition to men. The occurrence of late marriage, coupled with a less family-centered ethnic tradition enabled Irish American women to gain employment. Notably, it was not considered off-limits for single Irish women to work. Without the need to tend to marriage and household duties, women were allowed to work and thus contributed to the rise of Irish American female activists. It was a source of support for O'Reilly's decision to not marry, and a tradition in which that decision would not be considered deviant. Although a career as a labor activist was not a field open to women, the prominence of Irish American men in organizing influenced women to pursue it. It is evident that this cultural pattern enabled women to participate and remain in the labor force.

Unlike O'Reilly, many reformers of the era were well-educated, middle-class Protestant reformers. O'Reilly left school at an early age to follow her mother's trade – sewing. She faced poverty, brutal working conditions and unemployment that came with the Gilded Age. Like most Irish-American women activists, knew the injustices of industrial capitalism. The first Irish-American women to embrace social reform did so to advocate for the working-class in industrial America. Hence, ethnicity and class are main factors contributing to their entry into public life.

== Leonora O'Reilly's Cause ==
Leonora O'Reilly's experience growing up working-class allowed her to identify with the labor movement, which she saw as crucial for defending people, particularly women of her class. As a third-generation working woman, O'Reilly justified her right to speak for women in the labor force because of the cumulative experiences of a working mother and grandmother. In addition to focusing on women's place in society, O'Reilly advocated for changes that would allow women from unskilled to more skilled positions. She argued industrial education was crucial for the liberation of working women, and trade schools for girls in the absence of apprenticeships available to boys. She was convinced wage equality would be possible when women became skilled workers. Therefore, O'Reilly saw women's suffrage as a route to equal political rights and ultimately wage equality. It is notable that during the Irish Rebellion, O'Reilly devoted her attention to support of Irish nationalism to international labor issues.

== Career and political activism ==
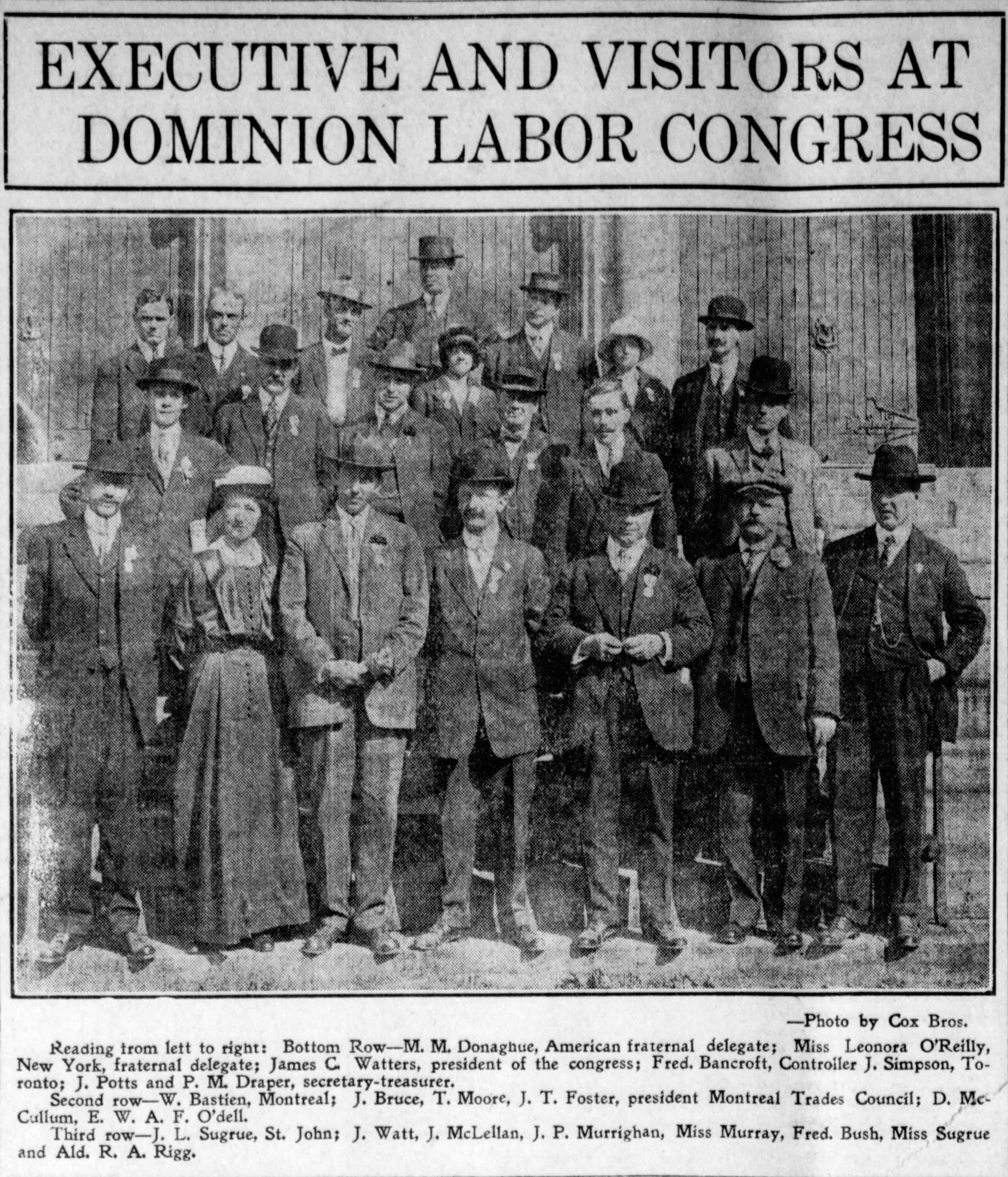
O'Reilly (front row, second from left) at the Dominion Labor Congress, 1914

O'Reilly began working in a factory at age 11 as the assistant to a seamstress in New York.

in 1881, at the age of eleven, Leonora was forced to give up school to work in a New York collar factory, earning $1 per dozen finished collars. When the pay dropped to 50 cents three years later, O'Reilly joined the knights of labor and participated in her first strike.

Leonora O'Reilly early in her life became engaged with the labor reform and women's suffrage movements and at 16 she joined the Knights of Labor with her mother, Winifred O'Reilly, who soon followed her daughter's lead. Leonora belonged to many organizations composed of both working class and elite men and women. Mentors helped further her education. After attending the Pratt Institute in Brooklyn, O'Reilly and her mother became residents at the Asacog House, a settlement house in Brooklyn. She also taught at the Manhattan Trade School.

After being formally introduced to labor rights efforts, in 1886 O'Reilly formed the cross-class Working Women's Society.

O'Reilly assembled a group of fellow collar makers to discuss their injustices and explore possible solutions. Together with other women activists, Leonora solidified the group and held discussions on how to build unionism among the exploited workingwomen in New York City. The group was soon composed of shop women and factory operatives, including Alice L. Woodbridge and Ida Van Etten. Together they helped organize the Working Women's Society. Its objectives were "to found trades' organizations in trades where they at present do not exist, and to encourage and assist labor organizations to the end of increasing wages and shortening hours".

At this time, Louise Perkins, a women's activist and philanthropist, had taken interest in O'Reilly's work, inviting her to membership in New York's Social Reform Club as this group would often speak on the contemporary issues surrounding the political economy. Only with the financial support of elite women such as Louise Perkins was O'Reilly able to give up manual labor and become a full-time labor organizer with the Women's Trade Union League.

O'Reilly organized the local women's United Garment Workers of America in 1897.

In 1903, O'Reilly joined the Women's Trade Union League (WTUL) which sought to bring women into labor unions. In 1903, she served as the WTUL vice-president.

The Women's Trade Union League included working class women and also those from middle and upper-class families. WTUL also was open to women of all ethnic backgrounds as their diverse membership included Italian, Eastern European Jewish, and Irish women. The WTUL reported in the year between 1908 and 1909, O'Reilly had officially given 32 speeches credited to her name alone, while between 1909 and 1913, reports suggest she gave speeches nearly every day.

O'Reilly advocated to bring women to the vote, where they would gain independence and confidence men often thought they lacked. Suffrage was essential to better working conditions, such as abolishing sweatshops, raising wages, reducing work hours and helping them unionize. "Behind suffrage" Leonora wrote, "is the demand for equal pay for equal work" and that women workers would cease to be a threat to union men's wage scales once they gained the vote.

As a WTUL organizer, and the vice president of New York city's WTUL she helped organize the 1909 New York city strike nicknamed the uprising of the 20,000, by raising money to support strikers, urging boycotts of firms being struck, and organizing mass protests. She also galvanized protests following the Triangle factory fire of 1911, by using the tragedy to build support for factory safety reforms.

Because the WTUL consisted of working-class individuals who lacked education and money, they were unable to organize effectively without the aid of powerful allies. Thus, the league was dominated by affluent middle-class women who were educated, had financial ability and political clout. These progressive reformers attempted to steer workers away from radical influences, particularly the Socialist Party which O'Reilly and Rose Schneiderman, a fellow WTUL leader and organizer, were members of. This resulted in issues of credibility between classes within the league and Socialists members distrusted the work of these affluent reformers. As such, O'Reilly and Schneiderman often felt torn by competing loyalties. The league seemed to them "to act out patronizing benevolence that had little to do with real coalition building", and the two leading organizes were angered by what they saw as attempts of allies to manipulate them. Eventually, O'Reilly resigned in Jan 1906, claiming an "overdose" of allies.

In 1909, O'Reilly was a part of the New York Shirtwaist Strike of 1909, also known as the 'Uprising of 20,000’. This same year, O'Reilly joined the recently founded National Association for the Advancement of Colored People (NAACP), supporting African American rights. She also was supporting peace efforts, speaking critically of World War I.

O'Reilly founded the Wage Earner's Suffrage League in 1911 and served as its president from 1911 to 1912.

O'Reilly and Schneiderman founded the league on March 22, 1911. O'Reilly was a senior member and a street corner speaker who because of her excellency, was elected president. The league's goal was threefold "to urge working women to understand the necessity for the vote, to agitate for the vote, and to study how to use the vote when it has been acquired".

An ardent socialist, Leonora O'Reilly was a delegate to the 1915 Hague Women's Peace Convention, sailing through mine-laden waters aboard the MS Noordam. She also cooperated with Indian independence organizations. Around 1918, O'Reilly devoted herself to the radical section of American Irish nationalism.

In 1919 O'Reilly spoke at the International Congress for Working Women in Washington D.C. Despite O'Reilly's lack of formal education, she was given the opportunity to teach a course at New York's New School for Social Research on 'the theory of the labor movement' in 1925 and 1926.

=== International Women's Day ===
The first International Women's Day (IWD) was declared and celebrated on February 23, 1909. The American Socialists declared IWD to be on the last Sunday of the month of February. This holiday sought to highlight the 'means by which to unite the popular community around a set of common goals', human rights in the form of equal wages, social status, and voting rights for all women.

On February 23, 1909, in New York City's Murray Hill Lyceum at 34th and 3rd Avenue, Leonora O'Reilly spoke to over two-thousand audience members explaining the principles of equal rights and demanding women's equal right to vote. This was the first official celebration of the holiday which led a path towards historical accountability for women's rights all over the world. The holiday was not widely celebrated as many American and European socialists were less interested in the suffragist movement as the idea of promoting full women's rights was seen as subordinate to the economic advancement of male working class citizens.

There is some controversy between American and European historians and women's rights activists as to when the International Women's Day was first established. Some believe that the first American IWD was on March 8, 1907, a day marking the 50th anniversary of the New York Strike of Female Textile Workers. The European women's rights activists had declared their International Women's Day on March 18, 1911.

== The Irish Rebellion ==
Leonora O'Reilly became involved in support of the Irish Revolution, an uprising against British rule of Ireland founded in opposition to imperialistic policies. During the years between 1916 and 1923, Irish nationalists sought help from Irish labor movement leaders in the US, as a response to the US support of the British in World War I. Labor leaders in Ireland encouraged Irish immigrants in the US to boycott British goods, pass trade-union resolutions in favor of the Irish Revolution and for US diplomatic recognition of the Irish Republic. Irish nationalists reasoned that Irish American labor leaders should support the movement as they were fighting for justice and the equality of all workers. Moreover, it was argued that British imperialism damaged American workers, notably related to the elite Anglo-Protestant groups in the US siding with the British and discriminating against Irish American workers. O'Reilly responded positively to Irish nationalists later in her career and became a key figure in international networks that supported the Irish Rebellion. O'Reilly was involved in an array of organizations associated with the Irish Rebellion, including Cumann na mBan (Irish Women's Council), the Friends of Irish Freedom, the Irish Progressive League, the Labor Bureau of the American Commission of Irish Independence, the American Women Pickets for the Enforcement of American War Aims, and the Irish Women's Purchasing League.

O'Reilly was notable for using her contacts to drive support for boycotts. The first was a boycott by dockworkers who refused to unload British cargoes across major American cities including New York, Boston, Philadelphia, New Orleans and Galveston. This led to O'Reilly organizing a group from the American Women Pickets for the Enforcement of American War Aims to incite the first group of dockworkers in New York to walk off their jobs and which led to similar actions by groups in other cities. The movement attracted international attention, particularly from Irish republican women leaders who came to the US to attract backing for the Irish Rebellion.

Later, O'Reilly was involved in a consumer boycott of British goods. This campaign was led by Chicago Federation of Labor President John Fitzpatrick and labor lawyer Frank Walsh of the Labor Bureau of the American Commission on Irish Independence. O'Reilly published a list in conjunction with the Women's Purchasing League of goods to be boycotted, and using a rational that women did most of the shopping. Regardless of its financial impact, the boycotting campaign highlighted a division within the American Federation of Labor (AFL) over the question of imperialism. AFL leaders advocated that the labor movement should support government foreign policies. This support might then be conceded during times of national crisis to achieve concessions for American workers. By contrast, O'Reilly sided with other labor leaders, such as John Fitzpatrick, in a fundamental opposition to imperialism. Even when at odds with government policy, she believed such opposition was an appropriate purpose of the labor movement and a primary focus of labor solidarity.
