= Wage Earner's Suffrage League =

Suffrage organization founded in New York in 1911

The Wage Earner’s Suffrage League was a suffrage organization founded in New York City in 1911 that sought to bridge politics and labor towards the end goal of achieving women’s suffrage and ultimately disbanded in 1912. The Wage Earner’s League is an example of a predominately female led effort to bring working women into the suffrage movement to gain political momentum and influence.

== Background ==
The Wage Earner’s Suffrage League was a result of the differing opinions within the Socialist Party and the lack of representation of working women within the National American Woman Suffrage Association (NAWSA). Following hostilities amongst members, the Socialist Party leaders convened in a party conference in December 1909 seeking a rapprochement between suffragism and Socialism. One of the issues discussed was the path of involvement Socialist suffragist should take. The National American Woman Suffrage Association was proving to be an atmosphere uncongenial to working women, while members such as Leonora O’Reilly and Rose Schneiderman injected new vigor into organizing and sought to break from its traditions. Socialist suffragists represented by Rose Schneiderman and Leonora O’Reilly pressed for the Socialist party to allow working women to freely choose their potential supporters outside of the Socialist Party. Opposing the view of Schneiderman and O'Reilly, several other Socialist suffragists called for Socialist-controlled suffrage work. Due to political alliances, the faction within the Socialist Party headed by Schneiderman and O’Reilly was defeated at the party conference in 1909 as it was decided to pursue suffrage from within the framework of Socialist Party.

== Founding ==
Following their defeat at the Socialist Party conference in 1909, utilizing the assistance of Mary Ritter Beard of the National Woman's Party, Rose Schneiderman and Leonora O'Reilly withdrew to form a separate suffrage organization run by, and for, factory workers seeking to enable working women to utilize the political resources of their choosing. Rose Schneiderman and Leonora O'Reilly officially founded the Wage Earner’s League for Woman Suffrage on March 22, 1911 in New York City. This organization sought to utilize the support of the mainstream suffrage movement in a pragmatic effort to attain the vote for women. Among the organization’s cofounders were shirtwaist makers Clara Lemlich and Mollie Schepps, and laundry worker Margaret Hinchey. The oldest of the founders, Leonora O'Reilly, was elected the president of the Wage Earner’s League while the famed organizer of the New York shirtwaist strike of 1909, Clara Lemlich, was elected its vice president and would serve as the organization’s chief organizer.

== Organizational practices and goals ==
The Wage Earner’s Suffrage League prioritized giving a political voice to wage-earning women and sought to keep organizational control firmly within their hands, while also reaching out to immigrants and non-wage-earning women. The league’s founders agreed upon the principle framework of allowing only workers to become full voting members, ensuring the league would be for, and ran by, workers. Although it restricted full membership solely to workers, the Wage Earners Suffrage League did not reject the participation of other women altogether. Although it did not reject their participation, it did restrict their membership capacity, not allowing them to hold any sway in regard to the shaping of the league’s campaigns, literature, or speeches. Resulting from the league’s leaders heavy focus upon factories and immigrant neighborhoods as grounds for its outreach, the organization’s membership was decidedly working-class. While the majority of the league’s membership was from within the working-class, its small number of non-working-class members provided most of the financial support that constituted the league’s budget. These non-working class members were termed not as members, but allies, and were permitted to attend the league’s meetings and assist with the league’s work. The Wage Earner’s Suffrage League chose was an affiliate with the National American Woman Suffrage Association. The Wage Earner’s Suffrage League identified itself as the labor wing of the National American Woman Suffrage Association.

== Early outreach and reaction ==
The league proved successful in spreading its message to unaffiliated working women, due in part to the league’s leaders targeting the same women workers they were unionizing and also to the ability of chief organizer Clara Lemlich, who was a skilled and passionate speaker, and often recited her speeches in Yiddish. The Wage Earner’s Suffrage League targeted both housewives ad wage-earning women through leaflets and pamphlets it distributed. These leaflets utilized rhetoric characterized by directness. Leaflets asked direct questions such as “Why are you paid less than a man? Why do you work in a firetrap? Why are your hours so long? Because you are a woman and have no vote. Votes make the law. Votes enforce the law. The law controls conditions. Women who want better conditions must vote.” The rhetoric utilized by the league framed suffrage as the key to the solving the issues facing wage-earning women. During the league’s first year, Leonora O'Reilly, Clara Lemlich, and Mollie Schepps spoke on a regular basis outside factories, as the shifts of workers were changing. The Wage Earner’s Suffrage League also passed out handbills in a direct outreach to working-class housewives seeking to publicize Suffrage Week from September 1–9, 1911. This handbill asked women questions such as, “Would you ensure child welfare for all children everywhere or only your own at home? Do you want pure food from cow to kitchen or in the kitchen only? Don’t you think equal pay for all women who toil should be a given rather than a privilege?” The reaction to the league’s distributed items, such as leaflets or handbills, is unknown due to the lack of any recorded responses. The league did not have the financial support to print more than an occasional leaflet or handbill, and this financial limitation led the league to rely not on printed materials, but on spoken word through its passionate orators. The league relied upon funding not only from its internal allies, but also the financial support of the middle class group the College Equal Suffrage League. The league held its meetings mainly outdoors and relied heavily on crowded New York street corners as its primary organizing tool. The league’s leaders, O’Reilly, Lemlich, and Schepps, also spoke at night in worker neighborhoods in an effort to target housewives returning from their shopping. The league made conscious efforts to reach out to wage-earning women as much as housewives, resulting in a general increase in pro-suffrage enthusiasm.

== Cooper Union rally ==
The Wage Earner’s Suffrage League’s largest public effort was that of the rally held at Cooper Union in 1912. The league staged a protest of the New York State legislature’s failure to issue a formal endorsement of women’s suffrage during the state legislature’s suffrage debate. Mary Ritter Beard of the National Woman’s Party had suggested that O'Reilly gather the leaders of the Wage Warner’s Suffrage League and respond to the statements made against suffrage. The league seized the opportunity to generate widespread interest and support, leafleting the factory districts in the weeks leading up to the rally. Mary Beard's suggestion resulted in the rally not being structured as speakers delivering speeches, but rather as several prominent wage-earning women issuing a direct and formal response to the arguments presented by state senators speaking out against suffrage. On the night of April 22, 1912 Cooper Union filled with an overflowing crowd of thousands, composed almost entirely of wage-earning women. The speakers at the Cooper Union rally reinforced the need for women’s independence in their individual responses. These responses centered upon statements made by senators regarding the protection of women from the vote, citing the need to preserve marital harmony, female morality, and femininity. Mollie Schepps recounted the treatment striking shirtwaist makers received from the New York City police and judges, emphasizing its brutality and attacked the notion that equal wages between the sexes would erode the sanctity of marriage. Clara Lemlich attacked the notion that the vote was a burden and sought to respond to the notion that it would corrupt female morality. Rose Schneiderman issued a speech expanding upon varying notions of femininity and utilized a class-based approach to recommend that working women define femininity on their own terms. These speeches made by Schneiderman, Lemlich, and Schepps combined to offer a working class critique of female behavior presented through a growing perception of industrial feminism. Each speech sought to break down the argument of those opposing suffrage in an effort to highlight their manipulation of class and gender to oppress women. The Wage Earner’s Suffrage League presented the solution to ending this manipulation, framed as the vote, as they recommended that only suffrage could bring women full independence and allow them access to political power.

== Dissipation ==
There are no further records of the Wage Earner’s Suffrage League’s existence following the rally at Cooper Union on April 22, 1912. According to historian Annelise Orleck, the dissipation of the league is believed to have come as a result of a combination of factors ranging from the organization lacking a full-time organizer, funding drying up, the firing of Clara Lemlich, and the departure of Rose Schneiderman to work for another suffrage organization in the summer of 1912. In its short existence, the Wage Earner’s Suffrage League sought to bring the suffrage movement and the labor movement together in an effort to give working women educative lessons through their political participation.
