= Schneiderman =

Schneidermann, Schneiderman, or Shneiderman (Yiddish: Shnayderman, Shneyderman) is a surname of Germanic origin, composed of "Schneider" ("tailor") and "Mann" ("person"/"man").

Notable people with the surname include:

- Alexaundra Schneiderman (born 1996), South Korean-American singer known professionally as AleXa
- David Schneiderman (1947–2025), American newspaper editor and publisher
- Davis Schneiderman (born 1974), American writer, academic, and higher-education administrator
- Eric Schneiderman (born 1954), American lawyer and politician from New York
- Harry Schneiderman (1885–1975), Polish-born American communal administrator and editor
- Rose Schneiderman (1882–1972), Polish-born American socialist and feminist
- Valerie Le Zimring-Schneiderman (born 1965), American rhythmic gymnast

== Schneidermann ==
- Daniel Schneidermann (born 1958), French journalist

== Shneiderman ==
- Ben Shneiderman (born 1947), American computer scientist and professor
  - Nassi–Shneiderman diagram (NSD), in computer programming, a graphical design representation for structured programming

== See also ==
- Schneider (surname)
