= 1919 International Congress of Working Women =

Meeting of labor feminists

The First International Congress of Working Women (ICWW), convened by the Women's Trade Union League of America from October 28 to November 6, 1919, was a meeting of labor feminists from around the world. The ICWW planned to share their proposals for addressing women's labor concerns at the First International Labor Conference (ILC) of 1919. ICWW delegates agreed upon a list of resolutions, some of which were taken up by the ILC's Commission on the Employment of Women and resulted in the passage of the Maternity Protection Convention, 1919 (No. 3).

== Background ==
The dawn of industrialization in the eighteenth and nineteenth centuries transformed methods of production and revolutionized social relations, beginning in northern Europe. Textiles and clothing were among the first industries radically altered by the use of machines and the concentration of labor in mills and factories. The subsequent demand for unskilled laborers drew large numbers of women and children into the industrial, waged labor force.

Female factory workers, like men, often faced long hours and horrible conditions in the workplace, but unique to their sex, women also suffered from lower wages, discriminatory hiring practices, and the double burden of household work. Other sectors of the economy posed other unique risks. Domestic service, a major source of employment for women, offered little time off and left women vulnerable to sexual exploitation. Concerns about general and sex-specific exploitation drove female workers in Europe and the United States to organize and strike for fair wages and work hours. By the second half of the nineteenth century, powerful national working-class federations and political parties began to form to demand changes to labor conditions, but almost uniformly, women were marginalized, if not outright excluded, from these such organizations, which championed the rights of the male breadwinner.

By the early twentieth century, female labor activists and their upper-class allies came together in national organizations dedicated to the pursuit of industrial justice, democracy, and women's rights. These included the British Women's Trade Union League, founded in 1874, and the Women's Trade Union League of America, founded in 1903.

== Formation of the Congress ==
The year 1919 marked the beginning of the Paris Peace Conference and the establishment of the Treaty of Versailles, which included a Labour Charter calling for the creation of an international body dedicated to regulating labor worldwide. The Treaty created a standing world government, the League of Nations, as well as the International Labour Organization (ILO). The ILO had the responsibility of addressing labor issues, setting international labour standards, and promoting peace through social justice.

International labor turned their attention to the ILO and the Paris Peace Conference. Margaret Dreier Robins, president of U.S. labor organization the Women's Trade Union League (WTUL), saw this international gathering as an opportunity to address the new era for women whose labor internationally proved essential to producing food, munitions, and manufactured goods throughout the first World War. The WTUL encouraged women from around the world to gather at the conference to make their voices and concerns surrounding labor conditions heard. Rose Schneiderman and Mary Anderson, both leading members of the WTUL, quickly ascended to France to address the newly established ILO. With them, they brought a document listing labour standards which was drafted by the WTUL's Committee on Social and Industrial Reconstruction. The document included standards such as, "equal pay for equal work," a maximum of an eight-hour day and a forty-four-hour work week, prohibiting night work for women, and social wages for maternity, old age, and unemployment. Schneiderman and Anderson, were not able to present the WTUL's document to the Conference, but met with Britain's Margaret Bondfield and many other women labor leaders from around the world. The female labor leaders agreed to establish an international labor women's conference to prepare for the upcoming ILO convention which would take place in October in Washington D.C. A Call for Delegates was rapidly established and urged women of internationally recognized labor unions to attend the ICWW. The International Congress of Working Women was established and was scheduled to meet in mid October to discuss and establish their own labor guidelines which would protect women laborers internationally.

1st International Congress of Working Women called by the National Women's Trade Union League of America, Washington, D.C., October 28, 1919

== Goals and Accomplishments of the 1919 ICWW ==
Twenty eight delegates from Argentina, Belgium, Canada, Czechoslovakia, France, Great Britain, India, Italy, Norway, Poland, and Sweden attended the international women's congress. However, women from Cuba, Denmark, Japan, the Netherlands, Serbia, Spain, and Switzerland also attended and participated in decision making. Overall, over two hundred women attended the congress. Margaret Dreier Robins of the WTUL sat as chair of the 1919 International Congress of Working Women and planned to create a draft of resolutions to be sent to the first annual conference of the International Labor Organization.

After ten days, the delegates of the ICWW finalized many decisions revolved around labour standards. The ICWW completed a document which held ten provisions which would be presented to the ILO during their first annual conference in Washington D.C. The congress included a requirement in their document which demanded to raise the number of ILO delegates from each nation from four to six and also require two of the six to be women. In addition, the ICWW was responsible for creating an everlasting organization, the International Federation of Working Women. However, all of these decisions and the establishment of these provisions did not come without debate. The women laborers present at the conference were divided while discussing the eight hour day, night work, and maternity insurance. All of these debates stemmed from how to define the "woman worker". Whether to define women laborers through a gender neutral manner, or through "protective" labor legislation. Delegates from Norway and Sweden both proposed women should not be allowed to work during the night time because it would put them in danger. Schneiderman believed this was untrue, and proposed that if women wanted to work at night and take the risk they should be able to. The congress compromised opinions by adhering to the limiting of night work of women, but also extended this proposal to all men as well.

In addition, Czechoslovak delegate Marie Majerová urged her fellow delegates to view domestic responsibilities of women as part of the eight hour day. She recognized domestic work lied heavily on the woman's shoulders and understood this takes a large toll on women all around the world. Unfortunately, the delegates did not find this opinion appealing and a broader discussion of housework did not take place. Rather, Robins focused the discussion of the eight hour day around agricultural and industrial home work. Finally, the women of the congress agreed on an eight-hour day and a forty-four-hour week for all workers.

While discussing the topic of maternity protection, American and British delegates agreed on their opinions surrounding motherhood free form wage labor. However, many other nations believed that women could mix wage labor and family responsibilities if they had certain provisions. Women from Belgium believed women needed Saturday afternoons off to do housework and shop, and women from France and Italy believed that women needed daycares which were near their workplaces and also needed breaks for breastfeeding, in addition to two breaks which will allow them to eat with their families. American and British delegates did not agree women should be nursing their young at work. Jean Bouvier of the French delegation did defend the necessity of breastfeeding at work. Both opinions were brought to the ILO conference.

After debates and discussions, the ICWW did create a document which was presented at the International Labor Conference. The document addressed: an eight-hour day and a forty-four-hour week for all workers, limits on child labor, maternity benefits, prohibition of work at night for both men and women and in hazardous situations, new policies for the unemployed and emigration, an "equal distribution of raw materials existing in the world," an end to the Russian Blockade, and the establishment of a permanent bureau of the International Congress of Working Women with its office in the United States.

== Commission on the Employment of Women ==
A commission of the ILO, The Commission on the Employment of Women, was responsible for two conventions: The Maternity Protection Convention and a convention revolved around night work for women. Both conventions were largely affected by the ICWW's proposals and by leading ICWW women. The Maternity Protection Convention covered a variety of provisions governing maternity benefits in industrial and commercial undertakings. Jeanne Bouvier, Margaret Bonfield, Mary Macarthur, and Constance Smith all participated in the ICWW and were appointed as delegates to the Commission on the Employment of Women during the ILO conference. The Maternity Protection Convention documented their agreements and decisions concerning the protection of female workers, and formed a document consisting of twelve articles. The document stated: women would receive a six-week maternity leave after their child's birth, women would be paid benefits sufficient for the full health maintenance for her and her child, women will be granted job protection, entitled to free attendance by a doctor or certified midwife, and once returned to work she will be given two half an hour breaks to breastfeed her newborn child. Nations which ratified the convention would agree to its provisions and imbed them in their nations legislation. The women of the ICWW were influential in the decisions made during the International Labor Organization's Maternity Protection Convention.

During the second conference which addressed the night work of women, women from the ICWW also voiced their opinions. Betsy Kjelsberg, of Norway, believed that special laws which are established for the protection of women are demeaning for women. She explained that she would work for the gradual elimination of night work for women as well as men. The final provisions for the night work convention did prohibit the employment of women after 10 pm or before 5 am, but did not extend this provision to male laborers.

== The IFWW After 1919 ==
The second International Congress of Working Woman, which took place in 1921 in Geneva addressed membership into the everlasting organization of the ICWW, the International Federation of Working Woman. The Federation compromised and allowed trade unions with female members to join the federation and also allowed women's labor organizations who shared their same values to join them as well.

In Vienna in 1923 the third International Conference of Working Women took place. This conference discussed the challenges of relating to an international labor movement which was largely male oriented and dominated. The delegates of the third ICWW decided to join with the International Federation of Trade Unions, which would cause the federation to dissolve.
