= Emma Steghagen =

American activist

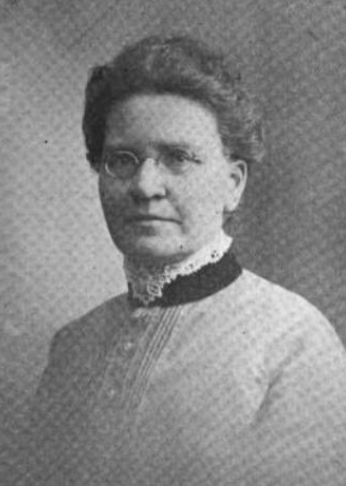
- Emma Steghagen, from a 1908 publication
- Born: March 5, 1856; Oskaloosa, Iowa, U.S.
- Died: October 31, 1948 (aged 92); Van Buren County, Michigan, U.S.
- Occupations: Labor organizer, suffragist, activist

Emma Steghagen (March 5, 1856 – October 31, 1948) was an American labor organizer and suffragist, based in Chicago. She was secretary and treasurer of the Women's Trade Union League (WTUL) of Chicago, organized the Wage Earners Suffrage League in Chicago, and served on the American Committee on Conditions in Ireland.

== Early life ==
Emma Steghagen was born in Oskaloosa, Iowa, the daughter of German immigrants Frederick Steghagen and Wilhelmina "Minnie" Gleichman Steghagen. Her father was a cabinet maker.

== Career ==
Steghagen worked in a Chicago shoe factory as a young woman. She organized the first union in the American boot trade, and served on the national executive board of the Boot and Shoe Workers' Union. She was secretary and treasurer of the National Women's Trade Union League, on the same board as Agnes Nestor, Mary McDowell, and Margaret Dreier Robins. She was a frequent speaker before union locals and other community groups.

Steghagen was involved in suffrage work through the WTUL, and helped to organize the Wage Earners' Suffrage League in Chicago. In 1920, she joined the American Committee on Conditions in Ireland. In 1921 she was an American delegate the International Federation of Working Women in Geneva. In 1928, she worked on the presidential campaign of Herbert Hoover.

== Personal life ==
Steghagen lived with her brother Fred and her sisters Alwina and Matilda in Chicago; later she lived on a farm in Michigan. She died in 1948, aged 92 years, at a hospital in Van Buren County, Michigan. Her gravesite is in Bangor, Michigan.
