= Fola La Follette =

American actress

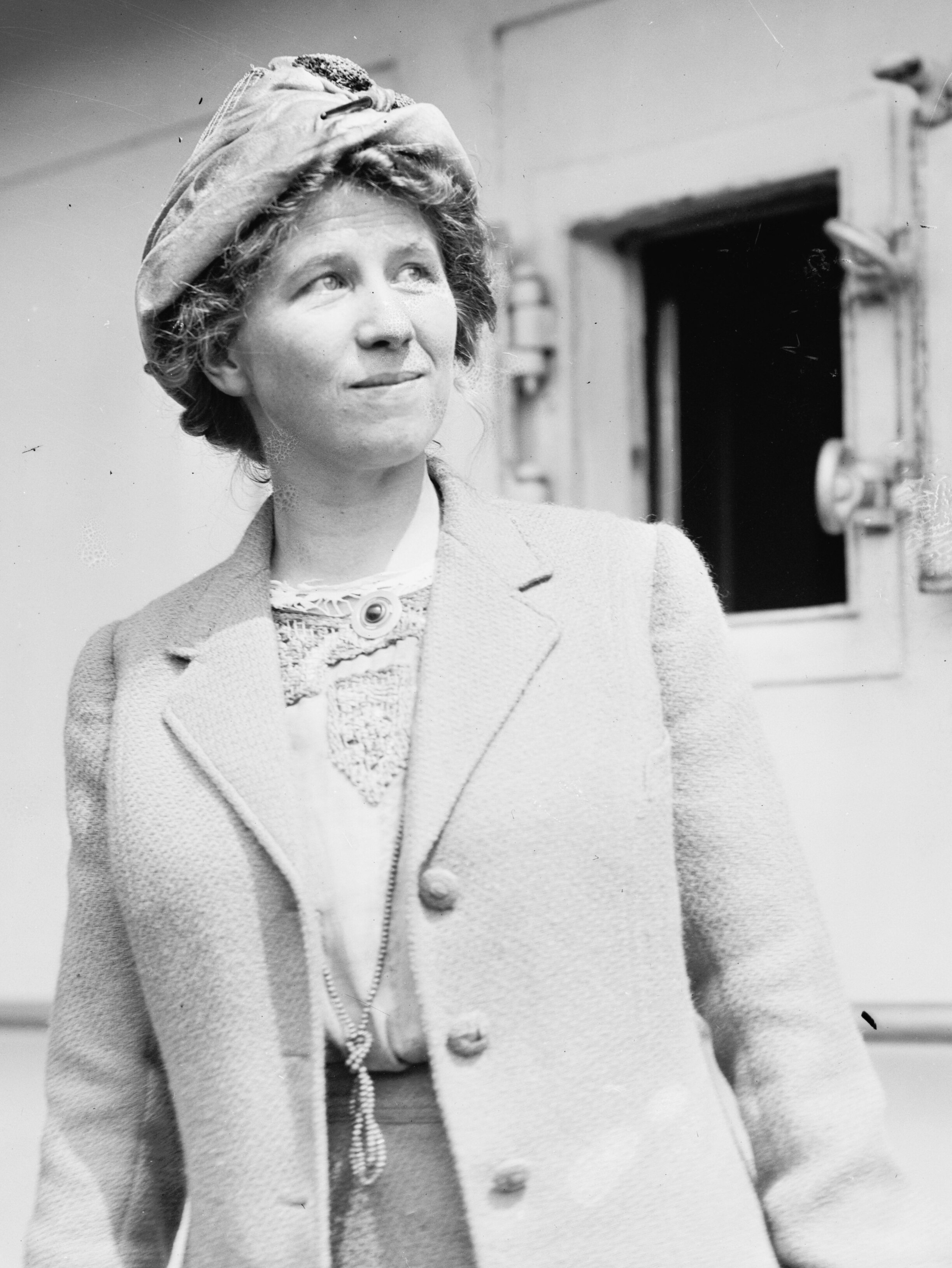
- Born: Flora Dodge La Follette; September 10, 1882; Madison, Wisconsin, U.S.
- Died: February 17, 1970 (aged 87); Arlington, Virginia, U.S.
- Resting place: Forest Hill Cemetery
- Education: University of Wisconsin-Madison
- Occupations: Suffrage and labor activist actress author
- Spouse(s): George Middleton, 1911
- Parent(s): Robert M. La Follette, Sr. and Belle Case La Follette
- Relatives: Robert M. La Follette, Jr. Philip La Follette

Flora Dodge La Follette (September 10, 1882 – February 17, 1970), known as Fola La Follette, was an American actress and teacher turned women's suffrage and labor activist and editor/author from Madison, Wisconsin. At the time of her death in 1970, The New York Times quoted her on women's suffrage: "A good husband is not a substitute for the ballot." She was the daughter of progressive politician Robert "Fighting Bob" La Follette and lawyer and women's suffrage leader Belle Case, wife of playwright George Middleton, a contributing editor to La Follette’s Weekly Magazine, an actress, and, with her mother, a chronicler of her father's life.

== Early life ==
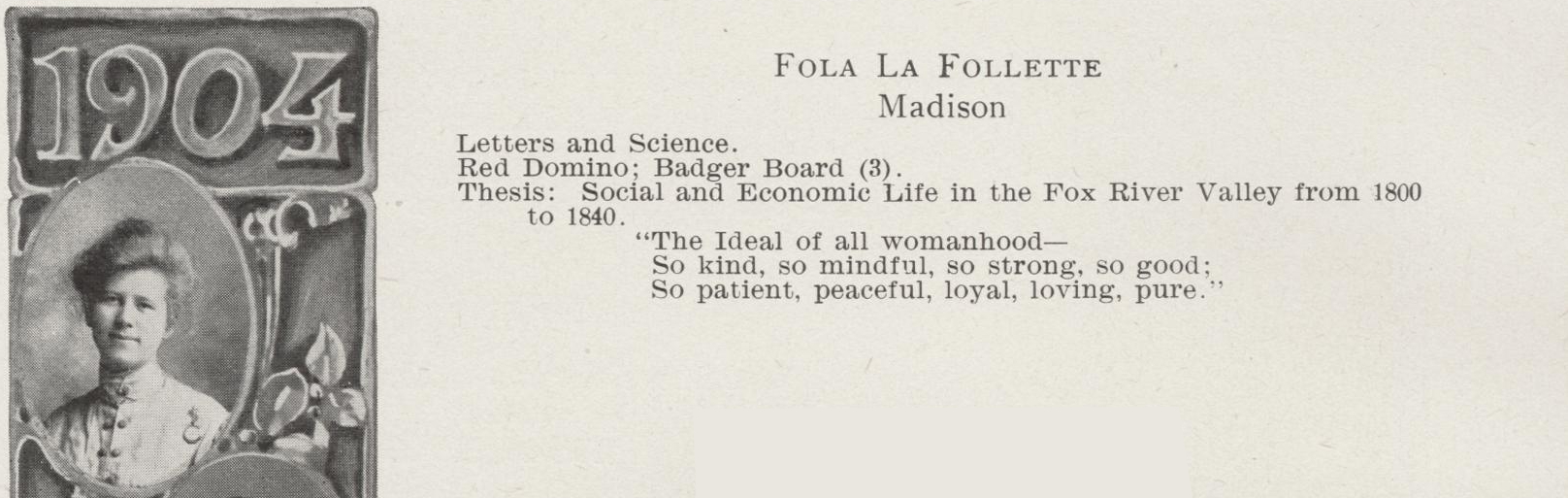
La Follette in the University of Wisconsin–Madison yearbook, 1905

On September 10, 1882, Fola La Follette was born the first child to lawyer and women's suffrage leader Belle Case La Follette and progressive politician Robert La Follette in Madison, Wisconsin. Her early education was at Wisconsin Academy in Madison. She went on to graduate from the University of Wisconsin.

== Career ==
=== Actress ===
After graduating, La Follette acted on the stage for ten years, marrying playwright George Middleton in 1911 while retaining her maiden name. She appeared on Broadway in such plays as Leo Ditrichstein's Bluffs (1908), Percy MacKaye's The Scarecrow (1911) and the Broadway production of her husband's Tradition.

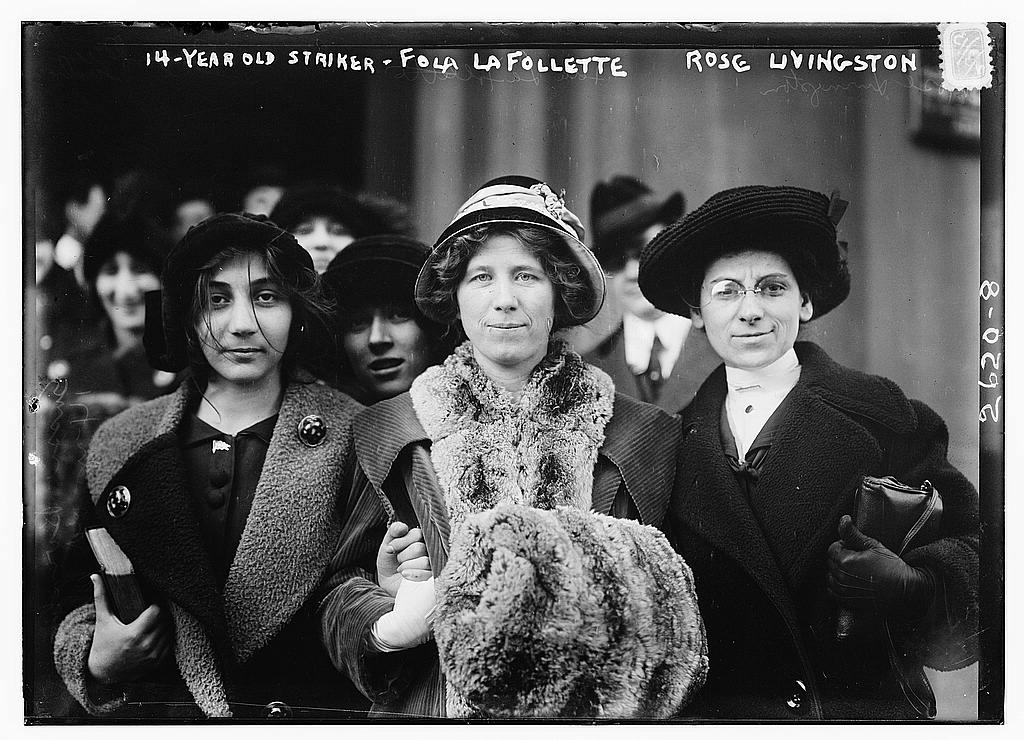
Unidentified striker, Fola La Follette and Rose Livingston

=== Women's suffrage and labor activist ===
La Follette wrote for periodicals in the cause of women's suffrage (see below) and was active in helping her mother in the cause from an early age.

But it was in the merger of La Follette's women's suffrage and acting careers where she made her greatest impact. She performed numerous times in the one-woman play How the Vote was Won, first in 1910, and, in 1912, she appeared in Vaudeville to give a well-received suffragist speech. Anna Shaw, president of the National American Woman Suffrage Association, wrote La Follette, praising the 1910 play: "I had the pleasure of being present at the benefit performance of 'How the Vote was Won' ... and I have wanted ever since to express to you and the others who took part with you, my appreciation for the splendid help that play was to our cause." For suffragists, La Follette became the embodiment of how they wished to be portrayed. Her wry, gracious performances stood as contradiction to the cliché of the "conventional traditional 'suffragists' who are the butt of the comic-joke maker."

In 1913, La Follette played a role in gaining her father's promise to intercede in the United States Senate on behalf of striking workers in the garment industry in New York City. She spent time as a strike picket and used the prominence of her voice as a member of an influential family and as a well-known actress to denounce the arrests and treatment of striking workers. It was a significant time in both the labor movement and women's movement, and the public's attention was caught by the concept of women picketing for their rights, and La Follette and other activists showed their support. In addition to picketing, La Follette gave a speech to the workers, went to court to testify on behalf of arrested workers and raised the issue of police brutality. Together with other society and college women, La Follette was part of what was referred to in this and other strikes as the "mink brigade", women whose dress and social status would give police pause in arresting them.

Together with other actors, La Follette helped found the actors' union Actors' Equity.

=== Political campaigner ===
In 1924, La Follette took the place of her mother Belle, who had become ill, in the presidential campaign of her father, Robert M. La Follette, Sr.

=== Teacher ===
From 1926 to 1930, La Follette taught at City and Country School in New York City, New York.

=== Author ===
La Follette served as a contributing editor to the family's eponymous progressive magazine and contributed to other periodicals.

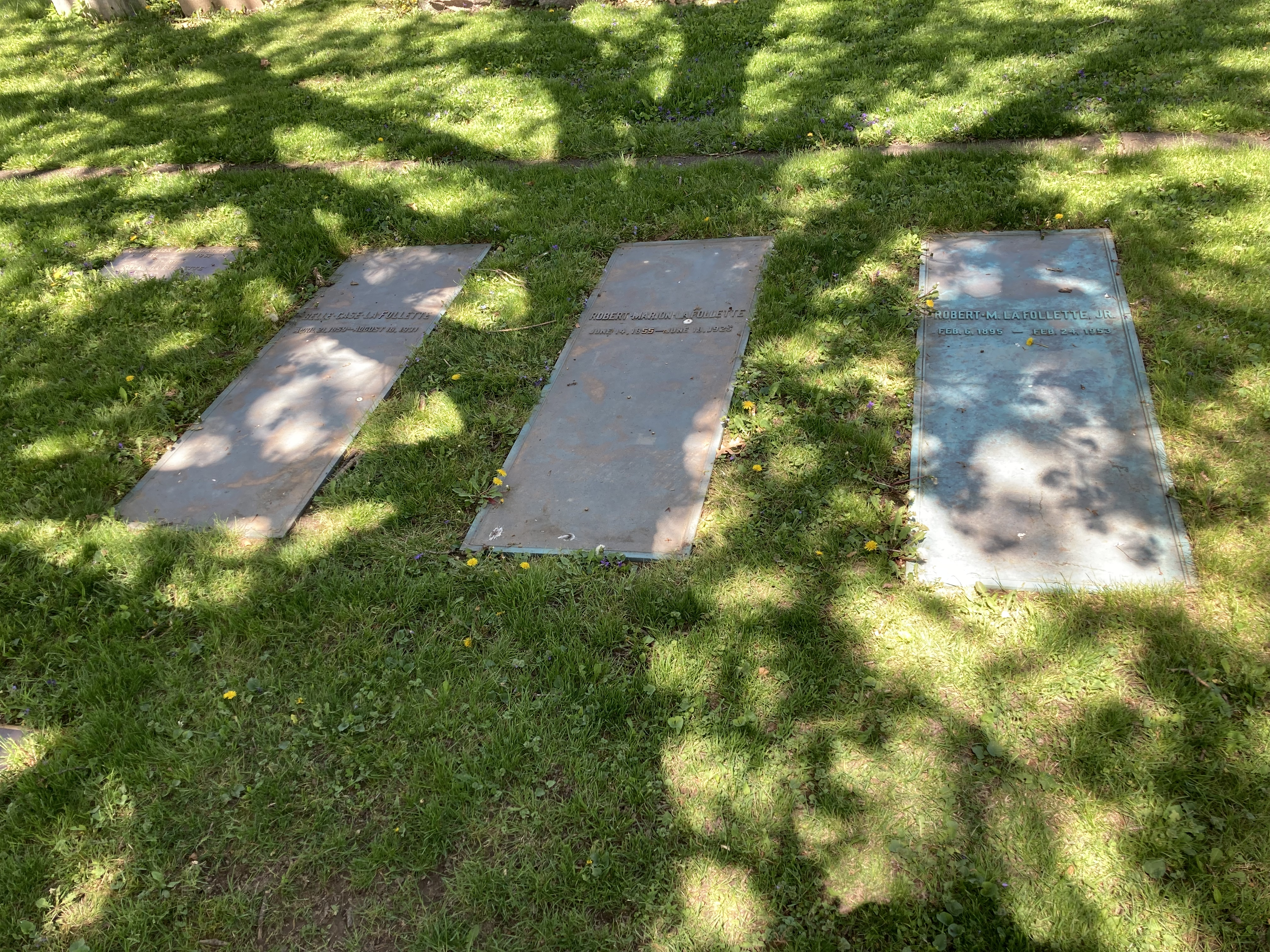
La Follette's grave (upper left) at Forest Hill Cemetery

La Follette's mother had begun a biography of Fola's famous father but died about one quarter of the way into the project. La Follette labored over the next 16 years to finish the biography, published in 1953, which the chief of the Manuscript Division of the Library of Congress called "brilliant" and of which The New York Times reviewer wrote: "What we have here, in sum, is a wonderfully rich and detailed personal account that goes far to restore to us one of the giants of the past generation."

== Death ==
La Follette died at the age of 87, of pneumonia, in a hospital in Arlington, Virginia on February 17, 1970. She was buried at Forest Hill Cemetery in Madison, Wisconsin.

== Publications ==
- Belle Case La Follette and Fola La Follette (1953). Robert M. La Follette, June 14, 1855-June 18, 1925, 2 volumes. MacMillan. ISBN 978-1-299-79732-1.
