= Irving Charles Velson =

American labor leader (1913–1976)

Irving Charles Velson (June 3, 1913 – 1976) was an American labor leader who had a long career in the Communist Party of the United States (CPUSA) secret apparatus and who allegedly worked for Soviet Military Intelligence (GRU). He was the son of Clara Lemlich Shavelson and changed his name to Velson by 1938. Velson worked as a machinist at the Brooklyn Navy Yard from 1931 to 1938.

According to Congressional investigators, Velson worked closely with J. Peters, head of the CPUSA's secret apparatus, and supported Cpl. Robert Osman in espionage activities on behalf of the GRU in the Panama Canal Zone. Robert Gladnick, a former CPUSA functionary and a member of the Lincoln Brigade supported this version. Gladnick stated that Bernard Schuster (aka Bernard Chester) then director of the CPUSA's antimilitarist operations, was replaced in the mid-1930s by Velson, in a program to develop secret Communist groups among American military personnel. Venona decrypts show Velson reporting on weapons technology and other agent handling tasks.

Velson's code name with the GRU, and as deciphered by the Venona project is "Nick".

== Venona ==
Velson is referenced in the following Venona decryptions:

- 1324 GRU New York to Moscow, 11 August 1943;
- 1456 GRU New York to Moscow, 8 September 1943.
