= Annelise Orleck =

American historian and professor (born 1959)

- Born: 22 January 1959 (age 67); Brooklyn, New York, U.S.
- Education: Evergreen State College (BA); New York University (PhD)
- Occupations: Historian, academic
- Notable work: Common Sense and a Little Fire: Women and Working-Class Politics in the United States, 1900-1965; Storming Caesar's Palace: How Black Mothers Fought Their Own War on Poverty; Rethinking American Women's Activism

Annelise Orleck (born 22 January 1959) is an American historian and professor at Dartmouth College. Her work primarily focuses on the working class and Jewish-American experience, with notable publications including Common Sense and a Little Fire: Women and Working-Class Politics in the United States, 1900-1965 and Storming Caesar's Palace: How Black Mothers Fought Their Own War on Poverty. In 2024, she was involved in pro-Palestinian protests on university campuses, leading to her arrest and temporary ban from Dartmouth College.

== Life and career ==
Annelise Orleck was born on January 22, 1959 in Brooklyn, the daughter of Norman and Thelma Orelick. She earned a BA from Evergreen State College in 1979 and a PhD from New York University in 1989. She has taught at Dartmouth College since 1990, where she has chaired both the women's and gender studies department and the Jewish studies department.

Much of her work has focused on the working class and Jewish-American experience. Her first book, Common Sense and a Little Fire: Women and Working-Class Politics in the United States, 1900-1965, focuses on four Jewish-American women activists, Rose Schneiderman, Fannia Cohn, Clara Lemlich Shavelson, and Pauline Newman. Her book Storming Caesar's Palace: How Black Mothers Fought Their Own War on Poverty examined how African-American women on public assistance fought for their rights and against negative stereotypes.

During the 2024 pro-Palestinian protests on university campuses, riot police arrested 90 people at Dartmouth College, including Orleck. Orleck was assaulted by police, dragged to the ground, and arrested. Orleck was banned from Dartmouth as a condition of bail, but Dartmouth later announced that it would not enforce the ban. Later that week, her bail conditions were "corrected" to temporarily banning her from only specific sites on campus instead of the entire campus.

In 2025, she was the president of the Dartmouth College chapter of the American Association of University Professors.

== Bibliography ==
- Common Sense and a Little Fire: Women and Working-Class Politics in the United States, 1900-1965, University of North Carolina Press (Chapel Hill, NC), 1995.
- (Editor, with Alexis Jetter and Diana Taylor) The Politics of Motherhood: Activist Voices from Left to Right (essays), University Press of New England (Hanover, NH), 1997.
- The Soviet Jewish Americans, Greenwood Press (Westport, CT), 1999, reprinted, University Press of New England (Hanover, NH), 2001.
- Storming Caesar's Palace: How Black Mothers Fought Their Own War on Poverty, Beacon Press (Boston, MA), 2005.
- (Editor, with L.G. Hazirjian) The War on Poverty: A New Grassroots History, 1964-1980, 2011
- Rethinking American Women's Activism, 2015.
