= Clara Lemlich =

Ukrainian-born Jewish American labor organizer (1886-1982)

Clara Lemlich Shavelson
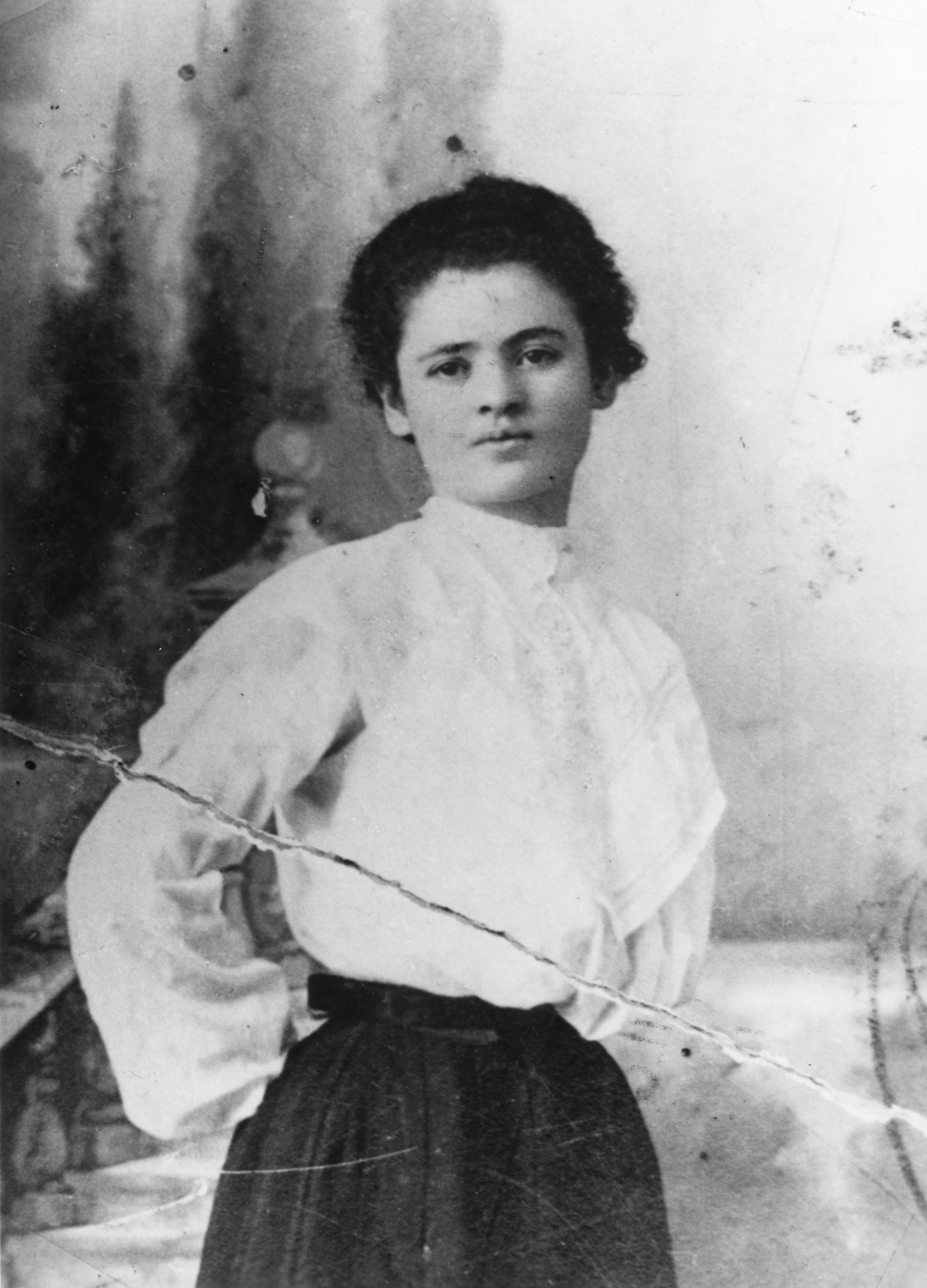
- Lemlich c. 1910
- Born: Clara Lemlich; March 28, 1886; Horodok, Russian Empire
- Died: July 12, 1982 (aged 96); Los Angeles, California, United States
- Occupations: Union organizer, suffragist, activist
- Known for: Leader of the Uprising of the 20,000
- Political party: Communist USA
- Spouse(s): Joe Shavelson (m. 1913; died 1951) Abe Goldman (1960–1967)
- Children: Irving, Martha, and Rita

Clara Lemlich Shavelson (March 28, 1886 – July 12, 1982) was a leader of the Uprising of 20,000, the massive strike of shirtwaist workers in New York's garment industry in 1909, where she spoke in Yiddish and called for action. Later blacklisted from the industry for her labor union work, she became a member of the Communist Party USA and a consumer activist. In her last years as a nursing home resident she helped to organize the staff.

== Early years ==
Lemlich was born March 28, 1886, in the former Russian, now Ukrainian town of Gorodok, to a Jewish family. Raised in a predominantly Yiddish-speaking village, young Lemlich learned to read Russian over her parents' objections, sewing buttonholes and writing letters for illiterate neighbors to raise money for her books. After a neighbor introduced her to revolutionary literature, Lemlich became a committed socialist. She immigrated to the United States with her family in 1903, following a pogrom in Kishinev.

Lemlich was able to find a job in the garment industry upon her arrival in New York. Conditions there had become even worse since the turn of the century, as the new industrial sewing machine allowed employers to demand twice as much production from their employees, who often had to supply their own machines and carry them to and from work. Lemlich, along with many of her co-workers, rebelled against the long hours, low pay, lack of opportunities for advancement, and humiliating treatment from supervisors. Lemlich became involved in the International Ladies' Garment Workers' Union (ILGWU) and was elected to the executive board of Local 25 of the ILGWU.

Lemlich quickly made a name for herself among her fellow workers, leading several strikes of shirtwaist makers and challenging the mostly male leadership of the union to organize women garment workers. She combined boldness with a good deal of charm (she was known for her fine singing voice) and personal bravery (she returned to the picket line in 1909 after having several ribs broken when gangsters hired by the employers attacked the picketers).

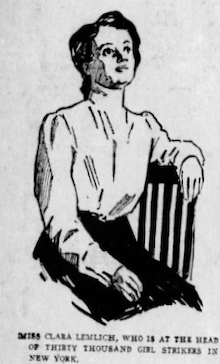
Sketch of Lemlich from a 1909 article in The Kansas City Star, captioned with "Miss Clara Lemlich, who is at the head of thirty thousand girl strikers in New York."

Lemlich came to the attention of the outside world at the mass meeting held at Cooper Union on November 22, 1909 to rally support for the striking shirtwaist workers at the Triangle Shirtwaist Company and Leiserson Company. For two hours the leading figures of the American labor movement and socialist leaders of the Lower East Side spoke in general terms about the need for solidarity and preparedness. Desiring a call to action, not just words, Lemlich demanded the opportunity to speak. Lifted onto the platform, she said:

I have listened to all the speakers, and I have no further patience for talk. I am a working girl, one of those striking against intolerable conditions. I am tired of listening to speakers who talk in generalities. What we are here for is to decide whether or not to strike. I make a motion that we go out in a general strike.

The crowd responded enthusiastically and, after taking a modified version of the ancient Jewish oath of fidelity to Israel — "If I turn traitor to the cause I now pledge, may this hand wither from the arm I now raise" — voted for a general strike. Approximately 20,000 out of the 32,000 workers in the shirtwaist trade walked out in the next two days; this would become known as the Uprising of the 20,000. Lemlich took a leading role in bringing workers out, speaking at rallies until she lost her voice. The strike lasted until February 10, 1910, producing union contracts at almost every shop, but not at Triangle Shirtwaist.

Triangle Shirtwaist became a synonym for "sweatshop" during the following year. On March 25, 1911, nearly 150 garment workers died as a result of a fire that consumed the factory. Workers were either burned to death or died jumping to escape the flames. Lemlich searched through the armory where the dead had been taken to search for a missing cousin; a newspaper reporter described her as convulsed by hysterical laughter and tears when she did not find her.

== Suffrage ==
Blacklisted from the industry and at odds with the conservative leadership of the ILGWU, Lemlich devoted herself to the campaign for women's suffrage. Like her colleagues Rose Schneiderman and Pauline Newman, Lemlich portrayed women's suffrage as necessary for the improvement of working women's lives, both inside and outside the workplace.

The manufacturer has a vote; the bosses have votes; the foremen have votes, the inspectors have votes. The working girl has no vote. When she asks to have a building in which she must work made clean and safe, the officials do not have to listen. When she asks not to work such long hours, they do not have to listen. . . . [U]ntil the men in the Legislature at Albany represent her as well as the bosses and the foremen, she will not get justice; she will not get fair conditions. That is why the working woman now says that she must have the vote.

Lemlich, like Newman and Schneiderman, also had strong personal and political differences with the upper and middle class women who led the suffrage movement. Mary Beard fired Lemlich, for reasons that are not entirely clear, less than a year after hiring her to campaign for suffrage in 1911.

Lemlich continued her suffrage activities, founding the Wage Earner’s Suffrage League, a working class alternative to middle class suffrage organizations, along with Schneiderman, Leonora O'Reilly, and two other women garment workers. Yet while the League admitted only working class women to membership, it was dependent on non-working class women for support and, in deference to its supporters' wishes, affiliated with the National American Woman Suffrage Association — the organization to which it saw itself as an alternative — rather than with the Socialist Party Women's Committee.

The Wage Earner’s Suffrage League passed out of existence, however, after organizing a successful rally at Cooper Union at which Lemlich, Schneiderman, and others spoke. Lemlich continued her suffrage activities for the Women's Trade Union League, while Schneiderman, who quit the WTUL at that time, went to work for the ILGWU before returning to the WTUL several years later. Other activists, such as Pauline Newman, worked under the aegis of the Socialist Party, which supported suffrage even though many in the leadership considered it a distraction from the more urgent business of class struggle.

== Continued advocacy ==
Lemlich married Joe Shavelson in 1913. The couple had three children: Irving Charles Velson, Martha Shavelson Schaffer, and Rita Shavelson Margules. Moving to the solidly working-class neighborhood of East New York, then later to Brighton Beach, she did not return to work, other than on an occasional part-time basis, for the next thirty years. Instead she devoted herself to raising a family and organizing housewives.

Others had organized in this area before Lemlich: Jewish housewives in New York had boycotted kosher butchers to protest high prices in the first decade of the twentieth century and the Brooklyn Tenants Union led rent strikes and fought evictions. After joining the Communist Party, which largely disdained the notion of consumer organizing, Lemlich and Kate Gitlow, mother of Benjamin Gitlow, attempted to organize a union of housewives that would address not only consumers' issues, but housing and education as well. The United Council of Working Class Housewives also raised money and organized relief for strikers in Passaic, New Jersey during the bitter 1926 strike.

In 1929, after the Communist Party created a Women's Commission, Lemlich launched the United Council of Working-Class Women (UCWW), which eventually had nearly fifty branches in New York City, as well as affiliates in Philadelphia, Seattle, Chicago, Los Angeles, San Francisco, and Detroit. The organization recruited among CP members, but did not identify the Council with the CP or press non-Party members of the Council to join the party as well.

The UCWW led a widespread boycott of butcher shops to protest high meat prices in 1935, using the militant tactics of flying squadrons of picketers that shut down more than 4,000 butcher shops in New York City. The strike became nationwide and the UCWW won support outside the Jewish and African-American communities to which it had been limited in New York.

The UCWW renamed itself the Progressive Women's Councils the following years as part of the Popular Front politics of the day. The Party withdrew support for the councils and discontinued publications aimed at women, however, in 1938. Lemlich continued to be active in the PWC, however, and was a local leader in it after it affiliated with the International Worker's Order in the 1940s. The Councils organized even broader boycotts to protest high prices in 1948 and 1951, before accusations of Communist Party dominance destroyed it in the early 1950s. The IWO was ordered dissolved by the state of New York in 1952.

Lemlich continued her activities as part of the Emma Lazarus Federation of Jewish Women's Clubs, which raised funds for Magen David Adom, protested nuclear weapons, campaigned for ratification of the United Nations' Convention on Genocide, opposed the War in Vietnam, and forged alliances with Sojourners for Truth, an African-American women's civil rights organization.

Lemlich was also active in Unemployed Councils activities and in founding the Emma Lazarus Council, which supported tenant rights. The Emma Lazarus Council declared in 1931 that no one would be evicted in Brighton Beach for inability to pay rent, then backed that up by rallying supporters to prevent evictions and returning tenants' furniture to their apartments in those cases in which authorities attempted to effect eviction.

Lemlich remained an unwavering member of the Communist Party, denouncing the trial and execution of the Rosenbergs. Her passport was revoked after a trip to the Soviet Union in 1951. She retired from garment work in 1954, then fought a long battle with the ILGWU to obtain a pension. In 1960, she married Abe Goldman, an old labor movement acquaintance. After Goldman's death in 1967, she moved to California to be near her children and in-laws. At age 81, she entered the Jewish Home for the Aged in Los Angeles. As a resident, she persuaded the management to join in the United Farm Workers boycotts of grapes and lettuce and helped the orderlies there to organize a labor union.

== Namesake ==
The Clara Lemlich Awards, given annually since 2010, “honor women who have been working for the larger good their entire lives, in the tradition of those who sparked so many reforms in the aftermath of the Triangle Shirtwaist Factory fire over one hundred years ago”.
