= Mink brigade =

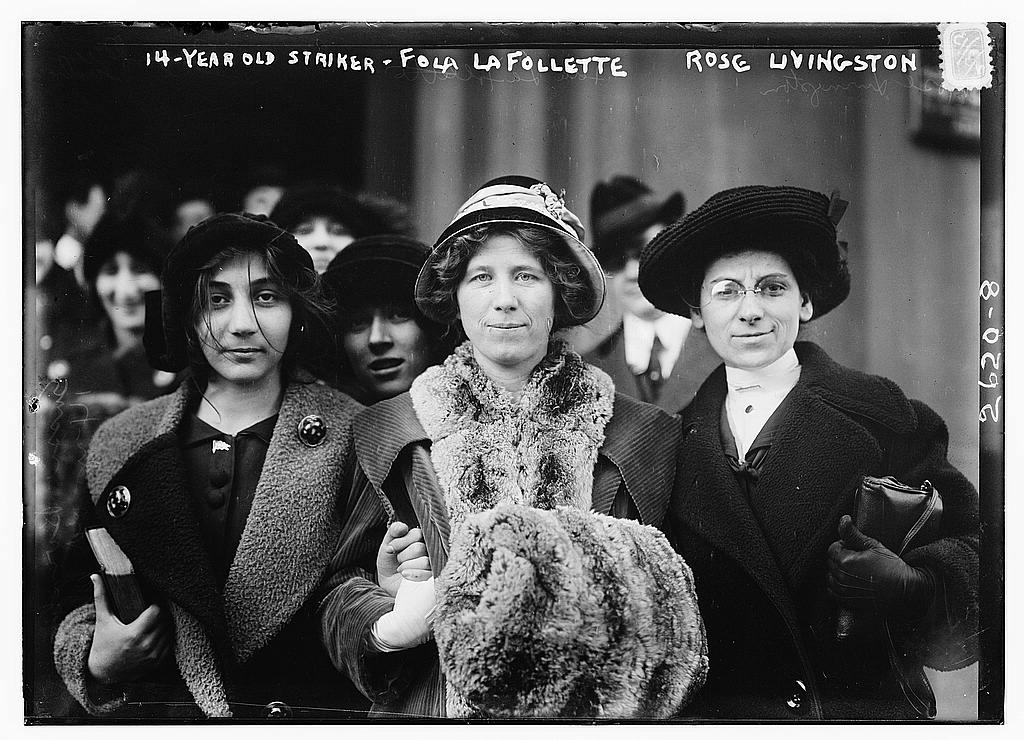
Unidentified striker, Fola La Follette and Rose Livingston

The mink brigade was a name used, at first mockingly, to refer to wealthy or otherwise socially privileged women who supported striking workers in the United States.

== History ==
Anne Morgan, Alva Belmont and other wealthy strike supporters gained the attention of the press who labeled them the "mink brigade" during the New York shirtwaist strike of 1909. The phrase was used again to refer to other women strike supporters, such as Fola La Follette in the 1913 New York Garment Workers Strike, to describe women whose dress and social status would give police pause in arresting them.
