= Constance Smith (civil servant) =

English novelist and civil servant (1859 – 1930)

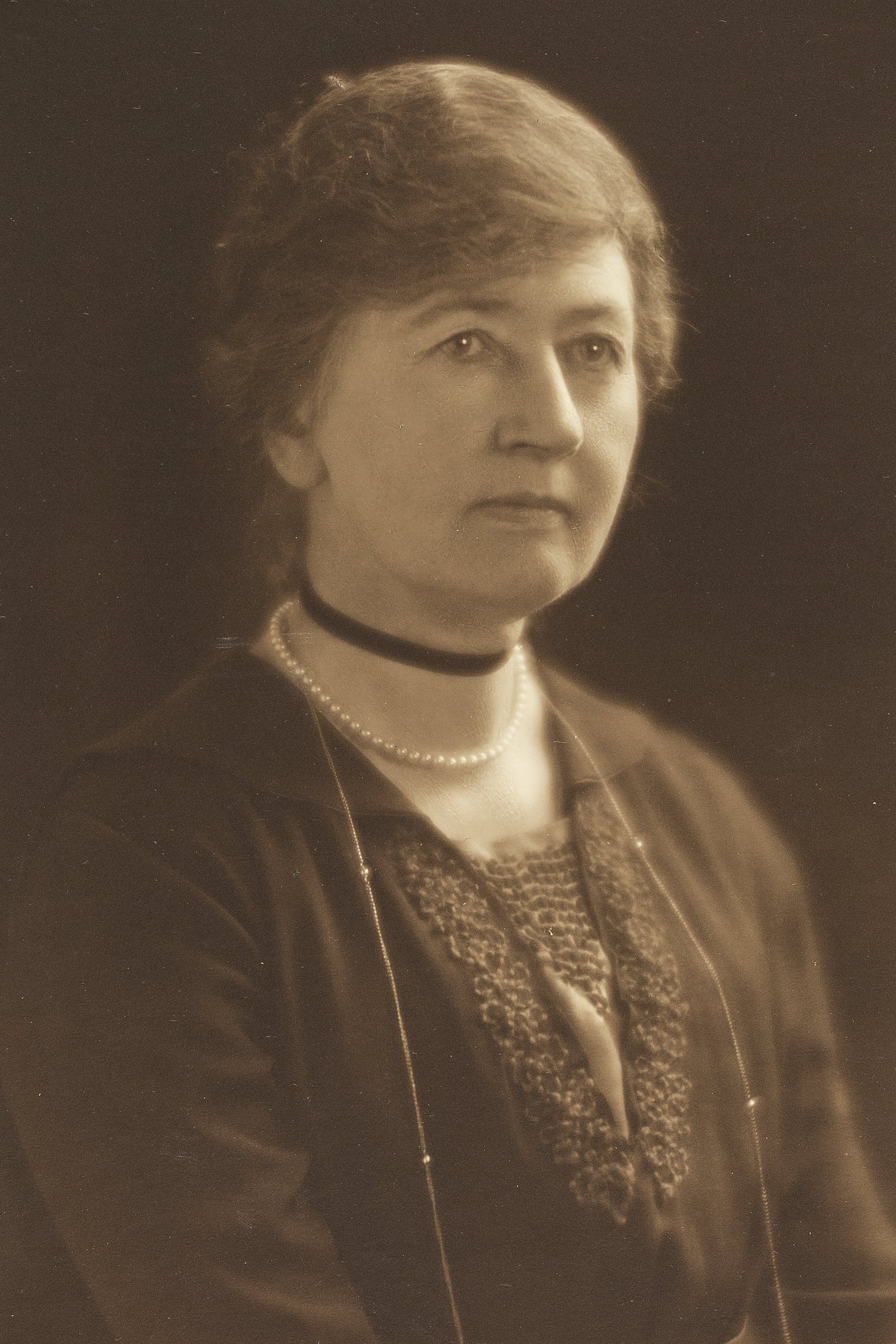
- portrait
- Born: Constance Isabella Stuart Smith; 16 June, 1859; London
- Died: 26 March, 1930; England?
- Education: King's College, London
- Occupations: Novelist and civil servant

Constance Smith (born as Constance Isabella Stuart Smith) (1859 – 1930) was an English novelist and civil servant who published on working conditions and labour legislation.

== Early life ==
Smith was born in London on 16 June 1859 to Reverend Hinton C. Smith and educated in Belgium; Germany; and King's College, London.

== Career ==
Between 1889 and 1901, Smith authored nine novels.

From 1913 onwards, Smith served in several capacities as a civil servant inspecting labour conditions for women and children and in factories. She received an OBE for her work. In 1926, she received a Civil Pension 'in recognition of her valuable services in promoting and advancing social welfare.'

Smith published The Case for Wages Boards in 1905 and collaborated with other women social workers including Gertrude Tuckwell, who wrote her memoir.

== Administrative titles ==
- HM Senior Lady Inspector of Factories, 1913–21
- Joint Secretary of Women's Employment Committee (Ministry of Reconstruction), 1917–19
- HM Deputy Chief Inspector of Factories, 1921–25
- Technical Adviser to British Government Delegates at First Conference of International Labour Organisation, Washington, 1919, and Fifth Conference, Geneva, 1923
- Joint Hon. Secretary Committee on Wage-earning Children
- Member of the Industrial Law Committee
- Four times a British Delegate to the Biennial Conference of International Association for Labour Legislation

== Bibliography ==
=== Fiction ===
The Case for Wages Boards tome

- The Repentance of Paul Wentworth (1889)
- The Riddle of Lawrence Haviland (1890)
- One Way of Love (1892)
- A Cumberer of the Ground (1894)
- The Backslider: A Story of Today (1896)
- Prisoners of Hope (1898)
- Love Hath Wings (1899)
- The Magic Word (1900)
- Corban (1901)

=== Non-fiction ===
As well as numerous journal and periodical articles, Smith authored:

- The Case for Wages Boards (1905)
- (with Gertrude Tuckwell) The Workers' Handbook (1908)
- (with Gertrude M. Tuckwell, Mary R. MacArthur, May Tennant, Nettie Adler, Adelaide Mary Anderson, and Clementina Black) Women in Industry from Seven Points of View (1909)
