= Harry Schneiderman =

Polish-born Jewish-American communal administrator and editor

- Born: January 23, 1885; Sawin, Lublin, Poland
- Died: September 1, 1975 (aged 90); New York City, New York, USA
- Education: College of the City of New York
- Spouse: Tillie Saymon (m. 1917)
- Children: 3
- Relatives: Rose Schneiderman (sister)

Harry Schneiderman (January 23, 1885 – September 1, 1975) was a Polish-born Jewish-American communal administrator and editor.

== Early life and education ==
Schneiderman was born on January 23, 1885, in Sawin, Congress Poland, the son of Samuel Schneiderman and Deborah Rothman. His sister was labor leader Rose Schneiderman.

Schneiderman immigrated to America in 1890. He was a ward of the Hebrew Orphan Asylum of New York from 1893 to 1904, and worked as a teacher in its religious department from 1905 to 1908. He graduated from New York City public school in 1901 and from the College of the City of New York with a B.S. in 1908. He also received an elementary and intermediate Jewish education.

== Career ==
In 1908, he joined the American Jewish Committee as assistant to its secretary, Herbert Friedenwald, on the recommendation of Solomon Lowenstein (the executive director of the Hebrew Orphan Asylum). In 1914, when Friedenwald's successor as secretary Herman Bernstein resigned, Schneiderman was appointed assistant secretary and served as acting secretary for the next fourteen years until Morris D. Waldman was appointed secretary. He collaborated in preparing the American Jewish Year Book since he joined the American Jewish Committee, and in 1920 he became its editor. He wrote several special articles for the Year Book, and from 1928 to 1936 he wrote its "Review of the Year." He also took a directing part in expanding the committee's cultural activities beginning in 1933.

Schneiderman edited the American Jewish Year Book until 1948 He also edited the Contemporary Jewish Record from 1938 to 1945. He wrote for the Jewish Tribune from 1923 to 1928. He was assistant secretary director of the American Jewish Committee's Library of Jewish Information from 1914 to 1945. He co-founded the Jewish Book Council of America and served as its vice-president from 1947 until his death. He was co-chairman of the American advisory board of the 1959 Standard Jewish Encyclopedia, and was a publications committee member of the Jewish Publication Society, the American Jewish Historical Society, and the Conference on Jewish Relations. He served as secretary of the Emergency Committee for Jewish Refugees from 1924 to 1928. He translated works from Joseph Samuel Bloch, Chayim Block, and Reuben Rotgeisser. He contributed to Our Racial and National Minorities in 1937, One America in 1945, the Universal Jewish Encyclopedia, and the American Year Book. He wrote The Jewish in American History between 1922 and 1923 and The Jews of Nazi Germany: A Handbook of Facts Regarding their Present Situation in 1935. He was also chairman of the editorial board of Who's Who in World Jewry in 1955 and 1965.

== Personal life ==
In 1917, Schneiderman married Tillie Saymon. Their children were Herbert, Florence Dobrer, and Lois King.

Schneiderman died in the Jewish Home and Hospital for the Aged on September 1, 1975.
