= New York shirtwaist strike of 1909 =

Labor strike

New York Shirtwaist Strike of 1909 (Uprising of the 20,000)
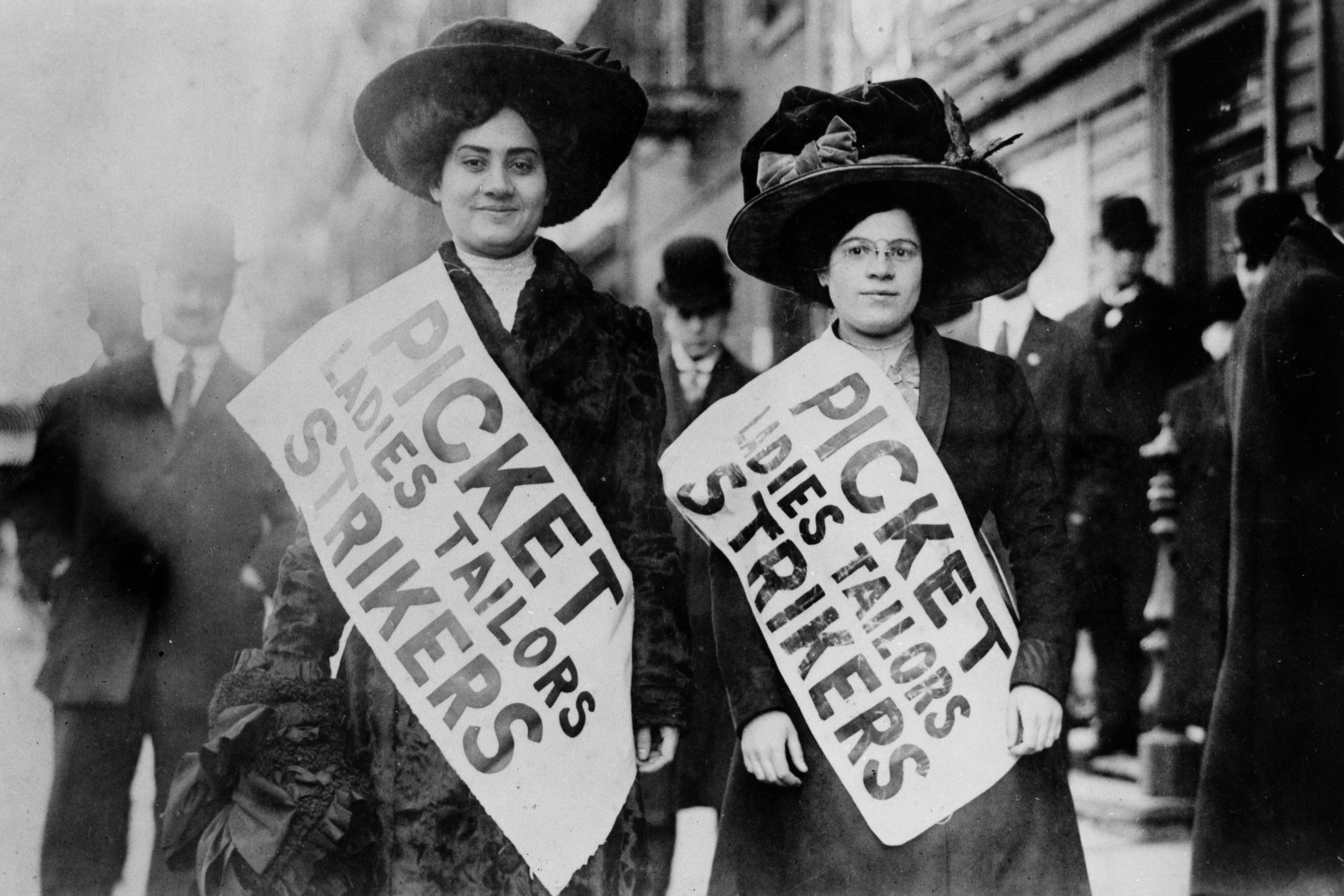
- Two women strikers picketing during the strike
- Date: November 1909–March 1910
- Location: New York City
- Result: Successful renegotiation of garment worker contracts

Parties
International Ladies' Garment Workers' Union; Women's Trade Union League	Shirtwaist industry

Lead figures
Clara Lemlich	

Casualties
- Deaths: 5
- Injuries: 104
- Charged: 10%
- Fined: 4.5$

The New York shirtwaist strike of 1909, also known as the Uprising of the 20,000, was a labour strike primarily involving Jewish women working in New York shirtwaist factories. It was the largest strike by female American workers up to that date. Led by Clara Lemlich and the International Ladies' Garment Workers' Union, and supported by the National Women's Trade Union League of America (NWTUL), the strike began in November 1909.

In February 1910, the NWTUL settled with the factory owners, gaining improved wages, working conditions, and hours. The end of the strike was followed only a year later by the Triangle Shirtwaist Factory fire, which exposed the plight of immigrant women working in dangerous and difficult conditions.

== Background ==
During the 20th century, American textile workers of all categories—and female textile workers in particular—were subjected to abysmal working conditions, marked by crowded, unsanitary facilities, long work days, and miserable wages. Production in the garment-making capital of New York City during the first decade of the century was split between 600 shops and factories, employing 30,000 workers and producing an estimated $50 million worth of merchandise annually.

Women were frequently trapped by an internal subcontracting system, which made extensive use of home work and additionally limited entry into skilled "operator" positions by relegating many to the ranks of "learners"—a category of convenience which had little correlation to actual level of skill or experience. These so-called "learners" often earned no more than $3 or $4 a day—a small fraction of the typical wages of $7 to $12 made by semi-skilled "operators," who were generally male. At the top of the garment industry hierarchy were the skilled pattern-makers and cutters, who were almost exclusively male.

Garment industry workers often worked in small sweatshops. Work weeks of 65 hours were normal, and in season they might expand to as many as 75 hours. Despite their meager wages, workers were often required to supply their own basic materials, including needles, thread, and sewing machines. Workers could be fined for being late for work or for damaging a garment they were working on. At some worksites, such as the Triangle Shirtwaist Company, steel doors were used to lock in workers so as to prevent workers from taking breaks, and as a result women had to ask permission from supervisors to use the restroom.

The industry was dominated by immigrant workers, including prominently Yiddish-speaking Jews, about half of the total, and Italians, who comprised another one-third. About 70% of the workforce was female, about half of whom were under 20 years old.

In the production of shirtwaists (blouses) in particular, the workforce was nearly all Jewish women. Some of them had belonged to labour unions in Europe before their immigration; many of the Jewish women in particular had been members of the Bund. Thus, they were no strangers to organized labour or to its tactics. Indeed, Jewish women who worked in the garment industry were among the most vocal and active supporters of women's suffrage in New York.

== Strike ==
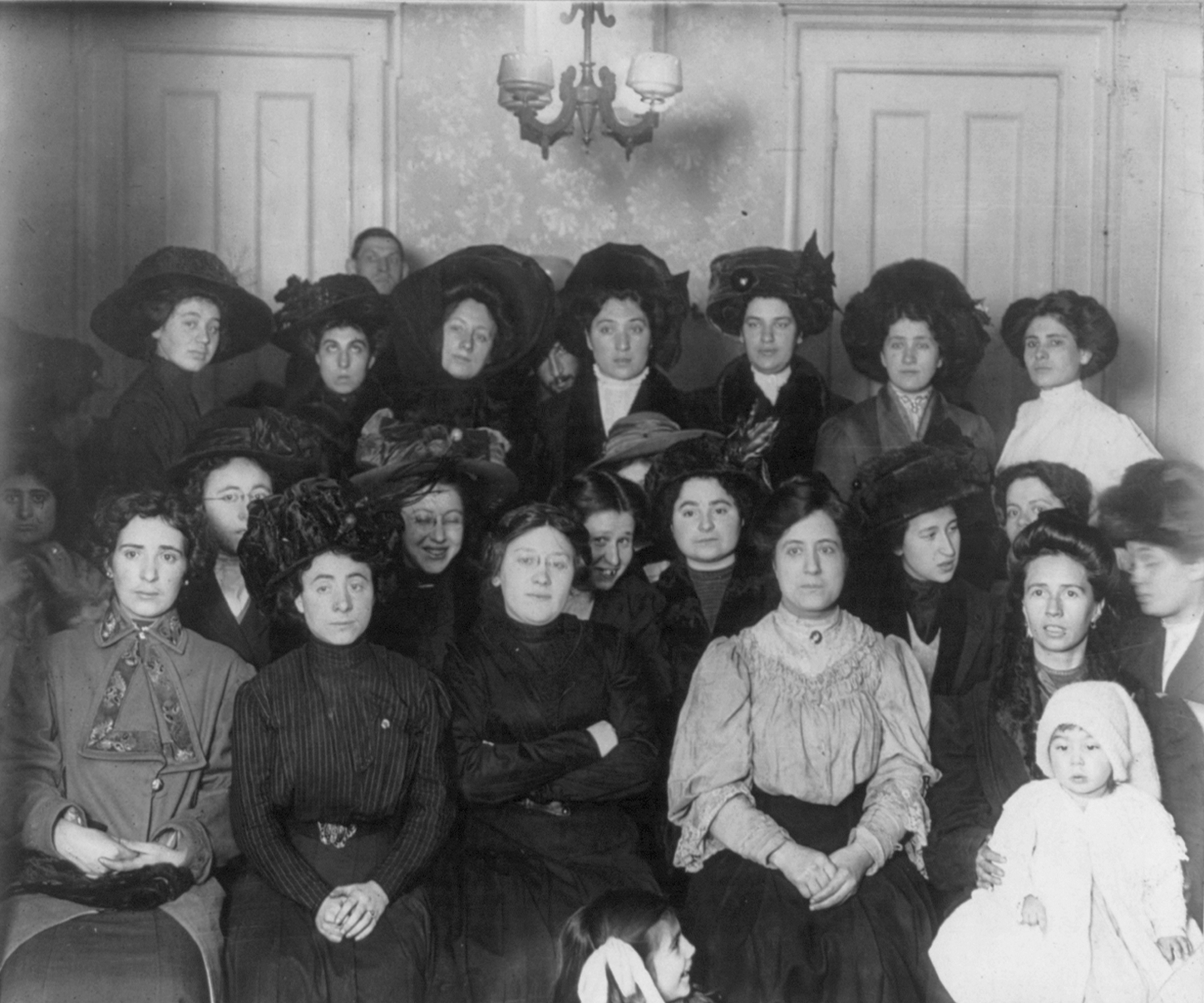
A January 1910 photograph of a group of women who participated in the shirtwaist strike of 1909

In September 1909, employees at the Triangle Shirtwaist Factory went on strike. On November 22, 1909, a meeting was held at the Great Hall of Cooper Union, where Local 25 voted for a general strike. The meeting had been organized by International Ladies Garment Workers Union and was chaired by Socialist Benjamin Feigenbaum.

In attendance at the meeting was Clara Lemlich, a 23-year old garment worker, originally from Ukraine. Lemlich was already on strike, and she had been hospitalized after hired thugs assaulted her on the picket line. At the meeting, Lemlich had been listening to men speak about the disadvantages and cautions about the shirtwaist workers going on a general strike. After listening to these men speak for four or more hours, she rose and declared in Yiddish that she wanted to say a few words of her own. After rising to the podium, she declared that the shirtwaist workers would go on a general strike. She said, "I have no further patience for talk. I move we go on a general strike!” Her declaration received a standing ovation and the audience went wild. Clara then took an oath swearing that if she became a traitor to the cause she now voted for, then that the hand she now held high wither from her arm.

On the 24th of November, less than one day after the strike had been declared, 15,000 shirtwaist workers walked out of the factories, with more joining the strike the following day. The numbers swelled to 20,000 to 30,000 strikers, and the strike became known as the Uprising of the 20,000. Most of the strikers were young women between the ages of sixteen and twenty-five years old. 75%-80% were Eastern European Jewish immigrants and 6-10% were Italian immigrants.

Strikers protested against long work hours and low wages. They demanded a 20 percent pay raise, a 52 hour work week, additional payment for overtime hours, and improved safety conditions.

The factory owners, Max Blanck and Isaac Harris, were vehemently anti-union and did not accept the demands. Instead, they hired thugs and prostitutes to assault the strikers. Meanwhile, the thugs bribed police officers so that strikers would be arrested for minor infringements.

The strikers gained sympathy from many upper class women of New York society, also known as the "mink brigade." Many of these women belonged to the Colony Club, an exclusive club that did not admit Jews, which made the alliance unexpected. Members of the "mink brigade" included Anne Tracy Morgan, the daughter of J.P. Morgan, and Alva Belmont, the former wife of William Kissam Vanderbilt. In 1908, Morgan had begun organizing a women's auxiliary group for the National Civic Federation, which aimed to improve the working conditions for women. By 1909, when the shirtwaist strike had broken out, the "mink brigade" was able to connect with the strikers through the Women’s Trade Union League (WTUL). The WTUL aimed to unite working-class women with middle-class women (who were known as "allies"). The union put members of the "mink brigade" into the picket line alongside the striking workers. When the upper-class women were arrested alongside the striking workers, the arrests made front-page news (which did not occur when the strike only included working-class women). Belmont rented New York Hippodrome for a rally in support of the workers, and wealthy women donated in support of the cause. However, some activists and newspapers, such as The Call (a socialist newspaper), criticized the hypocrisy and prejudice of the wealthy women who supported the strike.

The strike lasted until February 1910 and ended in a "Protocol of peace," which allowed the strikers to go back to work. Many of the demands of the workers had been met, including better pay, shorter hours, and equal treatment of workers who were in the union and workers who were not. However, Blanck and Harris refused to make an agreement with the union, and they did not address key safety concerns, such as locked doors and condemned fire escapes in the work place.

== Legacy ==
The successful strike marked an important benchmark for the American labour movement, and especially for garment industry unions. The strike helped transform industrial worker culture and activism in the United States. However, the triumph of the strike was later overshadowed by the tragedy of the Triangle Shirtwaist Factory Fire in March 1911.

The strike inspired Clara Zetkin to propose an International Women's Day, which was first celebrated by the Socialist Party of America in 1909.

== See also ==
- Triangle Shirtwaist Factory fire of 1911
- Clara Lemlich
- Rose Schneiderman
- Fannia Cohn
- ILGWU
- Carola Woerishoffer
- 1907 New York City Rent Strike
