= Women's Trade Union League =

U.S. labor rights organization (1903–1950)

- Women's Trade Union League
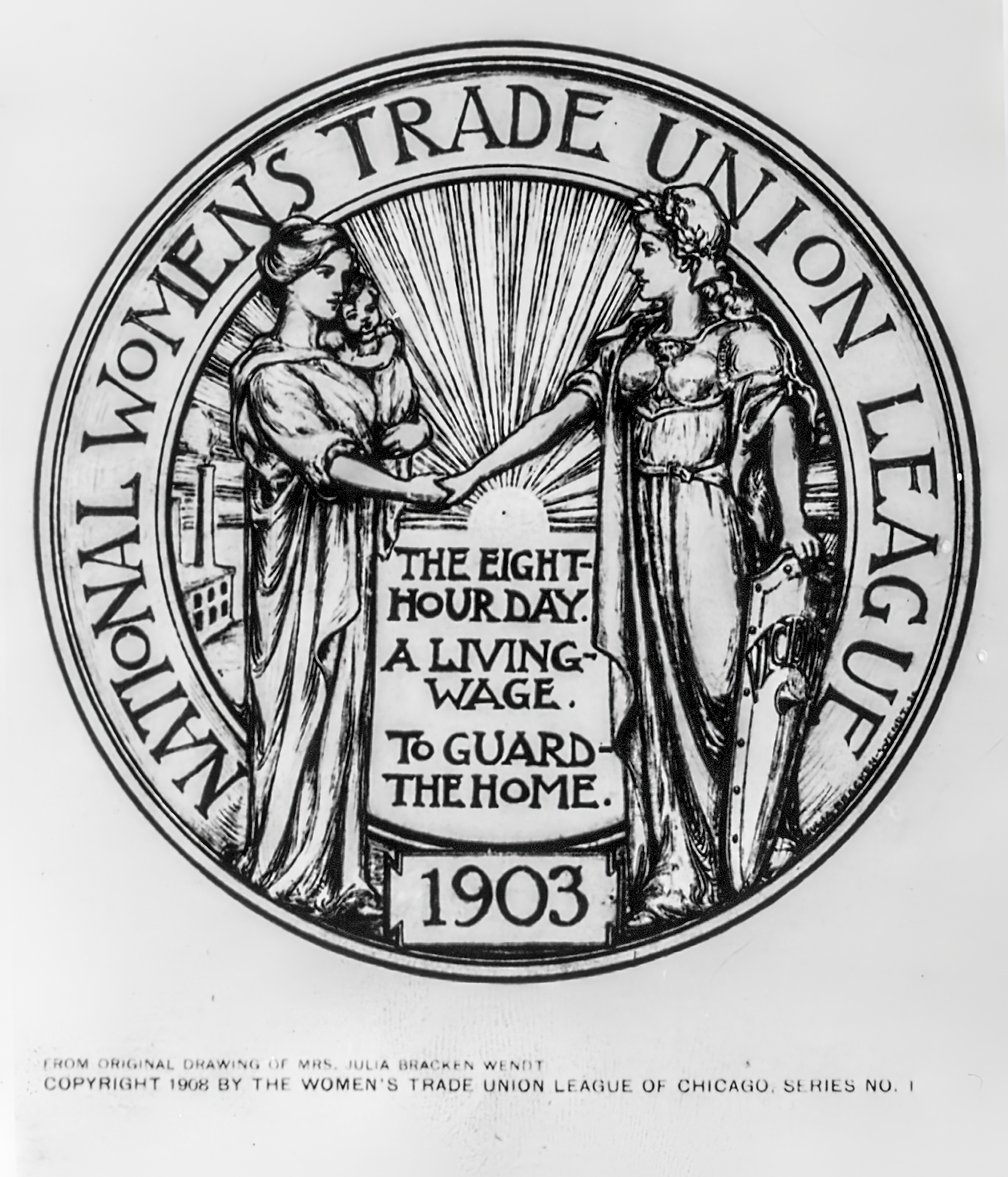

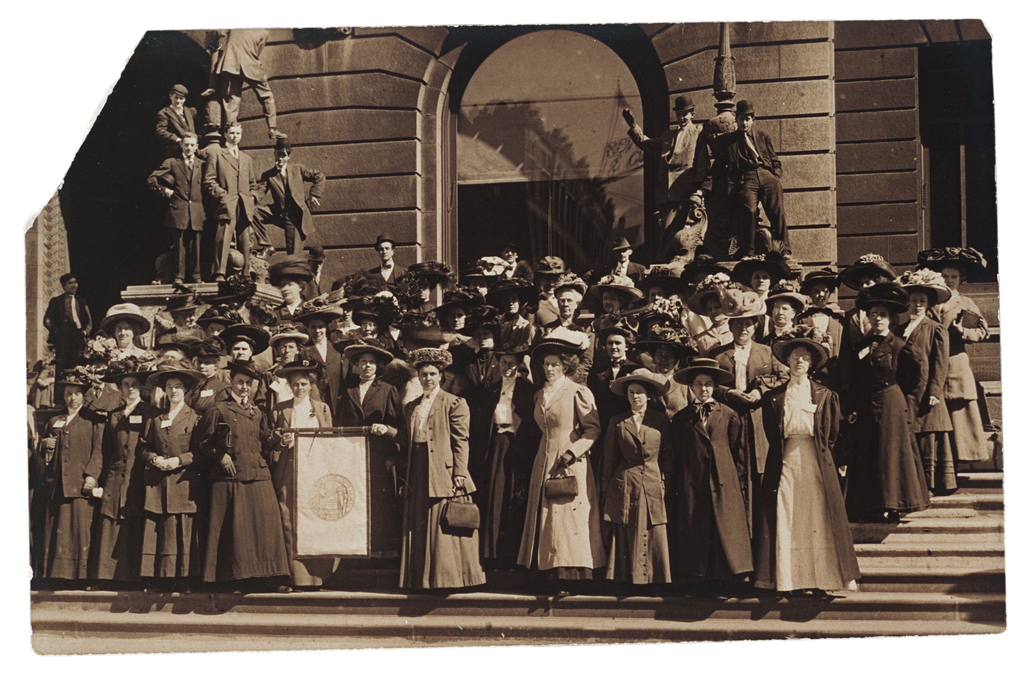
- New York City, 1909
- Founded: 1903
- Dissolved: 1950
- Location: United States
- Key people: Margaret Dreier Robins, President
- Parent organization: American Federation of Labor

The Women's Trade Union League (WTUL) (1903–1950) was a U.S. organization of both working class and more well-off women to support the efforts of women to organize labor unions and to eliminate sweatshop conditions. The WTUL played an important role in supporting the massive strikes in the first two decades of the twentieth century that established the International Ladies' Garment Workers' Union and Amalgamated Clothing Workers of America and in campaigning for women's suffrage among men and women workers.

== Origins ==
The roots of the WTUL can be traced back to the settlement house movement, which brought together middle and upper class reformers with working class women to live in settlement houses in an effort to provide them assistance. However, reformers began to notice the constraints of this system. One of these reformers, American Socialist William English Walling, was the first to take note of the British WTUL. Working in settlement houses in Chicago and New York, he had come to the conclusion that the unionization of working class women was the future of the reform movement. In 1903, he went to England to study the British WTUL directly, which was founded in 1874. Later that year, Walling returned to America, attending the Annual American Federation of Labor (AFL) convention. It was here that the organization was created, with its first president being Mary Morton Kehew, a labor and social reformer from Boston, and vice president Jane Addams of Chicago's Hull House.

Due to the nature of its very inception, the WTUL was inexorably intertwined with the AFL, and spent much of its early years trying to cultivate ties with the AFL leadership. Without the approval of organized labor, the WTUL would not succeed, and the AFL being the biggest player meant that, for the League's purposes, the two were one and the same. Despite many of their organizers having previously worked for or with the AFL at some point, the AFL leadership generally ignored the League. Still, the League did push the AFL towards a pro-suffrage position and did manage to organize more women into the Federation than at any previous time. The relationship between the two organizations was marred with inconsistency, "marked by both moments of embrace and dismissal."

In the early years, it was important to the WTUL to establish a primary mission and central concerns and issues to focus on. Chief among these was the League's dedication to organizing women into trade unions and ensuring successful collective bargaining for them. The WTUL also emphasized the passing of labor standardization legislation as well as promoting the education of women in the workforce.

The WTUL counted a diverse group of people amongst their ranks, from educated women reformers of a mostly white, Protestant, and native-born background, to young women workers which included a large number of immigrants, namely Jews, Italians, and Irish. Among the more affluent of their numbers were figures like Eleanor Roosevelt, Jane Addams, Florence Kelly, Margaret Dreier Robins, and Mary Morton Kehew, while the working class members of the WTUL included figures like Mary Kenney O'Sullivan, Rose Schneiderman, Pauline Newman, Fannia Cohn, and Clara Lemlich.

The heyday of the League came between 1907 and 1922 under the presidency of Margaret Dreier Robins. During that period, the WTUL led the drive to organize women workers into unions, secured protective legislation, and educated the public on the problems and needs of working women.

== Support for union organizing ==
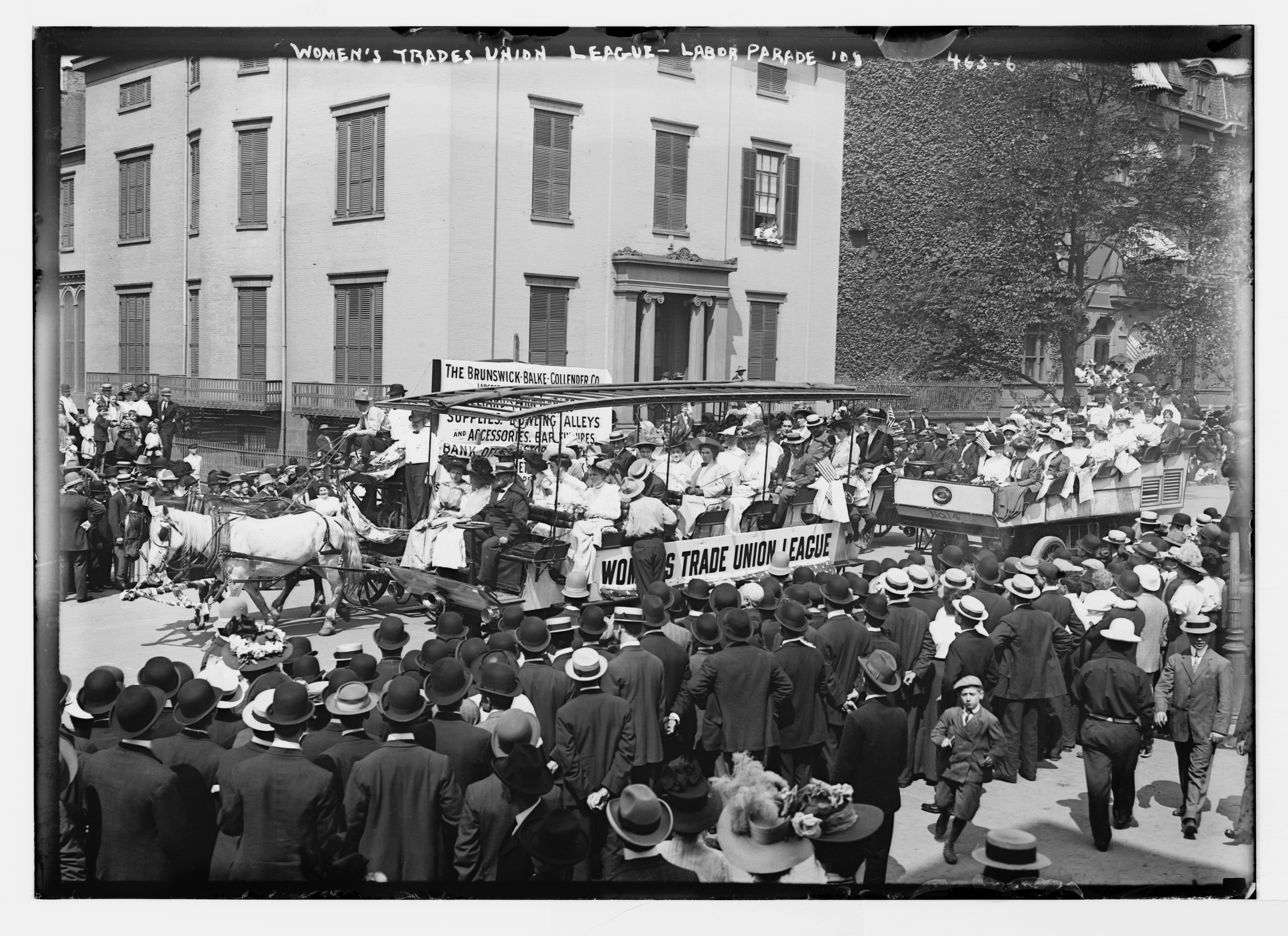
WTUL float, Labor Day parade, New York, 1908

The League supported a number of strikes in the first few years of its existence, including the 1907 telegrapher's strike organized by the Commercial Telegraphers Union of America. The WTUL played a critical role in supporting the Uprising of the 20,000, the New York City and Philadelphia shirtwaist workers' strike, by providing a headquarters for the strike, raising money for relief funds, soup kitchens and bail for picketers, providing witnesses and legal defense for arrested picketers, joining the strikers on the picket line, and organizing mass meetings and marches to publicize the shirtwaist workers' demands and the sweatshop conditions they were fighting. Rose Schneiderman in particular led efforts during the great garment strike of 1909. Working with the League's New York City branch, the NYWTUL, she was able to successfully organize over one-hundred shirtwaist makers, coordinated events which helped fund the strike, and persuaded women to join their local branch of the International Ladies' Garment Workers' Union (ILGWU). Some observers made light of the upper-class women members of the WTUL who picketed alongside garment workers, calling them the "mink brigade". Furthermore, Schneiderman's Socialist views and actions during the strike also highlighted the tenuous relationship between the wage earners and the middle-class women which made up the WTUL. These distinctions split strikers from their upper-class benefactors as well: a contingent of strikers challenged Alva Belmont concerning her reasons for supporting the strike.

The strike was, however, less than wholly successful: Italian workers crossed the picket lines in large numbers and the strikers lacked the resources to hold out longer than the employers. In addition, although activists within the WTUL, including William E. Walling and Lillian D. Wald, were also among the founders of the NAACP that year and fought the employers' plan to use African-American strikebreakers to defeat the strike, others in the black community actively encouraged black workers to cross the picket lines. Even so, the strike produced some limited gains for workers, while giving both the WTUL and women garment workers a practical education in organizing.

1st International Congress of Working Women called by the National Women's Trade Union League of America, Washington, D.C., October 28, 1919

The garment strikes did not end in New York City, as Chicago too became embroiled in the trend. From 1910 to 1911, the Chicago branch of the WTUL helped organize the garment workers' strike against Hart, Schaffner and Marx (HSM). The CWTUL helped coordinate 20,000 women in the strike and, in the end, accomplished their goal of improved standards in the workplace.

The WTUL was also active in cities like Boston, where the League's local branch was involved in a flurry of activism. In 1914, the BWTUL organized the downtown office cleaners into a union which was recognized and chartered by the AFL. In 1915, it worked directly with the AFL on behalf of candy workers in the city. During the campaign, the BWTUL was able to significantly increase wages for the workers, though not without some clash with the AFL. Five years later, in 1920, the BWTUL followed up on this success by organizing a union for predominately marginalized service workers, mostly young women who worked at newsstands.

The NYWTUL also continued its organizing into the 1930s, helping organize strikes against Sunshine Laundry in Williamsburg, Brooklyn and Colonial Laundry in Bedford-Stuyvesant. The former employed mostly white women, while the latter predominantly African-American women. The WTUL strike came to both groups' aid, helping organize a population which had been historically on the outside of labor organization. The strikes were conducted to protest the employers' inaction in raising the minimum wage from 14–15 cents an hour to the NRA-mandated 31 cents. Engaging in long periods of protesting and picketing, the activists of the WTUL were subjected to brutalization by both police and strikebreakers, in addition to the harsh New York winter. Indeed, conditions were so bad that First Lady Eleanor Roosevelt (herself a member of the NYWTUL since 1922) personally provided members of the Secret Service to help protect strikers and prevent unlawful conduct by police and strikebreakers.

The WTUL played a similar role in the strike of mostly male cloakmakers in New York City and men clothing workers in Chicago in 1910, in the 1911 garment workers strike in Cleveland and in many other actions in Iowa, Massachusetts, Missouri and Wisconsin. By 1912, however, the WTUL began to distance itself from the labor movement, supporting strike action selectively when it approved of the leadership's strategy and criticizing the male-dominated leadership of the ILGWU that it saw as unrepresentative of women workers. The WTUL's semi-official relationship with the American Federation of Labor was also strained when the United Textile Workers, an AFL affiliate, insisted that it stop providing relief for Lawrence, Massachusetts textile workers who refused to return to work during the strike led by the Industrial Workers of the World; some WTUL leaders complied, while others refused, denouncing both the AFL and the WTUL for its acquiescence in strikebreaking activities.

The League had a closer relationship with the Amalgamated Clothing Workers of America, the union formed by the most militant locals of mostly immigrant workers in the men's clothing industry in Chicago, New York and other eastern urban centers, which was outside the AFL. The WTUL trained women as labor leaders and organizers at its school founded in Chicago in 1914 and played a key role in bringing Italian garment workers into the union in New York.

== Support for legislative reforms ==
At this time the WTUL also began to work for legislative reforms, in particular the eight-hour day, the minimum wage and protective legislation. Because of the hostility of the United States Supreme Court toward economic legislation at the time, only legislation that singled out women and children for special protections survived challenges to its constitutionality. Samuel Gompers and the conservative leadership of the AFL also viewed such legislation with hostility, but for a different reason: they believed by that point that legislation of this sort interfered with collective bargaining, both by usurping the role of unions in obtaining better wages and working conditions and in setting a precedent for governmental intrusion into the area.

The WTUL was also active in demanding safe working conditions, both before and after the Triangle Shirtwaist Factory fire in 1911 in which 146 workers were killed. That fire, which had been preceded by a similar fire in Newark, New Jersey in which twenty-five garment workers were killed, not only galvanized public opinion on the subject, but also exposed the fissures between the League's well-heeled supporters and its working class militants, such as Rose Schneiderman. As Schneiderman said in her speech at the memorial meeting held in the Metropolitan Opera House on April 2, 1911:

I would be a traitor to these poor burned bodies if I came here to talk good fellowship. We have tried you good people of the public and we have found you wanting. The old Inquisition had its rack and its thumbscrews and its instruments of torture with iron teeth. We know what these things are today; the iron teeth are our necessities, the thumbscrews are the high-powered and swift machinery close to which we must work, and the rack is here in the firetrap structures that will destroy us the minute they catch on fire.

This is not the first time girls have been burned alive in the city. Every week I must learn of the untimely death of one of my sister workers. Every year thousands of us are maimed. The life of men and women is so cheap and property is so sacred. There are so many of us for one job it matters little if 146 of us are burned to death.

We have tried you citizens; we are trying you now, and you have a couple of dollars for the sorrowing mothers, brothers and sisters by way of a charity gift. But every time the workers come out in the only way they know to protest against conditions which are unbearable the strong hand of the law is allowed to press down heavily upon us.

Public officials have only words of warning to us – warning that we must be intensely peaceable, and they have the workhouse just back of all their warnings. The strong hand of the law beats us back, when we rise, into the conditions that make life unbearable.

I can't talk fellowship to you who are gathered here. Too much blood has been spilled. I know from my experience it is up to the working people to save themselves. The only way they can save themselves is by a strong working-class movement.

The WTUL also began to work actively for women's suffrage, in close coalition with the National American Woman Suffrage Association, in the years before passage of the Nineteenth Amendment to the United States Constitution in 1920. The WTUL saw suffrage as a way to gain protective legislation for women and to provide them with the dignity and other less tangible benefits that followed from political equality. Schneiderman coined an evocative phrase in campaigning for suffrage in 1912:

What the woman who labors wants is the right to live, not simply exist – the right to life as the rich woman has the right to life, and the sun and music and art. You have nothing that the humblest worker has not a right to have also. The worker must have bread, but she must have roses, too. Help, you women of privilege, give her the ballot to fight with.

Her phrase "bread and roses", recast as "We want bread and roses too", became the slogan of the largely immigrant, largely women workers of the 1912 Lawrence textile strike.

The WTUL was, on the other hand, mistrustful of the National Woman's Party, with its more individualistic, rights-oriented approach to woman's equality. The WTUL was strongly opposed to the Equal Rights Amendment drafted by the NWP after the passage of the Nineteenth Amendment on the ground that it would undo the protective legislation that the WTUL had fought so hard to obtain.

The WTUL focused increasingly on legislation in the 1920s and thereafter. Its leadership, in particular Schneiderman, were supporters of the New Deal and had a particularly close connection to the Roosevelt administration through Eleanor Roosevelt, a member of the WTUL since 1923. The WTUL dissolved in 1950.

A related organization was the Women's Education and Industrial Union (WEIU), which employed female researchers such as Louise Marion Bosworth to research the working conditions of women.

== See also ==
- Josephine Casey, charter member
- Julia O'Connor, President of Boston WTUL (1915–1918)
- Melinda Scott, President of New York WTUL (1910s)
- Emma Steghagen, officer of WTUL in Chicago
- Mary McEnerney, officer of WTUL in Chicago
- Timeline of women's suffrage
- Timeline of women's legal rights (other than voting)
- Women's suffrage organizations
