= Rose Schneiderman =

American labor leader (1882–1972)

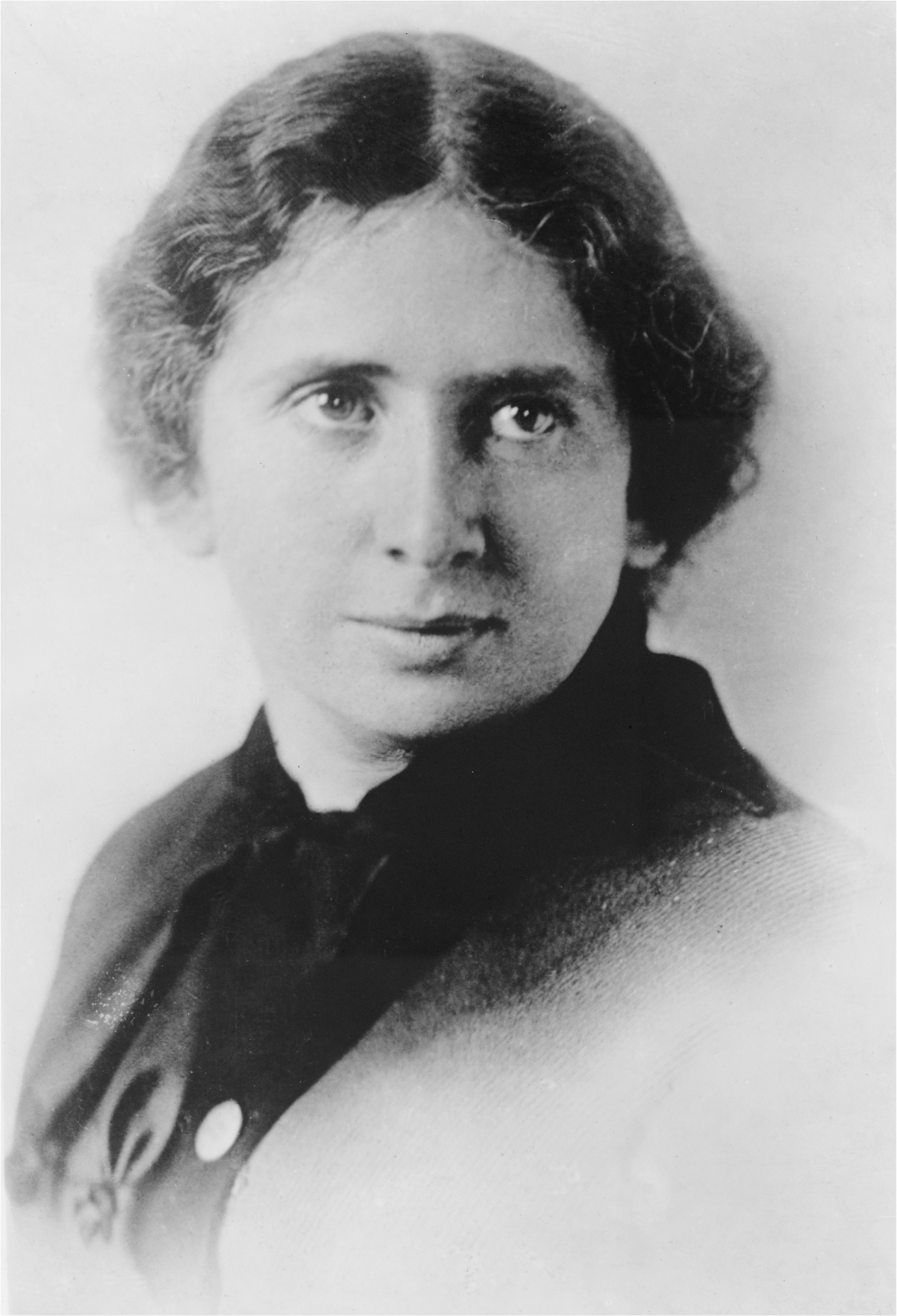
- Schneiderman c. 1910s
- Born: April 6, 1882; Sawin, Congress Poland, Russian Empire
- Died: August 11, 1972 (aged 90); New York City, New York, U.S.
- Occupation: Labor union leader
- Partner: Maud O'Farrell Swartz (d. 1937)

Rose Schneiderman (April 6, 1882 – August 11, 1972) was a Polish-born American labor organizer, feminist, and one of the most prominent female labor union leaders. As a member of the New York Women's Trade Union League, she drew attention to unsafe workplace conditions, following the Triangle Shirtwaist Factory fire of 1911, and as a suffragist she helped to pass the New York state referendum of 1917 that gave women the right to vote. Schneiderman was also a founding member of the American Civil Liberties Union and served on the National Recovery Administration's Labor Advisory Board under President Franklin D. Roosevelt. She is credited with popularizing the phrase "Bread and Roses," to indicate a worker's right to something higher than subsistence living.

== Early years ==
Rose Schneiderman was born Rachel Rose Schneiderman on April 6, 1882, (Note: Listed as 1884 or 1886 in some sources.) the first of four children of a religious Jewish family, in the village of Sawin, 14 kilometers (9 miles) north of Chełm in Russian Poland. Her parents, Samuel and Deborah (Rothman) Schneiderman, worked in the sewing trades. Schneiderman first went to Hebrew school, normally reserved for boys, in Sawin, and then to a Russian public school in Chełm. In 1890 the family migrated to Manhattan's Lower East Side. Schneiderman's father died in the winter of 1892, leaving the family in poverty. Her mother worked as a seamstress, trying to keep the family together, but the financial strain forced her to put her children in a Jewish orphanage for some time. Schneiderman left school in 1895 after the sixth grade, although she would have liked to have continued her education. She went to work, starting as a cashier in a department store and then in 1898 as a lining stitcher in a cap factory on the Lower East Side. In 1902 Schneiderman and the rest of her family moved briefly to Montreal, where she developed an interest in both radical politics and trade unionism. Her brother was communal worker, writer, and editor Harry Schneiderman.

The main theme of many of Schneiderman's most impactful speeches was that it would not make that big of a difference if a woman got the vote; however, women needed to vote to be able to get protection through the laws. She knew that a woman physically being in office would not make a huge difference and chose to not hide that fact. Instead, Schneiderman presented the idea of women voting to change laws instead of making laws in the first place. This idea helped her gain traction and the number of people who supported her boomed. This gave Schneiderman motivation and proved that she was doing something right.

== Career ==
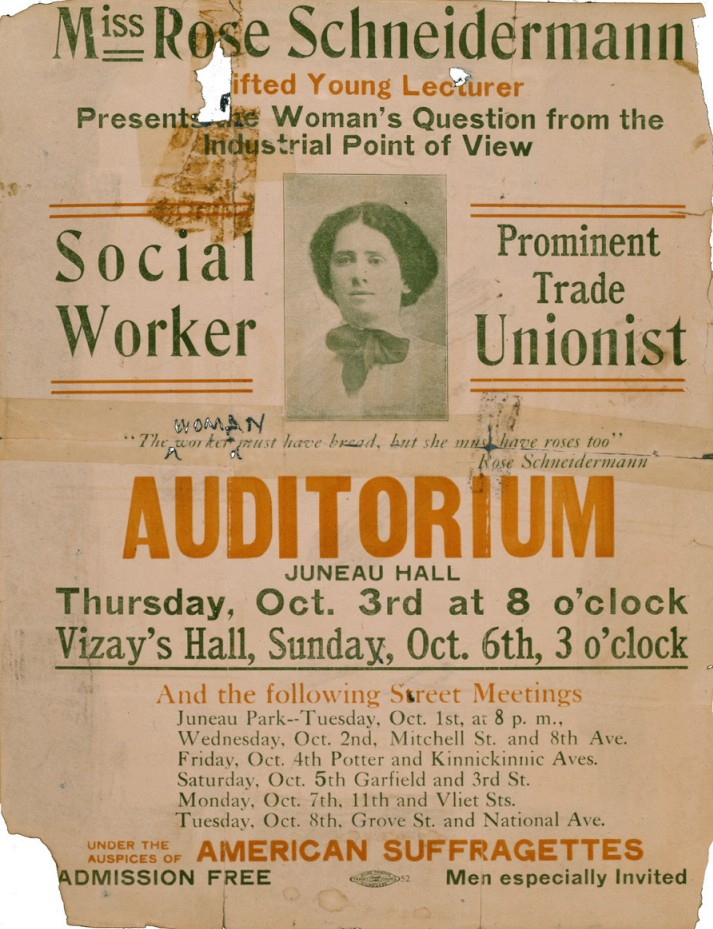
1912 poster for a Rose Schneiderman event in Milwaukee

Schneiderman returned to New York in 1903, and with a partner worker started organizing and coordinating with the women in her clothing factory. When they applied for a charter to the United Cloth Hat and Cap Makers Union, the union told them to return after they had succeeded in organizing twenty-five women. The women already knew they wanted to join, so they got to work recruiting others. They did that within days, and the union then chartered its first women's local.

The first strike of that union that Schneiderman participated in centered on a factory in Bayonne, New Jersey run by employers who had left Manhattan in an effort to avoid unionization. During this strike she gave a speech to workers that went over very well and contributed to her being elected a member of the United Cloth Hat and Cap Makers Union's general executive board. At just twenty-two, Schneiderman became the first woman to hold a position at that level in the trade union movement.

Schneiderman obtained wider recognition during a citywide capmakers' strike in 1905. Elected secretary of her local and a delegate to the New York City Central Labor Union, she came into contact with the New York Women's Trade Union League (WTUL), an organization that lent moral and financial support to the organizing efforts of women workers. She quickly became one of the most prominent members and was elected the New York branch's vice president in 1908. Schneiderman left the factory to work for the league, attending school with a stipend provided by one of the League's wealthy supporters. She was an active participant in the Uprising of the 20,000, the massive strike of shirtwaist workers in New York City led by the International Ladies' Garment Workers' Union in 1909. She also was a key member of the first International Congress of Working Women of 1919, which aimed to address women's working conditions at the first annual International Labour Organization Convention.

Schneiderman was born into a Jewish family. Her mother was very religious, but Schneiderman felt that the role of women within the religion was too restricting. She spent her life breaking gender expectations for women of Jewish background in the 1900s. Though Judaism was not a major part of her activist career, Schneiderman still did many things to help the Jewish community. Through her speeches and acts she managed to bring better economic standing and safety to the people of her community. In the 1930s and ‘40s Schneiderman helped to rescue European Jews, and was commemorated by Albert Einstein for her work.

=== Triangle Shirtwaist Factory fire ===
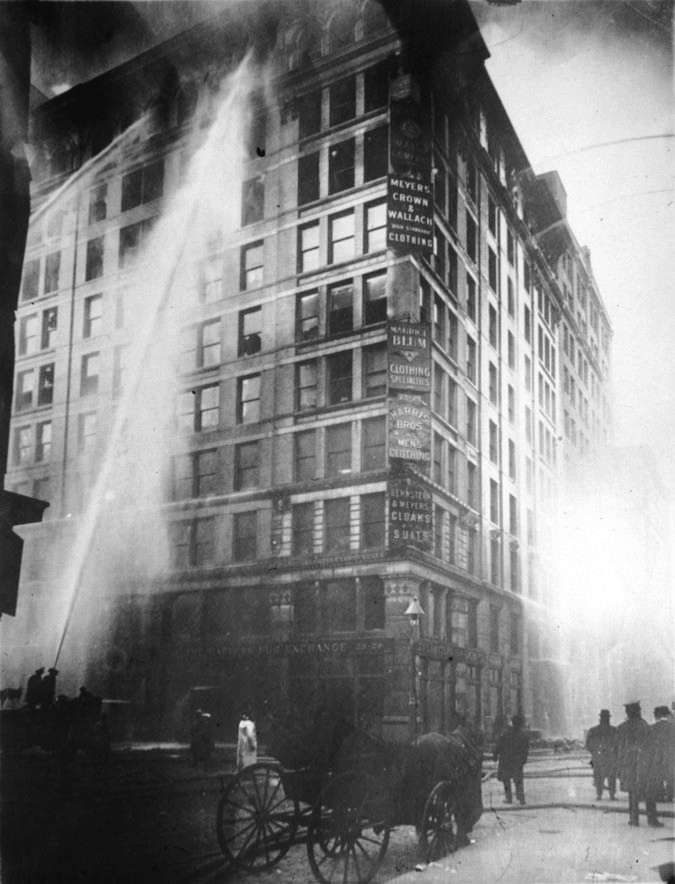
The Triangle Shirtwaist Factory on fire, March 25, 1911

The Triangle Shirtwaist Factory fire in 1911, in which 146 garment workers were burned alive or died jumping from the ninth floor of a factory building, dramatized the conditions that Schneiderman, the WTUL, and the union movement were fighting. The WTUL had documented similar unsafe conditions–factories without fire escapes or that had locked the exit doors to keep workers from stealing materials–at dozens of sweatshops in New York City and surrounding communities; twenty-five workers had died in a similar sweatshop fire in Newark, New Jersey, shortly before the Triangle disaster. Schneiderman expressed her anger at the memorial meeting held in the Metropolitan Opera House on April 2, 1911, to an audience largely made up of the well-heeled members of the WTUL:

I would be a traitor to these poor burned bodies if I came here to talk good fellowship. We have tried you good people of the public and we have found you wanting. The old Inquisition had its rack and its thumbscrews and its instruments of torture with iron teeth. We know what these things are today; the iron teeth are our necessities, the thumbscrews are the high-powered and swift machinery close to which we must work, and the rack is here in the firetrap structures that will destroy us the minute they catch on fire.

This is not the first time girls have been burned alive in the city. Every week I must learn of the untimely death of one of my sister workers. Every year thousands of us are maimed. The life of men and women is so cheap and property is so sacred. There are so many of us for one job it matters little if 143 of us are burned to death.

We have tried you citizens; we are trying you now, and you have a couple of dollars for the sorrowing mothers and brothers and sisters by way of a charity gift. But every time the workers come out in the only way they know to protest against conditions which are unbearable the strong hand of the law is allowed to press down heavily upon us.

Public officials have only words of warning to us–warning that we must be intensely orderly and must be intensely peaceable, and they have the workhouse just back of all their warnings. The strong hand of the law beats us back, when we rise, into the conditions that make life unbearable.

I can't talk fellowship to you who are gathered here. Too much blood has been spilled. I know from my experience it is up to the working people to save themselves. The only way they can save themselves is by a strong working-class movement.

Despite her harsh words, Schneiderman continued working in the WTUL as an organizer, returning to it after a frustrating year on the staff of the male dominated International Ladies Garment Workers Union (ILGWU). She subsequently became president of the WTUL's New York branch, then its national president for more than twenty years until it disbanded in 1950.

=== Labor activism and politics ===
In 1920, Schneiderman ran for the United States Senate as the candidate of the New York State Labor Party, receiving 15,086 votes and finishing behind the Prohibitionist Ella A. Boole (159,623 votes) and the Socialist Jacob Panken (151,246). Her platform had called for the construction of nonprofit housing for workers, improved neighborhood schools, publicly owned power utilities and staple food markets, and state-funded health and unemployment insurance for all Americans.

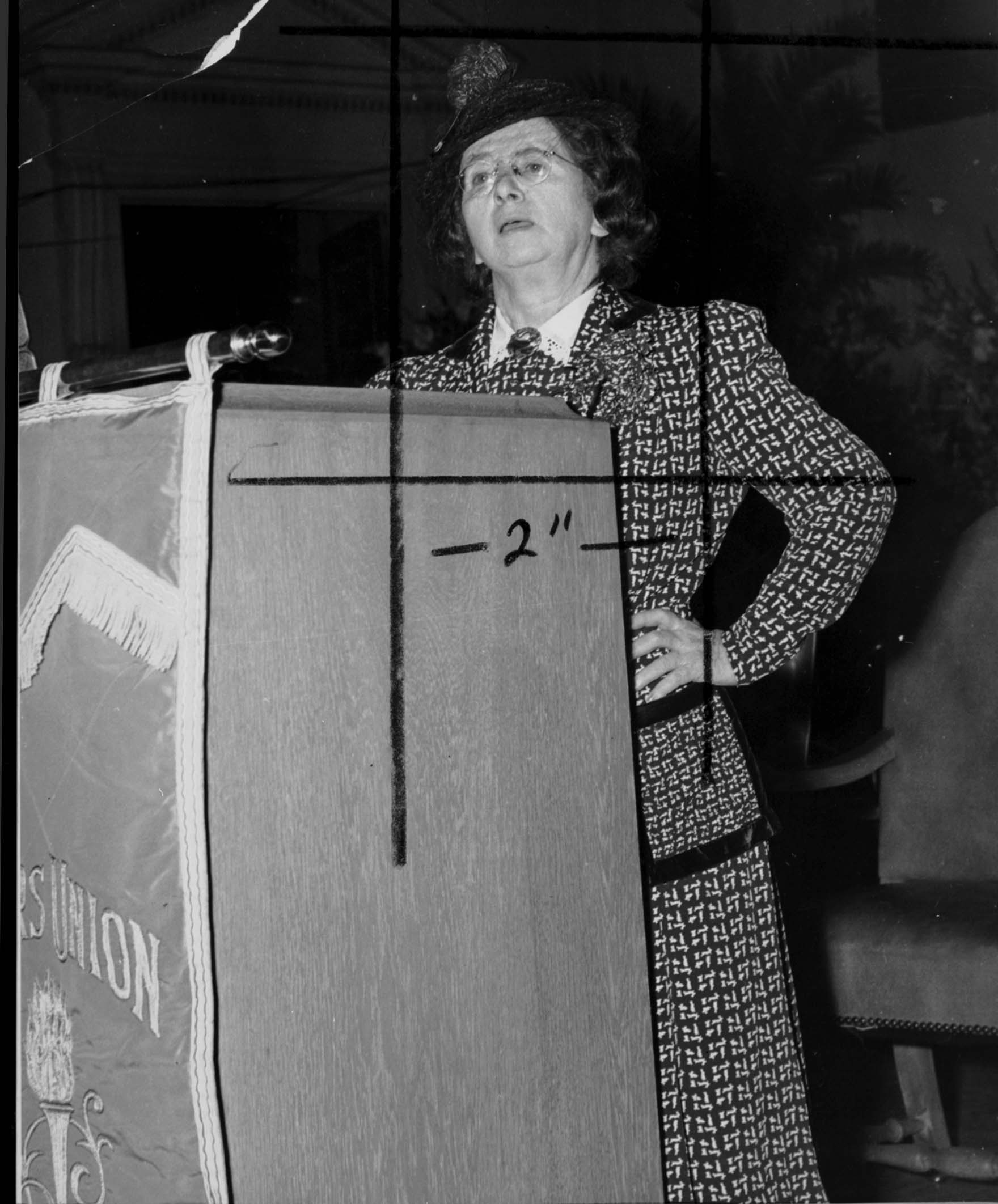
Schneiderman speaks at a labor event c. 1930s

Schneiderman was a founding member of the American Civil Liberties Union and became friends with Eleanor Roosevelt and her husband, Franklin D. Roosevelt. In 1926, she was elected president of the National WTUL, a post she retained until her retirement. In 1933, she was the only woman to be appointed on the National Recovery Administration's Labor Advisory Board by President Roosevelt and was a member of Roosevelt's "brain trust" during that decade. From 1937 to 1944 Schneiderman was secretary of labor for New York State and campaigned for the extension of social security to domestic workers and for equal pay for female workers. During the late 1930s and early 1940s, she was involved in efforts to rescue European Jews but could only rescue a small number. Albert Einstein wrote to her: "It must be a source of deep gratification to you to be making so important a contribution to rescuing our persecuted fellow Jews from their calamitous peril and leading them toward a better future."

=== Women's suffrage ===
Beginning in 1907, at the First Convention of Women Trade Unionists, Schneiderman argued that the political enfranchisement of women was necessary to address their poor working conditions. Accordingly, she helped expand the women's suffrage movement–which was then primarily associated with middle-class women–to include working-class women, especially factory workers, and to incorporate the issues they faced. She became a popular speaker with suffrage organizations that focused on working women, including Harriot Stanton Blatch's Equality League of Self-Supporting Women, and the American Suffragettes, a militant group based in New York City.

In 1912, on behalf of the National American Woman Suffrage Association (NAWSA), she traveled throughout Ohio's industrial cities, giving lectures to working men to garner support for a state suffrage referendum. To win men's support, she emphasized how beneficial the enfranchisement of working women would be for labor issues. As she later explained, "My argument to them was that if their wives and daughters were enfranchised, labor would be able to influence legislation enormously." While Schneiderman was hailed as a powerful speaker, the 1912 referendum did not pass, and it would not be until 1923–after the passage of the federal Nineteenth Amendment that granted women the right to vote-that the phrase "white male," in reference to voting, would be removed from the Constitution of Ohio.

In 1917, the same year that New York would vote on a women's suffrage referendum, Schneiderman was appointed head of the industrial section of the New York Women's Suffrage Association. In this capacity, she spoke at men's union meetings (though many employers had attempted to ban men from speaking to activists), distributed literature, and instituted a series of open letters that explained how suffrage could help women improve their own working conditions. On the day of the election, Schneiderman and several friends staffed three election districts–the first time, she later wrote, that they had seen the inside of a polling station. The referendum passed, granting New York's women full enfranchisement.

After the passage of the Nineteenth Amendment in 1920, feminists regrouped and, under the leadership of the National Woman's Party, pursued passage of the Equal Rights Amendment (ERA) to the United States Constitution, which proposed equal rights for all citizens, regardless of sex. Like other female labor activists, however, Schneiderman opposed the ERA, fearing it would deprive working women of the special statutory protections for which the WTUL had fought so hard, including the regulation of wages and hours, and protection against termination and dangerous working conditions during pregnancy.

== Legacy ==
Schneiderman is credited with coining one of the most memorable phrases of the women's movement and the labor movement of her era:

What the woman who labors wants is the right to live, not simply exist — the right to life as the rich woman has the right to life, and the sun and music and art. You have nothing that the humblest worker has not a right to have also. The worker must have bread, but she must have roses, too. Help, you women of privilege, give her the ballot to fight with.

Her phrase "Bread and Roses," became associated with a 1912 textile strike of largely immigrant, largely women workers in Lawrence, Massachusetts. It was later used as the title of a song by James Oppenheim and was set to music by Mimi Fariña and sung by various artists, among them Judy Collins and John Denver.

In 1949, Schneiderman retired from public life, making occasional radio speeches and appearances for various labor unions, devoting her time to writing her memoirs, which she published under the title All for One, in 1967.

Schneiderman never married and treated her nieces and nephews as if they were her own children. She had a long-term relationship with Maud O'Farrell Swartz (1879–1937), another working-class woman active in the WTUL, until Swartz's death in 1937. It is unknown whether this relationship was romantic or not, but Swartz and Schneiderman were indeed work and travel partners and were invited to events together and gave gifts together. According to historian Annelise Orleck, "Schneiderman gives no more specific description of her feelings for Swartz than to say that 'she was a wonderful companion.' Euphemistic or not, that probably provides an emotionally accurate sense of their relationship."

Rose Schneiderman died in New York City on August 11, 1972, at age ninety. In an obituary appearing in The New York Times, she was credited with teaching Eleanor and Franklin D. Roosevelt "most of what they knew about unions," and having an indirect influence on the passage of the National Labor Relations Act of 1935 (also known as the Wagner Act), the National Industrial Recovery Act, and other New Deal legislation. The obituary also declared that she had done "more to upgrade the dignity and living standards of working women than any other American."

=== Maine mural controversy ===
In March 2011, almost 100 years to the day after the Triangle Shirtwaist Factory fire, Maine's Republican governor Paul LePage, who was inaugurated in January of the same year, had a three-year-old 36 foot-wide mural with scenes of Maine workers on the Department of Labor's building in Augusta removed and brought to a secret location. The mural has 11 panels, and has also a picture showing Rose Schneiderman, although she had never lived or worked in Maine. Schneiderman is featured in the panel titles "Labor Reformers" and can be seen in the background of this mural panel. According to The New York Times, "LePage has also ordered that the Labor Department's seven conference rooms be renamed. One is named after César Chávez, the farmworkers' leader; one after Rose Schneiderman, a leader of the New York Women's Trade Union League a century ago; and one after Frances Perkins, who became the nation's first female labor secretary and is buried in Maine."

On April 1, 2011, it was disclosed that a federal lawsuit had been filed in US district court seeking "to confirm the mural's current location, insure that the artwork is adequately preserved, and ultimately to restore it to the Department of Labor's lobby in Augusta". On March 23, 2012, US District Judge John A. Woodcock ruled that the removal of the mural was a protected form of government speech and that LePage removing it would be no different from his refusing to read aloud a history of labor in Maine. A month later, supporters of the mural filed a notice of appeal in the First Circuit Court of Appeals in Boston. The court rejected the appeal on November 28, 2012. On January 13, 2013, it was announced that the mural had been placed in the Maine State Museum's atrium per an agreement between the Museum and the Department of Labor, and that it would be available for public viewing the next day.
