= 1904 New York City rent strike =

First mass rent strike in New York City

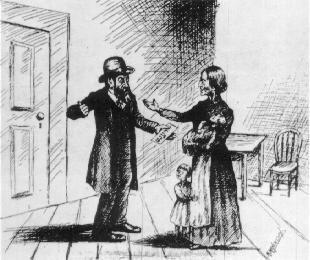
- Political cartoon published by The Daily Forward during the 1904 NYC Rent Strike
- Date: Spring 1904
- Location: Lower East Side
- Caused by: Rent increases and housing shortage
- Goals: Halt on rent increases
- Result: Rent reductions for approximately 2,000 people

Parties
| Tenants, Socialist Party of America | Police, Landlords, Magistrates |

Number
| ~2,000 people | |

The first mass rent strike in New York City took place on the Lower East Side in the spring of 1904, spreading to 2,000 families across 800 tenements and lasting nearly a month. The strike was a response to proposed rent increases amid a housing shortage. It was primarily organized by local Jewish immigrant women with organizational strategies and language learned from the 1902 kosher meat boycott and the history of labor organizing in the area. Tenant organizers, socialists, and local labor unions united as the New York Protective Rent Association; women who had initially organized the strike such as Bertha Liebson were removed from leadership positions. The strike was successful in the short term, halting the majority of proposed rent increases for the following year. However, landlords began raising rents again a year later, leading to the 1907 New York City Rent Strike.

== Context ==
For approximately 50 years before 1904, the poor conditions in tenement slums were well-known. Legislators sought to remedy the situation through legislation without tenants' input.

In 1900, the Lower East Side was reportedly one of the densest known places on earth, with over 700 people per acre. Most buildings were crowded multifamily tenements that were shabbily built, were fire traps and often lacked proper sanitation services.

The passage of the New York State Tenement House Act in 1901, immigration, and the demolition of old tenements, decreased the available housing. The construction of the Williamsburg Bridge beginning in 1900 displaced 17,000 residents.

Each year on May 1 landlords would announce rent increases across the board. The day became known as Moving Day due to the increases. Landlords proposed an increase of 20–30% for May 1, 1904. By spring, The New York Times reported municipal courts had approximately 800 eviction cases awaiting processing.

In 1902, housewives on the Lower East Side organized a community boycott of kosher butchers in response to a price increase. This developed the organizing skills for the 1904 rent strike. By 1904, increasing rents saw isolated rent strikes.

== 1904 rent strike ==
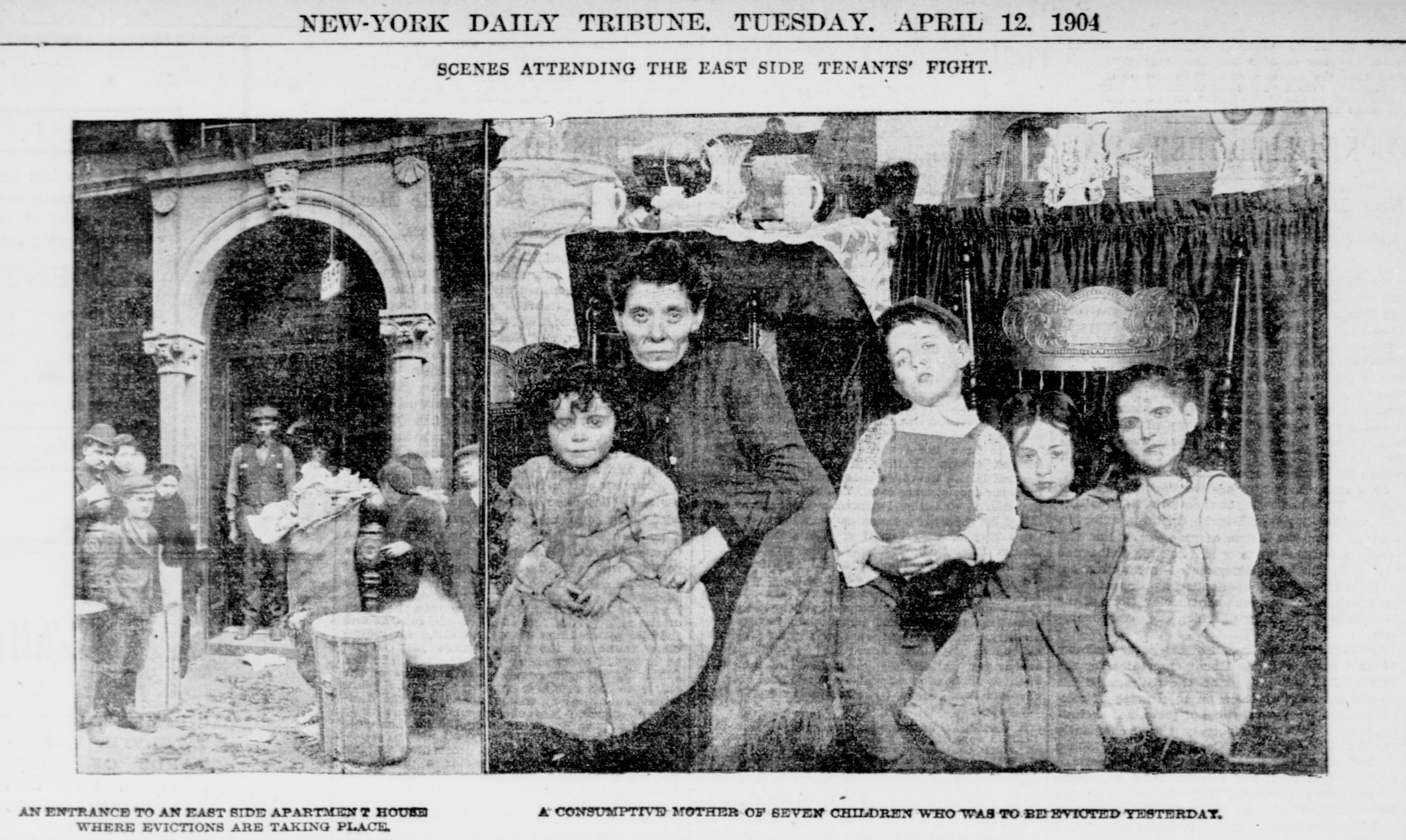
"Scenes Attending the East Side Tenants' Fight" - The New-York Tribune, April 12, 1904. A photograph of people standing outside a tenement during an eviction and a photograph of a mother and family who were nearly evicted during the strike.

The rent strike of 1904 was the first mass rent strike in New York City's history and lasted nearly a month. It was initially organized informally among Jewish immigrant women on the Lower East Side, who canvassed the neighborhood for support and organized strategy meetings, pickets, and tenants unions. It grew to include 800 tenement houses and 2,000 families.

The strike relied on organizing tactics learned from the kosher boycott and contemporary papers such as The Daily Forward explicitly drew connections between the two events. Striking residents organized picket lines, protests, marches, and hung signs in Yiddish and English asking people not to rent from landlords whose tenants were on strike. The strike also borrowed the language of labor organizing in the heavily socialist Lower East Side: the tenants referred to themselves as strikers, the withholding of rent as a rent strike, tenant associations as tenant unions, and tenants who crossed the picket line as scabs.

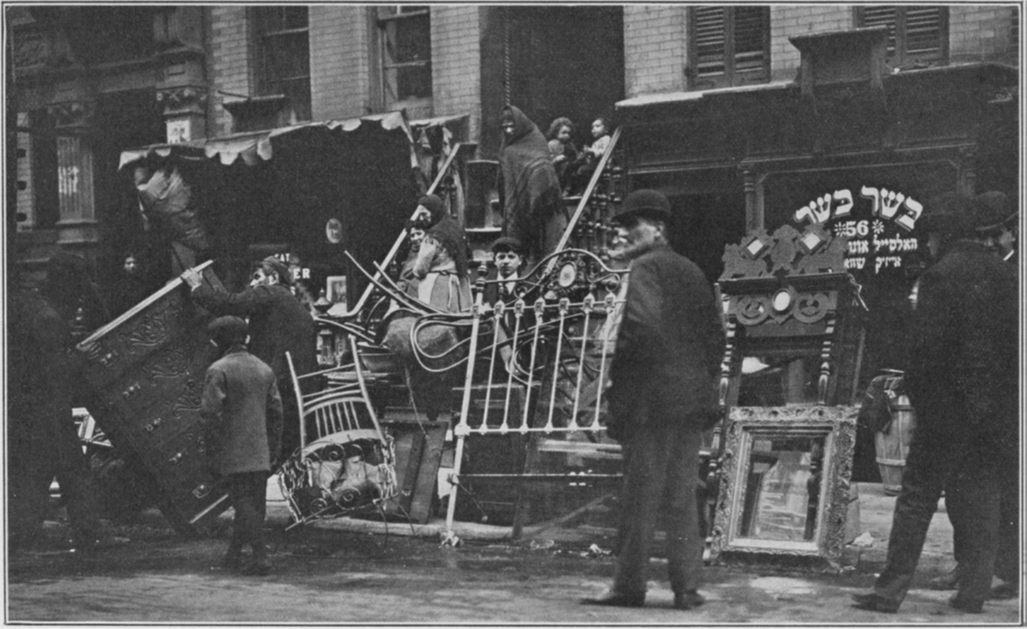
"An East Side Eviction" New Era Illustrated Magazine. May 1904

The United Hebrew Trades, the Workmen's circle, and other local unions formed the New York Protective Rent Association (NYPRA), modeled on landsmanshaft, Jewish fraternal and mutual aid societies, in early April 1904. The Socialist Party of America supported the strike and participated in the NYPRA. The assembly elected socialist Sam Katz as temporary chairman and Bertha Liebson, then 17 years old, as treasurer due to her canvassing of the Lower East Side for financial support for the strike. The organization collected dues from members and gave small sums to evicted tenants and provided legal counsel.

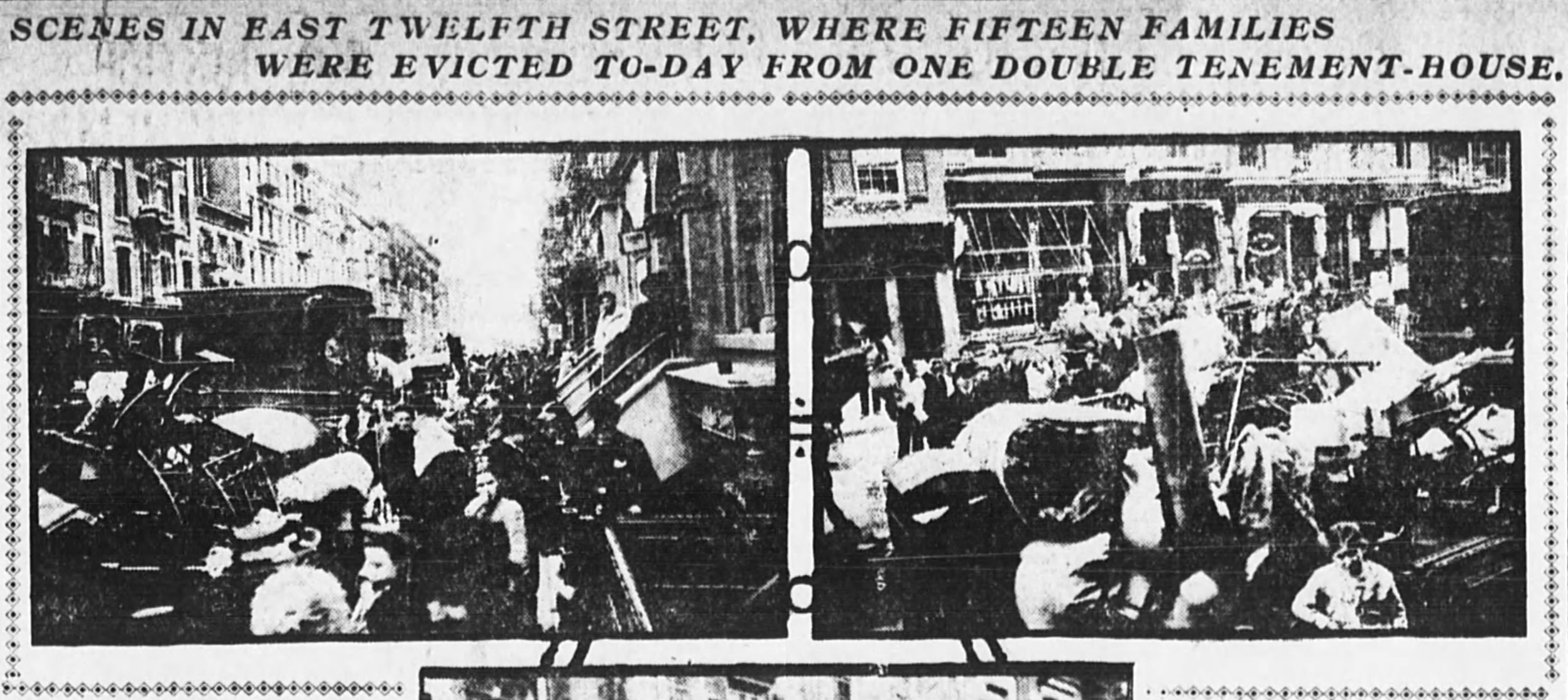
Fifteen Families Evicted, April 26, 1904

Liebson and organizers targeted "lessees", agents of absentee tenement landlords who secured long-term leases and let out individual apartments, saving funds to purchase tenements outright. They were also known as "cockroach landlords" and "listers"; tenants' bitterness was exacerbated by the fact the listers were frequently fellow Jews. The lead organizers planned to overwhelm the municipal courts with eviction cases and force them to dismiss them en masse. According to the New-York Tribune, tenants took "advantage of every technicality, delay and dispossess obstruction that the law permits". Many tenants also began resorting to attacking landlords and rioting, to the extent that at a point conflicts with the police were a daily occurrence.

The NYPRA contained approximately 1,000 members but fell under internal divisions between being explicitly socialist or focused on the single issue of tenancy. Liebson and others advocated for focusing on tenancy and resisted the shift but were driven from leadership. Liebson was removed as treasurer on the basis women were unfit for the position; by mid-April, the tenant leadership had no women.

The Mayor, Chief of Police, and other city officials began to turn against the strikers. Many courts began to process more eviction cases to pressure the strikers, additionally singling out tenant leaders such as Leibson.

== Aftermath and legacy ==
A socialist faction of the NYRPRA seceded and the NYPRA dissolved soon after.

Though the strike failed to establish a sustained institutional base for future tenant organizing, it was largely successful as newspapers reported the overwhelming majority of landlords rolled rents back to pre-strike levels and even offered tenants leases. The strike empowered tenants for future organizing. A year after it ended, landlords began to raise rents again, which would soon lead to the 1907 New York City Rent Strike.

== See also ==
- Anti-Rent War
- 1918-20 New York City rent strikes
- Tenants' strike of 1907
- Old Law Tenement
- New Law Tenement
