= Scarano =

Scarano is a surname. Notable people with the surname include:

- Greta Scarano (born 1986), Italian television, stage and film actress
- Oronzo Mario Scarano (1847–1901), Italian composer and conductor
- Robert Scarano Jr. (born 1959), American architect
- Tecla Scarano (1894-1978), Italian actress and singer
- Vicencio Scarano Spisso (born 1963), Venezuelan politician and entrepreneur
