= Lower East Side Tenement Museum =

Museum in Manhattan, New York

- The Tenement Museum; Tenement buildings at 97 & 103 Orchard St.
- U.S. National Register of Historic Places
- U.S. National Historic Landmark
- U.S. National Historic Site
- U.S. Historic district – Contributing property
- New York State Register of Historic Places
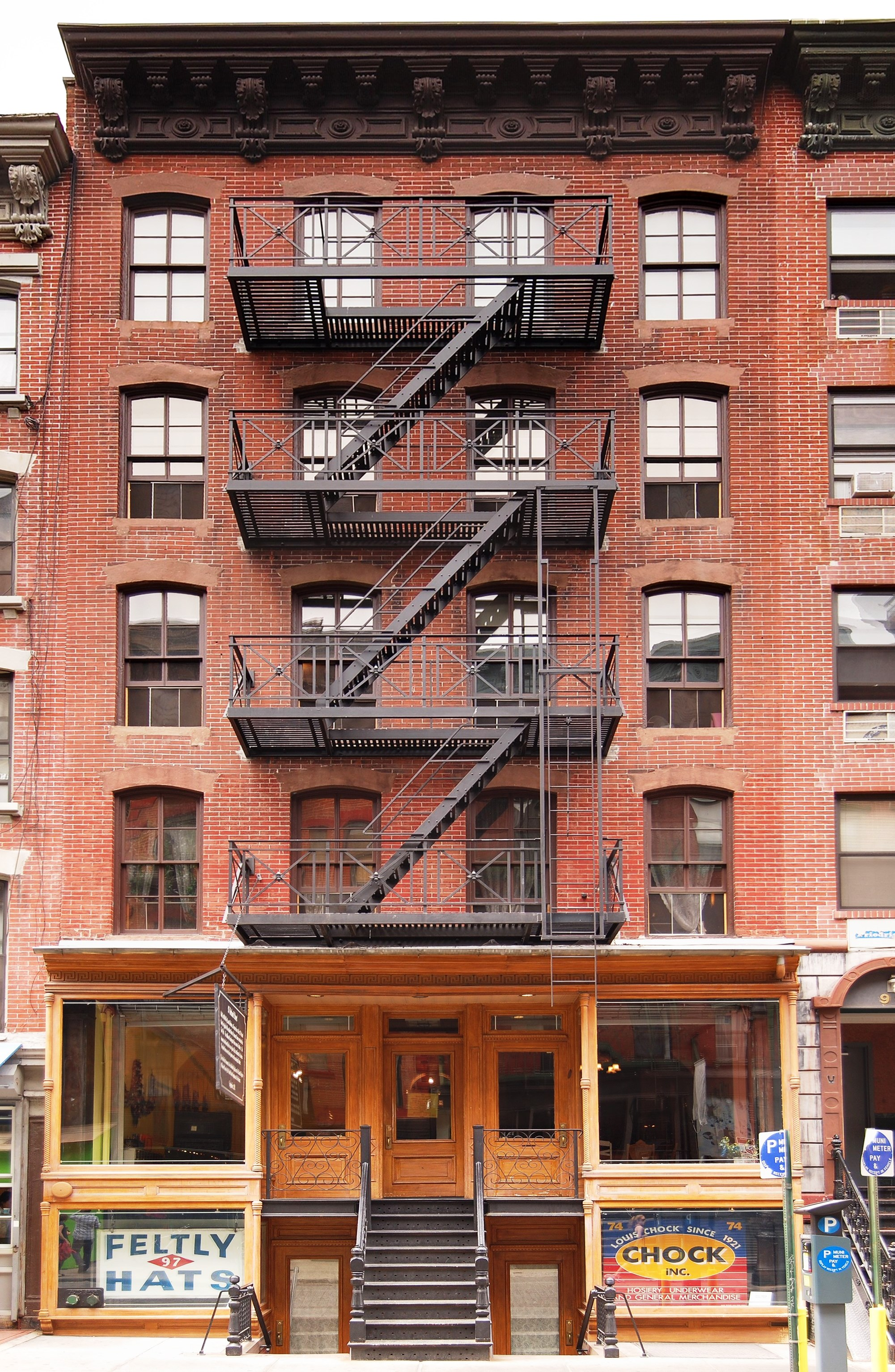
- (2010)

- Location within Lower Manhattan Location within New York City Location within New York Location within the United States
- Location: 97 Orchard Street, Manhattan, New York 10002
- Coordinates: 40°43′06.6″N 73°59′24.5″W
- Area: 0.0925 acres (4,030 ft^{2}; 374 m^{2})
- Built: 1863
- Architectural style: Italianate
- Website: www.tenement.org
- Part of: Lower East Side Historic District (ID00001015)
- NRHP reference No.: 92000556
- NYSRHP No.: 06101.001748

Significant dates
- Added to NRHP: May 19, 1992
- Designated NHL: April 19, 1994
- Designated NHS: November 12, 1998
- Designated NYSRHP: March 26, 1992

The Lower East Side Tenement Museum is a museum and National Historic Site located at 97 and 103 Orchard Street on the Lower East Side of Manhattan in New York City, United States. The museum's two historical tenement buildings were home to an estimated 15,000 people, from over 20 nations, between 1863 and 1935 (97 Orchard Street) and 1888 and 2015 (103 Orchard Street). The museum, which includes a visitors' center, promotes tolerance and historical perspective on the immigrant experience.

== History ==
The building at 97 Orchard Street was contracted by Prussian-born immigrant Lukas Glockner in 1863 and was modified several times to conform with the New York State Tenement House Act. When first constructed, it contained 22 apartments and a basement level saloon. Over time, four stoop-level and two basement apartments were converted into commercial retail space, leaving 16 apartments in the building. Modifications over the years included the installation of indoor plumbing (cold running water, two toilets per floor), an air shaft, and gas followed by electricity. In 1935, rather than continuing to modify the building, the landlord evicted the residents, boarded the upper windows, and sealed the upper floors, leaving only the stoop-level and basement storefronts open for business. No further changes were made until the Lower East Side Tenement Museum became involved with the building in 1988. As such, the building stands as a kind of time capsule, reflecting 19th and early 20th century living conditions and the changing notions of what constitutes acceptable housing. Thanks to extensive restoration over many years (overseen in phases by Perkins Eastman and Li/Saltzman Architects) visitors can explore two different buildings—97 and 103 Orchard Street—and view recreated apartments that represent eras across the nineteenth and twentieth centuries.

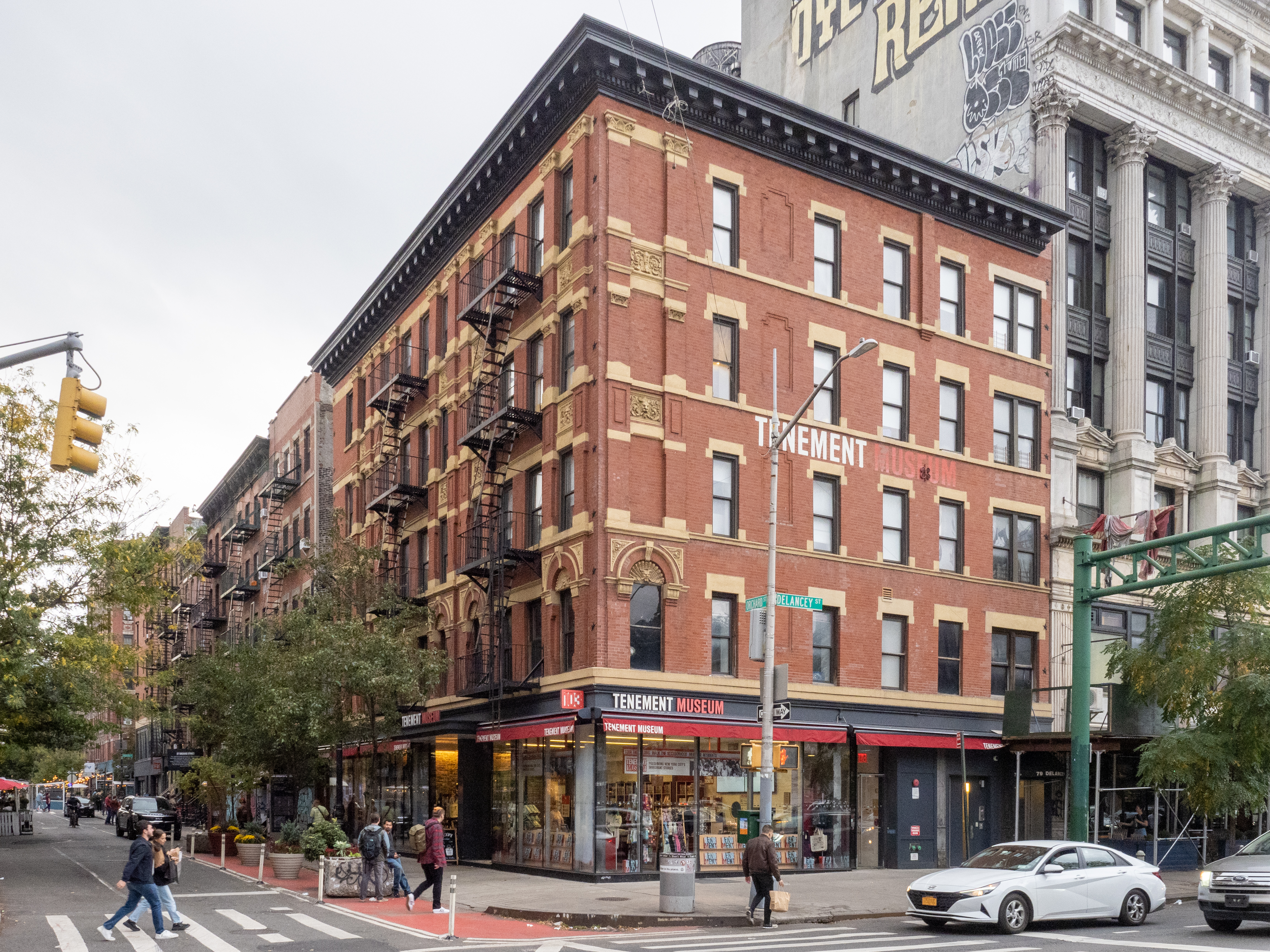
The Tenement Museum

The Tenement Museum was founded in 1988 by Ruth J. Abram and Anita Jacobson. The museum's first key property, the tenement at 97 Orchard Street, was designated a National Historic Landmark on April 19, 1994. The National Historic Site was authorized on November 12, 1998. It is an affiliated area of the National Park Service but is owned and administered by the Lower East Side Tenement Museum. The site received a Save America's Treasures matching grant for $250,000 in 2000 for preservation work. In 2001 the museum was awarded the Rudy Bruner Award for Urban Excellence silver medal. In 2005, the museum was among 406 New York City arts and social service institutions to receive part of a $20 million grant from the Carnegie Corporation, which was made possible through a donation by New York City mayor Michael Bloomberg. The National Defense Authorization Act for the 2015 fiscal year expanded the National Historic Site designation to also include the tenement at 103 Orchard Street.

The Tenement Museum attracted some negative press in 2007 related to its employees seeking union membership as well as for its planned acquisition of the building at 99 Orchard Street through eminent domain in 2002.

The current president of the museum is Dr. Annie Polland, who took over the role from Dr. Morris Vogel in 2021.

== Exhibits, collections, and programs ==
The museum's exhibits and programs include restored period room apartments and shops open daily for public tours, depicting the lives of immigrants who lived at 97 Orchard Street between 1869 and 1935 and 103 Orchard Street from the 1950s to the 1980s. The museum also provides a documentary film and offers tours with costumed interpreters for portraying the building's former residents, tastings of their communities' typical foods, and neighborhood walks. The museum's tours place the immigrants' lives in the broader context of American history. The museum also has an extensive collection of historical archives and provides a variety of educational programs.

An exhibition titled "Under One Roof" opened in December 2017. Located at 103 Orchard Street, above the Visitor Center, the exhibition explores the lives of a Holocaust refugee family, a Puerto Rican migrant family, and a Chinese immigrant family.

In the spring of 2021, the Tenement Museum added "Reclaiming Black Spaces" to their list of available walking and virtual tours, educating visitors on Black experiences on the Lower East Side. This was inspired by a discovery in the museum's collection regarding two men named Joseph Moore. These men were both residents of NYC, were about the same age, and worked in the same profession. Their biggest difference was one was a white Irishman and lived in the museum's location at 97 Orchard Street, and the other was a Black man who lived in a nearby tenement house. The museum has recreated the kitchen of the Irish Joseph Moore, and they plan to open an apartment recreating the home of Joseph Moore and his family in 2022. This will be the first permanent apartment exhibit by the museum representing the Black experience.

== Buildings ==
The buildings comprising the Tenement Museum were influenced by the New York State Tenement House Acts of 1867, 1879, and 1901. The building at 97 Orchard Street was built prior to the passage of the 1867 act, which required at least one toilet for every 20 tenants, a connection to the city's sewage system, and a fire escape. As such, 97 Orchard was split into 20 apartments, each with three rooms; there was originally no running water, sewage system, or garbage disposal system. The rear units did not have any natural light or access to air, as was required of tenements built under the 1879 act. To comply with the 1901 act (which required buildings to include running water, gas, light, and ventilation), some of the partition walls were retrofitted with windows, and toilets and air shafts were built.

== In popular culture ==
Lower East Side Tenement Museum has been featured in several films, including Crossing Delancey (1988) and The Definition of Insanity (2004), where the museum was used as setting for the interior hospital sequences. It was spoofed in a 2017 Saturday Night Live skit in which Louis C. K. and Kate McKinnon played Polish immigrants telling ethnic jokes about Italians. The museum also made a brief appearance in the Netflix original series Dash & Lily (2020), where it is the exterior backdrop while Lily skips down the street at the beginning of episode 2, season 1.

== See also ==
- List of museums and cultural institutions in New York City
- Jane Ziegelman, the museum's culinary director and author of 97 Orchard
- Bialystoker Synagogue
- A Stoop on Orchard Street, a musical inspired by a visit to the museum
- Tenement House (Glasgow), a similar museum in Scotland
- List of National Historic Landmarks in New York City
- National Register of Historic Places listings in Manhattan below 14th Street
