= Veiller =

Veiller is a surname. Notable people with the surname include:

- Amelie Veiller Van Norman (1844–1920), French-born American educator
- Anthony Veiller (1903–1965), American screenwriter
- Bayard Veiller (1869–1943), American playwright
- Lawrence Veiller (1872–1959), American social reformer
