= 1907 New York City rent strike =

Housing protest in New York City

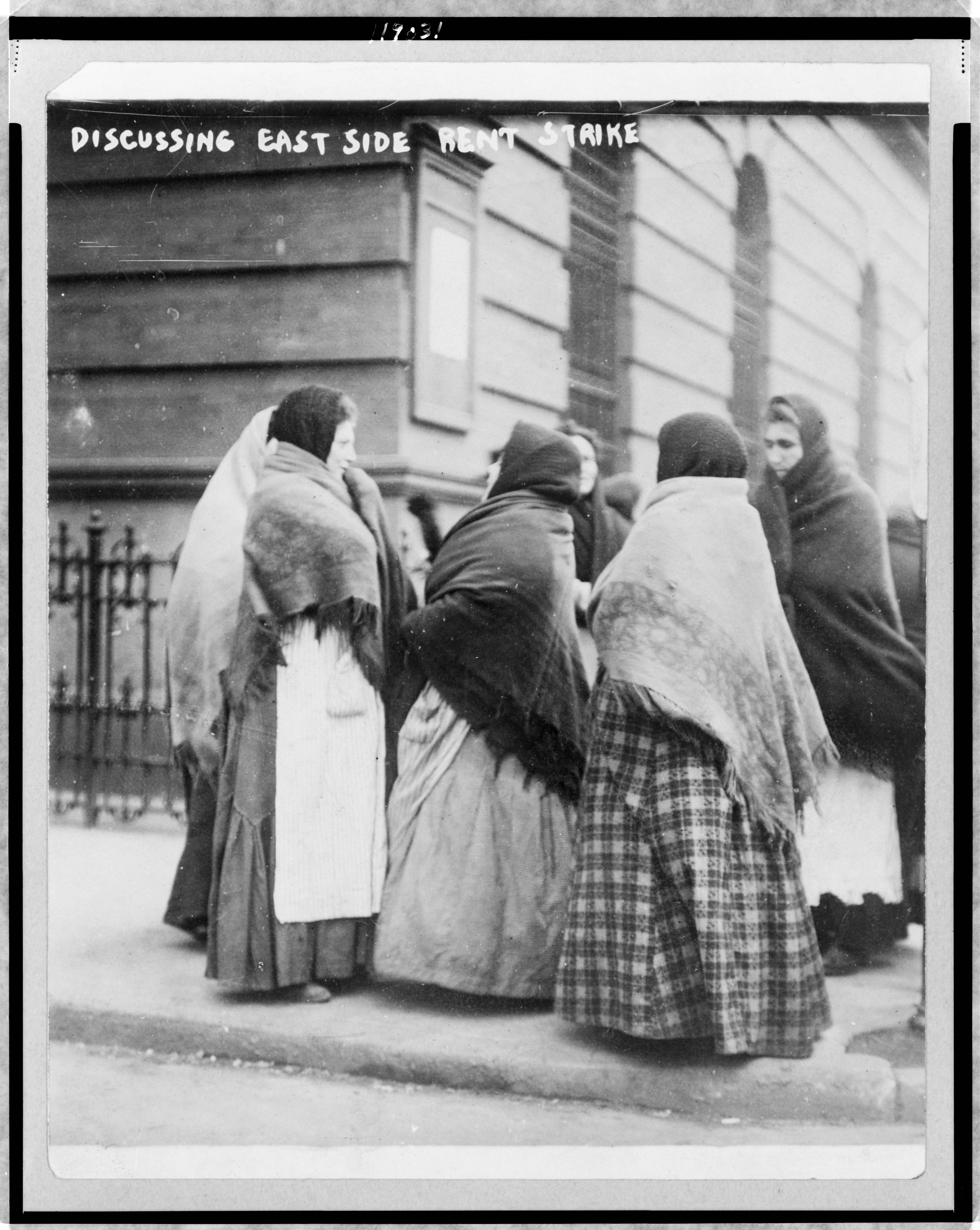
- Group discussing the East Side rent strike on a sidewalk
- Date: December 26, 1907 - January 9, 1908
- Location: New York City, primarily the Lower East Side but also Williamsburg, Brooklyn, the Upper East Side, and Upper West Side.
- Caused by: Rent increases and the Panic of 1907
- Goals: Rent reductions and a cap on rent based on wages
- Result: Rent reductions for approximately 2,000 people

Parties
Tenants, Socialist Party of America	Police, Landlords, Magistrates

Lead figures
Pauline Newman	

Number
~10,000 people	

The 1907 New York City rent strike or the East Side rent strike lasted from December 26, 1907, to January 9, 1908. The rent strike began in response to a proposed rent increase in the wake of the Panic of 1907 which saw tens of thousands unemployed. It began on the Lower East Side and the predominant organizers were Jewish immigrant women in the neighborhood such as Pauline Newman, who played a major role in organizing the strike. It eventually spread to other areas of Manhattan and Brooklyn, comprising approximately 10,000 tenants. The strike was taken over by the Eight Assembly District of the Socialist Party of America in early 1908. Due to mass evictions and police brutality, the strike was broken, though approximately 2,000 successfully halted rent increases.

== Context ==
In the early 1900s, rent in the area had increased due to an influx of immigrants, the demolition of existing tenements, and slower rate of new buildings due to the Tenement House Act of 1901. This all led to a speculative housing market. In 1904, landlords called for a general rent increase of 20-30% starting May 1. In response, tenants organized into tenants unions and started a mass rent strike on the Lower East Side, the first rent strike in New York City. The strike comprised 800 tenement houses wherein 2,000 tenants faced eviction. Organizing was initially informal, relying on networking among the Jewish community, and primarily relying on women. The first neighborhood organization, the New York Protective Rent Association, was formed by socialist leaders as an umbrella organization. It provided striking tenants with a lawyer to assist them by contesting cases on technical grounds to gain adjournments. Between 1902 and 1908, rents in the tenements increased by approximately 25%.

The Depression of 1907 led to 75-100 thousand men on the Lower East Side being unemployed. In December 1907, landlords announced rent would be increased by 1-2 dollars, the latest in a series of rent hikes over the past several years.

== 1907 rent strike ==
The rent strike began December 26, 1907, and lasted until January 9, 1908, primarily led by local housewives who canvassed the neighborhood tenements for support. Pauline Newman, then 16 years old and working in the Triangle Shirtwaist Factory, helped organize the strike and was labelled in city newspapers as "The New Joan of Arc. By December 26th she had organized about 400 working girls to canvass the neighborhood during the evenings. By December 28th, tenants made lists of the buildings code violations in the neighborhood and presented them to city officials, prompting attention from inspectors in the Tenement House Department and Health Department. Papers such as The Daily Forward urged rent strikes.

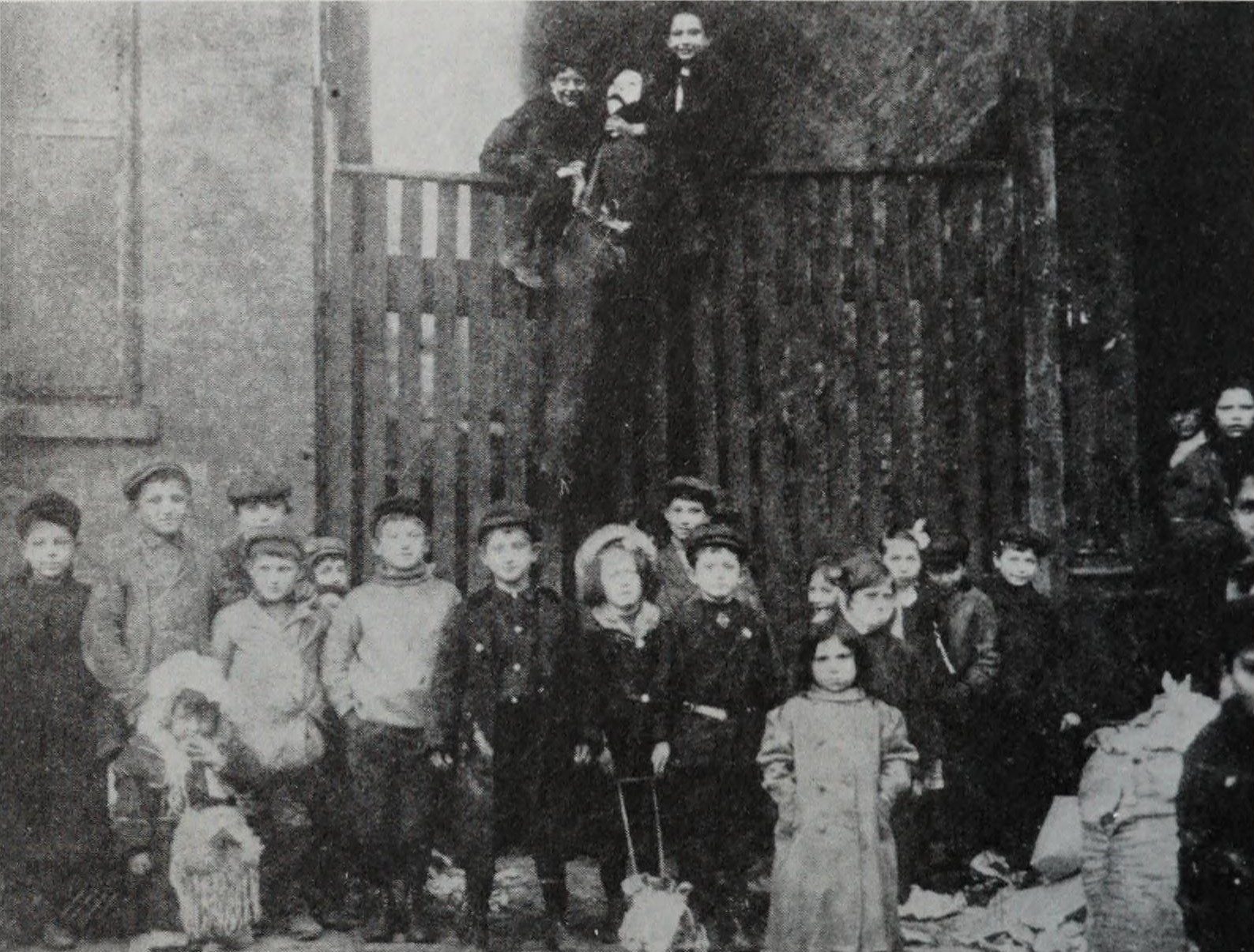
Tenement children on the Lower East Side hanging the effigy of a landlord during the strike

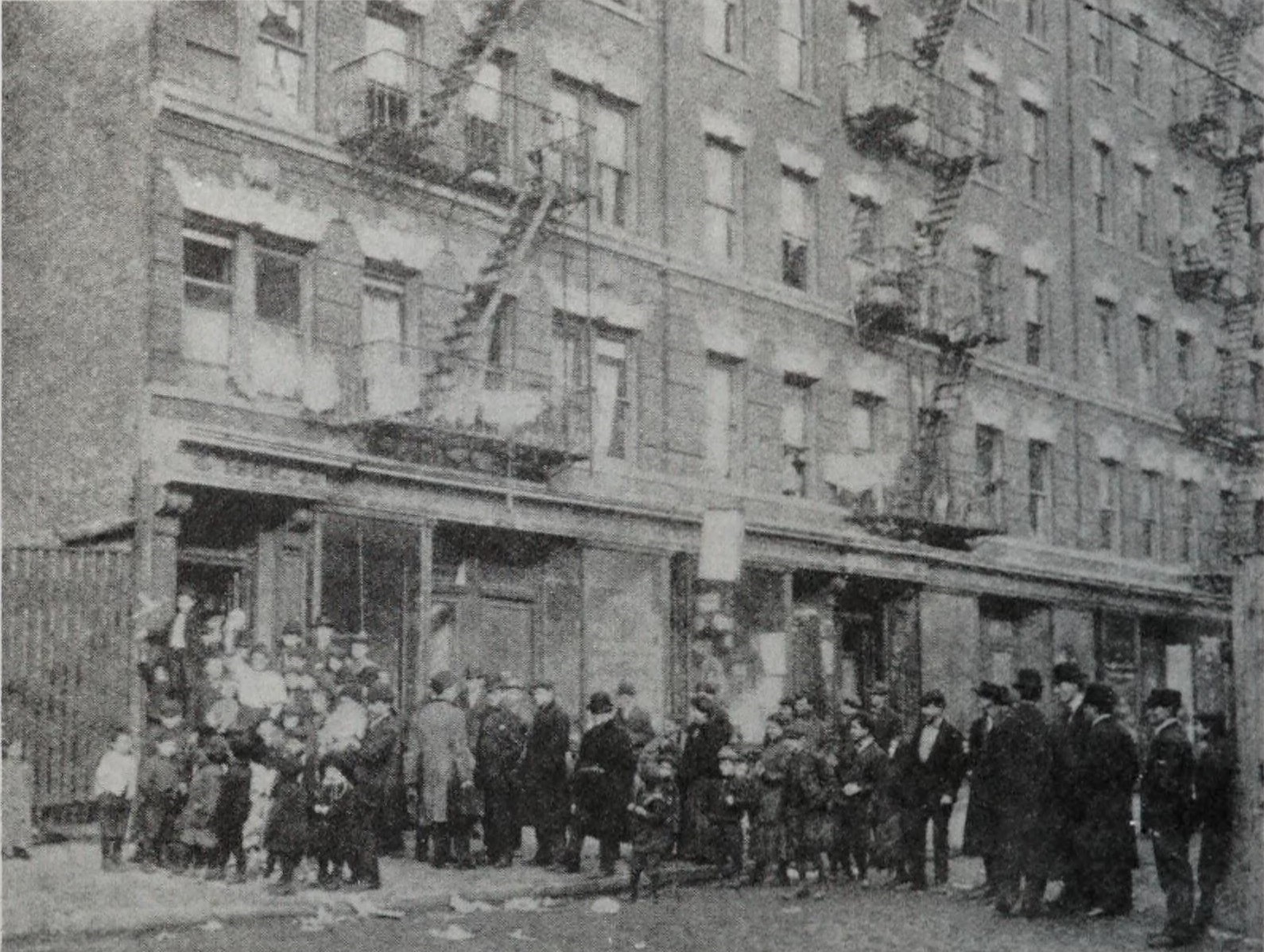
A tenant organizer on the left with her fist raised, addressing a group of tenants outside a Lower East Side building in December 1907

In 1908, the rent strike was brought under the Socialist Party of America's Eight Assembly District. While initial organizing had been done by women, the party was composed primarily of men. The Socialist Labor Party, the rival social democratic organization, was critical of the strike, taking issue with organizing workers as consumers. Under the party, the rent strike spread to Brooklyn and Harlem; tenants of Newark, New Jersey, also sent a delegation to discuss organizing their own strike. Sympathy strikes were organized in Williamsburg, Brooklyn, and Manhattans Upper East Side and Upper West Side. Tenants were organized in Italian as well as Jewish neighborhoods. Organized by the party, the tenants hung effigies of their landlords and hung red flags, often dyed petticoats, from their windows.

Due to the strike's association with the Socialist Party, it was considered a leftist activity by much of the New York City public. As a result, it became susceptible to waves of anti-communist sentiment. The media was less supportive of the strike than the one in 1904, calling it a "tenant uprising", "rent war", and "tenant rebellion". On January 5, 1908, under the direction of the landlords, police brutalized strikers after they had refused to disperse meetings and take down the red flags and protest signs hung up.

== Aftermath and legacy ==
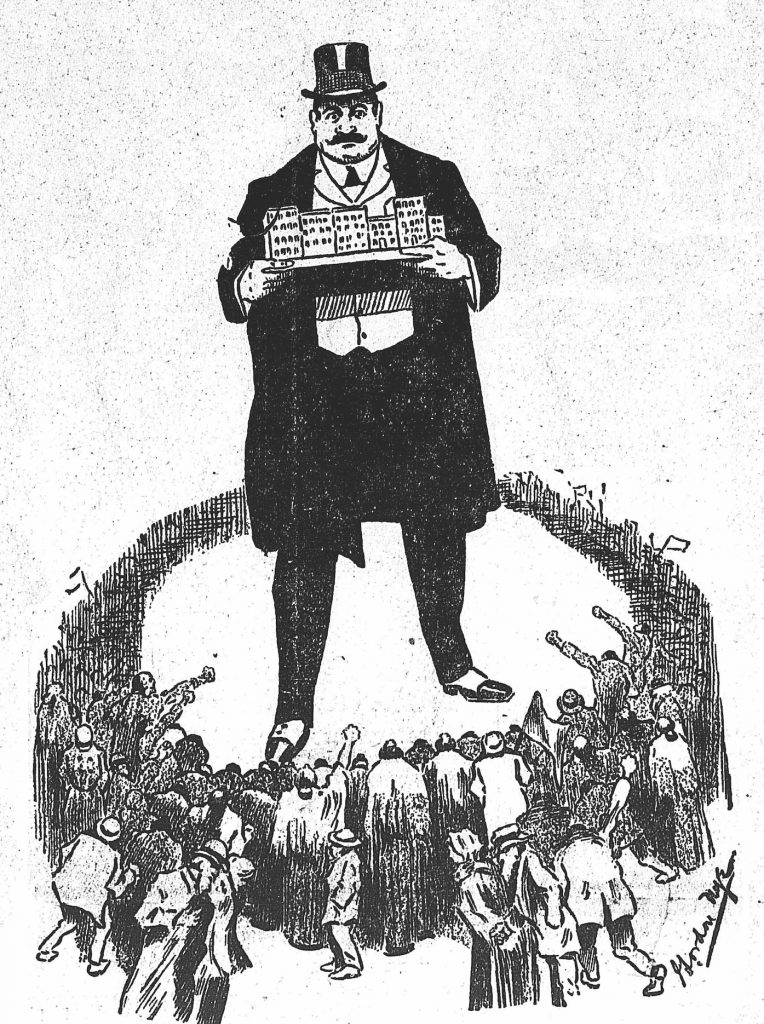
Political cartoon in Louis Miller's newspaper Di Varhayt - “How the landlord pictures himself in the great rent war.”

Magistrates issued thousands of eviction notices, effectively breaking the strike. Of the 10,000 participants, only about 2,000 received rent reductions. The demand to cap the rent at 30% of wages was unmet. The strike did not result in long-lasting organizations or changes to the Lower East Side.

On January 12, 1908, Yiddish poet Morris Rosenfeld published a one-act play titled Rent Strike in The Daily Forward.

Nothing comparable took place until after World War I. The strike drew the attention of women leaders in the settlement house movement, who would then introduce the concept of rent control into NYC politics. In 1917, a wave of rent strikes began which led to the institution of rent controls in 1920.

== See also ==
- Anti-Rent War
- Tenants' strike of 1907
- Old Law Tenement
- New Law Tenement
- New York shirtwaist strike of 1909
