= New York City Department of Buildings =

New York City government agency

Department of Buildings

Department overview
- Formed: 1892
- Preceding department: NYC Housing and Development Administration
- Jurisdiction: New York City
- Employees: 1,822 (FY 2026)
- Annual budget: $232.1 million (FY 2026)
- Department executives: Ahmed Tigani, Commissioner; Yegal Shamash, PE, First Deputy Commissioner
- Key document: New York City Charter
- Website: nyc.gov/dob

The New York City Department of Buildings (DOB) is the department of the New York City government that enforces the city's building codes and zoning regulations, issues building permits, licenses, registers and disciplines certain construction trades, responds to structural emergencies and inspects over 1,000,000 new and existing buildings. Its regulations are compiled in title 1 of the New York City Rules.

== History ==
Building and construction regulations have existed in New York City since its early days as New Amsterdam in the 17th century. A "Superintendent of Buildings" position was created within the Fire Department in 1860, in response to the Elm Street Fire on the Lower East Side of Manhattan, which killed 20 people. The first Buildings Department was created in Manhattan in 1892. In 1901 the New York State Legislature passed the Tenement Housing Act of 1901, which established a city Tenement Housing Department, including a Buildings Bureau and a Bureau of Inspection. A citywide Department of Buildings though did not exist until 1936.

The Department has been restructured numerous times during its existence, and the present Department of Buildings dates from 1972, when the Housing and Development Administration was split into the Department of Buildings and the Department of Housing Preservation and Development.

Former Mayor Robert F. Wagner Jr was Buildings Commissioner prior to becoming Manhattan Borough President.

== Organization ==
The Department of Buildings is overseen by a Commissioner, appointed by the Mayor, and is responsible for ensuring the agency meets the development and safety objectives determined by each current administration. The appointed commissioner is Ahmed Tigani, since January 1, 2025. The Department includes both development and enforcement units, overseen by numerous Deputy Commissioners that report directly to the agency Commissioner. The First Deputy Commissioner, with jurisdiction over all Borough Office operations, is second in command to the Commissioner and is responsible for running the agency in their absence.

There are five City Borough Offices of the Department handling permitting and enforcement for each part of the City, in addition to central enforcement staff. Each office is overseen by a Borough Commissioner and one or more Deputy Borough Commissioners that report directly to the First Deputy Commissioner. The executive offices, and numerous operational and inspection units such as the Department's Emergency Response Team are located at 280 Broadway in Manhattan providing centralized access to all five boroughs.

As of 2024, the Department has a staff of 1,500, including Plan Examiners that review building plans and permit applications, and 426 building inspectors who visit existing buildings and new construction to ensure they are safe and comply with all applicable laws and regulations. The enforcement division also includes a Building Marshal's Office. The Department issues 140,000 work permits annually, and performs 324,000 inspections each year.

The DOB contracts out building facade inspection work. This involves inspectors who are trained to inspect the facades of buildings over six stories.

== Inspectors' uniform ==
NYC Building Inspectors wear dark blue uniforms and carry badges to identify themselves as building inspectors.

== Self-Certification ==
Self-Certification, officially known as Professional Certification, is a process by which licensed professionals may bypass a full review of a building project by the New York City Department of Buildings.

According to the New York Times, the Department of Buildings has for decades allowed "...licensed professionals [to] self-certify that components of the construction process itself—installation of the girders, the bolts, the concrete, the fireproofing, the wiring and more—are performed according to code.

In 1995, under Mayor Giuliani, this program was expanded to include the design itself. With this streamlined approvals process, Registered Architects and Engineers may self-certify that a project complies with all applicable laws and codes, and the project can be approved without a full review by plan examiners (though some twenty percent of applications are randomly selected for audit).

Some Architects prefer a modified Self Certification process, first submitting a project for a normal review and receiving back a list of objections by the plan examiner, then self-certifying any revisions made in response to those objections.

=== Abuse ===
The Self Certification program has been cited by some as easy to abuse. A number of Architects have been investigated over the years by the Department of Buildings for self-certifying projects that did not actually conform to building codes and zoning regulations.

In 2002, investigators with the New York City Department of Buildings alleged that Architect Henry Radusky "failed to follow required codes" on 55 building projects". In response, Radusky agreed to voluntarily surrender his Self Certification privileges for one year.

In 2006, Architect Robert Scarano was brought before the City's Office of Administrative Trials and Hearings for alleged building code and zoning violations on a number of Self Certified projects. The allegations were mutually settled in August 2006, with Scarano surrendering his Self Certifications privileges.

The Department of Buildings announced in February 2008 that, instead of accepting self-certified plans by default, by the end of the year it would require architects and engineers to apply for the privilege.

==== Penalties ====
The usual penalty for abuse is revocation of Self Certification privileges. The Department of Buildings cannot revoke a professional's license to practice Architecture or Engineering, as that is controlled by the New York State Office of the Professions. However, since 2007 the State has allowed the DOB to refuse to accept plans filed by individuals who have been found to abuse the Self Certification process (or other regulations).

The Department of Buildings used this law for the first time in January 2008, banning engineer Leon St. Clair Nation from filing any work in the City for at least two years. Nation had allegedly filed fake plans and doctored photographs. Expediter Hershy Fekete was also implicated, but an administrative judge ruled that expediters were not covered by the 2007 law.

In February 2007, the Brooklyn AIA announced in their newsletter that the City Council had proposed revising the city's administrative code regarding misconduct related to Self Certification. The revised code would establish a process whereby architects and engineers whose self-certification privileges have been revoked could have these privileges restored after one year. A six-month probationary period would follow, and any further misconduct would result in permanent revocation of privileges.

== See also ==
- New York City Office of Administrative Trials and Hearings (OATH), for hearings conducted on summonses for quality of life violations issued by the Buildings Department
