= 1902 kosher meat boycott =

1902 New York City protest

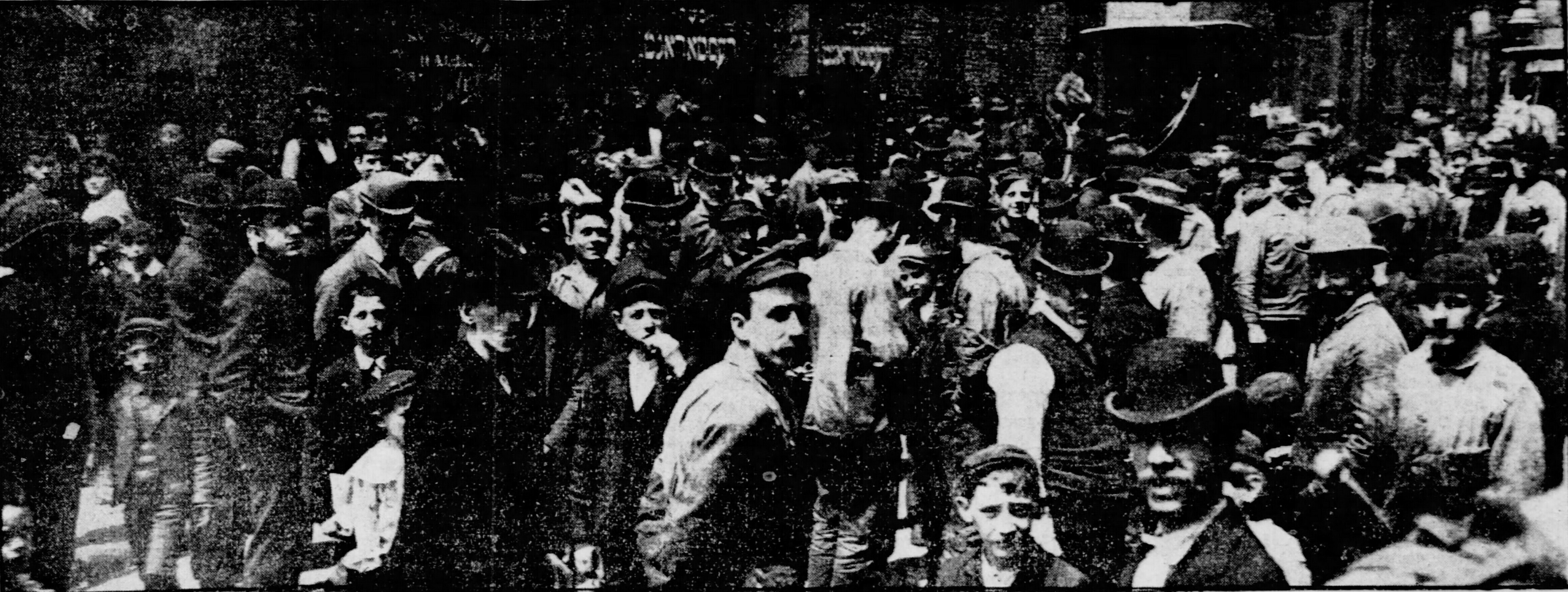
- Police making an arrest in front of kosher shop on the East Side. Patrol wagon at right of picture.: New York Tribune May 17, 1902
- Date: May 11, 1902 - June 9, 1902

Number
20,000 protesters	

Jewish women of New York City staged a boycott of kosher butchers in 1902 in response to a coordinated increase in price of kosher meat from 12 to 18 cents a pound. This increase was significant enough that many Jewish families could no longer afford to buy meat. The protests, led mainly by immigrant Jewish women on Manhattan's Lower East Side, though controversial in their often-violent tactics, were largely successful and resulted in the lowering of the price of meat to 14 cents a pound.

== Background ==
The kosher meat boycott of 1902 developed as the Gilded Age was coming to a close. The Gilded Age (1870–1900) in the United States saw powerful robber barons monopolizing a wide array of industries including the railroad, oil, steel and meat industries. These monopolies and trusts were able to dramatically increase prices in their respective industries, and prevented consumers from finding goods at a cheaper price. Though Congress passed a number of antitrust laws in the 1890s, such as the Sherman Antitrust Act, these laws were not usually enforced and the government often sided with the powerful robber barons. This continued until the election of President Theodore Roosevelt, who led a war on trusts and monopolies, gaining the title the "trust buster."

At the turn of the 20th century, the meat industry was still under the control of robber barons who in 1902 decided to hike prices. Initially, the Jewish butchers in New York City attempted to boycott the meat trust by refusing to sell meat, but the trust was too powerful and their boycott crumbled. Thus the women of the Lower East Side Jewish community were forced to take matters into their own hands, staging a large boycott and convincing many people not to buy meat.

These protests took place at a time when women were beginning to exert political influence. In addition to the rise of women's suffrage movements, the end of the 19th century saw the number of middle class American women volunteering in clubs, professional societies, and local charities increase significantly. This trend in turn lent much more strength to women's suffrage movements and provided a model for women to exert their influence in other areas, such as in the kosher meat boycott.

== Kosher meat ==
In general, kosher meat tends to be pricier than non-kosher meat due to the various restrictions and requirements that come with it. Adhering to the strict dietary laws of kashrut is a significant part of Orthodox Jewish life. The laws of kashrut can be found throughout the Torah, Mishnah, Talmud and various halachic works. The main criteria for a mammal to be kosher is that the animal must have split hooves and chew its cud. Additionally, a certified butcher known as a shochet must slaughter the animal in accordance with Jewish law in a process known as shechita. After the shechita, the animal must be checked for any life-threatening wounds which could render the animal not kosher even after being properly slaughtered. Finally many parts of the animal have to be removed such as certain fats and all the blood. The meat is then salted in order to remove any remaining blood. This lengthy process and the many steps involved are what make kosher meat more expensive than non-kosher meat. In 1902 the kosher meat was recorded to be 5-6 cents more expensive per pound than non-kosher meat, even before the price increased.

In 1902, although many American Jews began to assimilate and drop many of their religious practices, many still kept kosher. Because of this, the increase in price for kosher meat had a relatively widespread impact.

== Boycott ==
On May 11, 1902, around 400 kosher butchers on the East Side of New York organized a boycott of the meat trusts to put pressure on them to lower the cost of meat. However, the trusts were too powerful and the butchers ended their boycott. In response to those unsuccessful attempts, the women of the Lower East Side Jewish community, led by Fanny Levy and Sarah Edelson, held a massive protest. On May 15, 20,000 protesters, mostly women, took to the streets to attack the butcher shops. They smashed shop windows, poured gasoline on the meat, lit it on fire and threw pieces of meat at police officers. By the end of the day, 85 people had been arrested, 75% of them women.

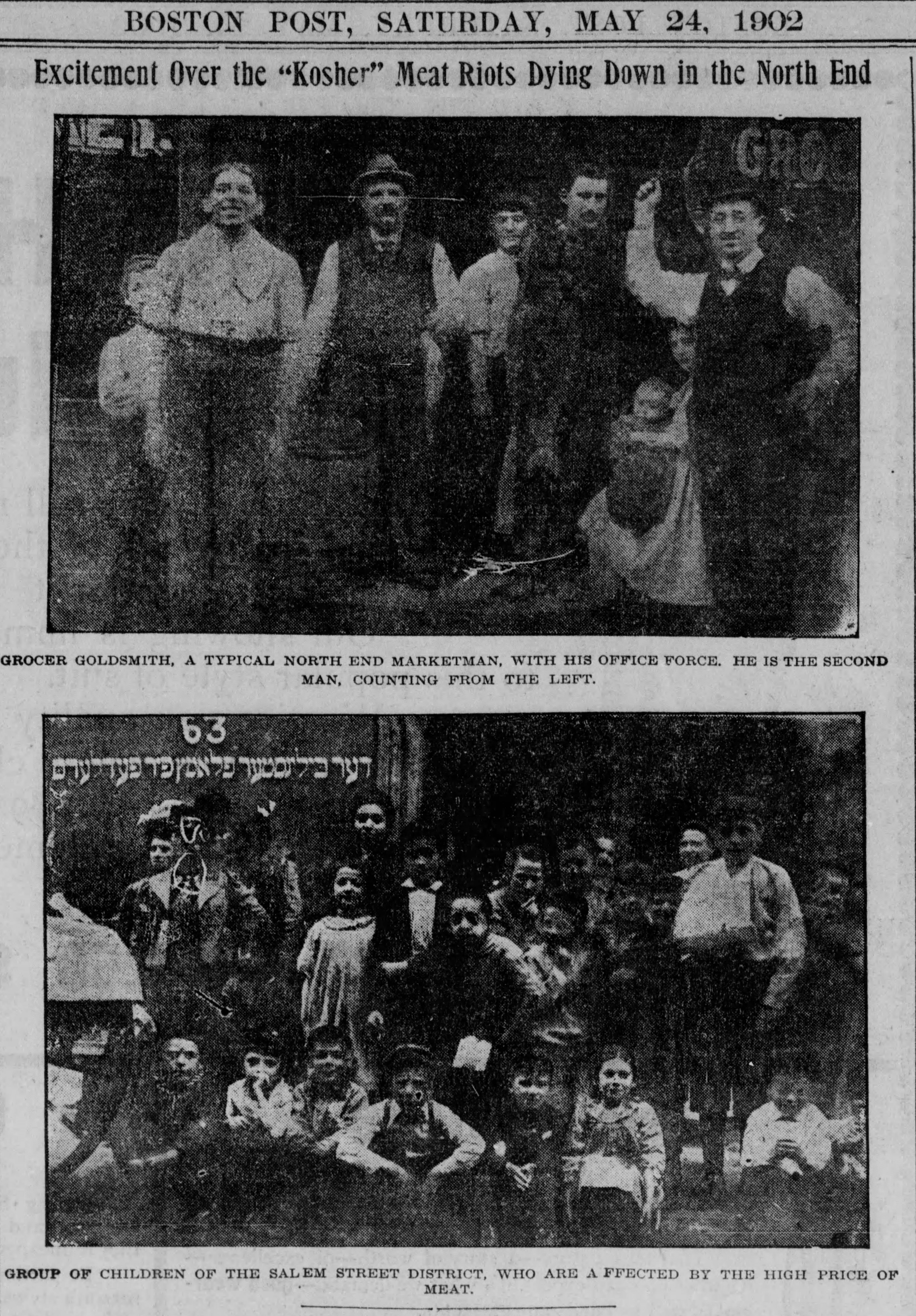

After May 15, the protests expanded into local synagogues. During Sabbath services on May 17, two days after the street riots, a group of women stormed the podium of their synagogue to direct attention towards their cause. One woman got up on the synagogue podium, disrupted the Torah reading and lectured the community about the importance of joining the boycott. She then demanded that the men in the community compel their wives to join the protestors. The strategy of promoting the boycott inside synagogues gained much attention and proved to be an effective means of gaining support within the Jewish community.

In the weeks following the riots, Jewish women of the Lower East Side continued to come up with creative ways to protest. They patrolled the streets of the Lower East Side in order to prevent other women from buying meat. In a controversial but effective move, the protesters went door to door checking everyone's pots and pans to ensure that no one was secretly buying meat. Anyone who was caught with meat was ridiculed and labeled a "scab." These tactics proved to be very effective. Almost all purchases of kosher meats ceased. While the patrols went on, other boycott members worked around the clock to disseminate flyers and circulars in order to bolster support. One such circular read: "Eat no meat while the Trust is taking meat from the bones of your women and children." Women vigilantes went as far as to rob butcher shops and rid them of their meat. The women involved in the protests also started a fundraising campaign to bail out imprisoned boycotters.

Due to the boycott's successful tactics, on May 22, the Retail Butchers Association (the kosher butchers association) realigned itself with the boycott campaign and ceased selling kosher meat in all their stores. In addition, kosher restaurants throughout NYC removed meat from their menus until the prices came back down. By May 27, major Orthodox religious leaders had publicly affirmed support for the boycott, and by June 9 the prices dropped to 14 cents a pound.

== Reactions to the protests ==
Newspapers across NYC had many different reactions to the boycott. The Forward, a Yiddish newspaper, endorsed the boycott by praising them with a newspaper title "Bravo, Bravo, Bravo, Jewish women!" Many Jewish socialists were also sympathetic to the boycott. On the other hand, The New York Times portrayed the boycott and their methods in an extremely negative light, calling the women who ran the boycott a "dangerous class." The Times saw the boycotts actions as too controversial and semi-militant, but did express support for the idea of challenging the trusts. The Tribune also denounced the method of protesting, stating that the boycotters "made life miserable for the policemen." Ida Tarbell and Lincoln Steffens, two muckraker journalists, were pleased with the boycott's exposure of the robber barons and their corrupt policies. The New York Herald came out with an article portraying the event as testimony to the impressive organizational skills of the women who put together the boycott. The newspaper stressed the role of the women in the boycott reporting that "women were the ring leaders at all hours."

== Additional impact ==
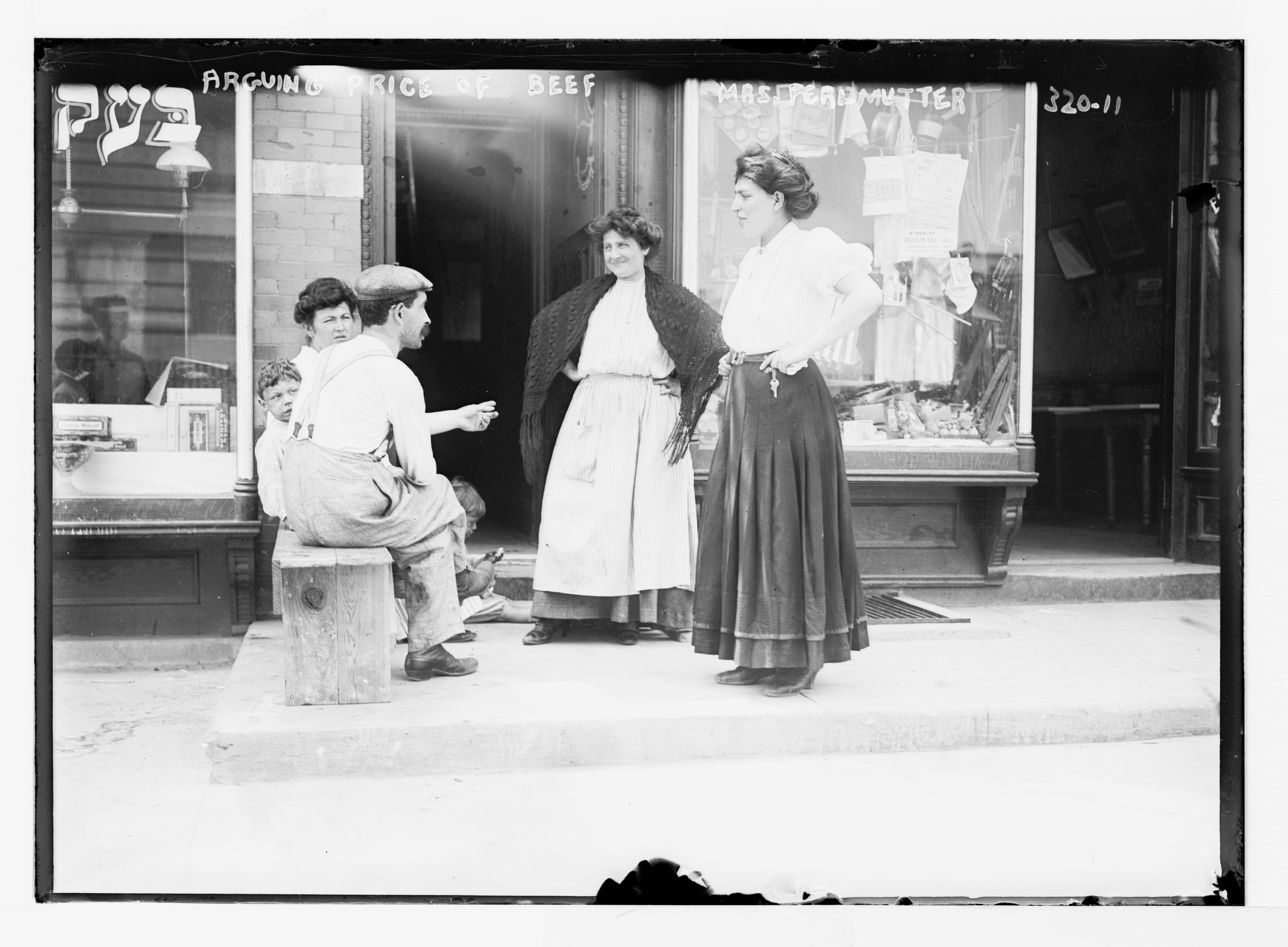
Undated photo (1900s) of Mrs. Perlmutter and others outside store arguing price of meat, Brooklyn, NY

The boycott became so popular that its influence eventually spread to other Jewish communities in Harlem, Brooklyn, Newark, Boston, and Philadelphia, where similar protests took place. Many of the women who organized the kosher meat boycott of 1902 as well as their children played a significant role in the New York Labor movement, most notably the garment labor union.

In 1907 and 1908 rent boycotts broke out on the lower east side of Manhattan to protest high rent prices. They publicly acknowledged that the inspiration for the boycott and the tactics used derived from the meat boycott of 1902.

In 1910, a meat boycott also occurred across the US primarily the Midwest, in part likely inspired by the 1902 kosher boycott.
