= A Stoop on Orchard Street =

A Stoop on Orchard Street is a musical by Jay Kholos. The story, inspired by a visit to the Lower East Side Tenement Museum, is a nostalgic look at the year 1910. The musical premiered Off-Broadway in 2003, where it enjoyed a long run. It has since been revived several times.

== Productions ==
A Stoop on Orchard Street was first performed in a workshop at the Gordon Jewish Community Center, Nashville, Tennessee, in November 2002. The musical ran successfully Off-Broadway at The Mazer Theatre on the Lower East Side of New York City for a year and a half. The musical started in previews on July 8, 2003 with an opening night on August 7, 2003; it closed on November 14, 2004. The production was directed by Lon Gary and orchestrated by Tom Berger and Jeffrey Campos. It reported a total income of 2,650,000 unusual for a non-Equity musical housed in a 172-seat theater.

Stoop also toured in North America, starting at the North Shore Center for the Performing Arts, Skokie, Illinois in October 2004, and also appearing in Los Angeles, (Canoga Park) (2005), San Francisco, and the Leah Posluns Theatre, Ontario (October 2004), with a separate company in Florida. In a regional production, it played at the Helen Hayes Theatre Company, Nyack, New York in December 2004.

== Synopsis ==
On the Lower East Side of Manhattan on Orchard Street, in 1910, Eastern European immigrants, the Lomansky Family, begin a new life in America. An old vaudeville actor, Benny Lomansky, recalls his poverty-stricken childhood and the gossip around the tenement stoop, reliving the struggles and triumphs of his family and neighbors. He remembers that his father Hiram, who worked long hours for little pay, was envious of the lifestyle of his more affluent Americans. Hiram eventually abandons his family.

== Roles and original principal cast ==
- Lon Gary (The Old Man)
- Joel Halstead (The Cop/Guard)
- Joseph Spiotta (Benny Lomansky)
- Stuart Marshall (Shlomo)
- Scott Steven Wagner (Sam)
- David Mendell (Hiram Lomansky)
- Eleni Delopoulos (Ruth Lomansky)
- Deborah Grausman (Seama Lomansky)
- John Kirkwood (Simon)
- Anne Tonelson (The Bubbie)
- Stephanie Wilberding (Mrs. Lipschitz)
- Lili Corn (Immigrant Woman)
- Sarah Matteucci (Sarah)
- Edward Anthony (Sid Lipschitz)
- Kristian Hunter Lazzaro (Kovasky)
- Valerie David (The Volunteer)
- Matthew La Clair (Benny Lomansky, alt.)
- Jonathan Schneidman (Benny Lomansky, alt.)
- Selby Brown (Shlomo/Lipschitz, alt.)

== Musical numbers ==
Act One

- Overture - Orchestra
- Melting Pot - Company
- Why Don't They Go Back - The Cop and Company
- I Remember When (I Was Ten) - The Old Man
- At the Palace - Benny and Company
- The Grass Ain't Always Greener - Sam, Hiram and Men
- More to Me - Hiram and Ruth
- Here's to Our Children - Ruth and The Bubbie
- I Remember When (No TV) - The Old Man
- The Stoop - Women
- Sarah - Simon and Sarah
- Human Kindness - Ruth
- I Remember When (Hot Summer Nights - The Old Man
- The Stoop - Men
- Lipschitz - Lipschitz, Kovasky, Shlomo and Men
- Benny's Ditty - Benny
- Gold Beneath My Feet - Sam, Shlomo, Benny and Hiram

Act Two

- I Remember When (Stoopball) - The Old Man
- Man of the Family - Benny
- Bubbie Song - The Bubbies and Bubbies
- In the Hands of Strangers - Sarah and Sick Immigrants
- Another Man's Wife/Another Dreamer - Sam and Ruth
- Best Day of My Life - Seama
- Man of the Family (Reprise) - Benny
- I Remember When (Lives Improved) - The Old Man
- Across the Brooklyn Bridge - Company
- Americans/Finale - Company

== Response ==
The New York Times reviewer wrote that "This show -- one man's memories of his childhood on the Lower East Side almost a century ago -- is mostly self-important sentimentality, uninspired dancing and music with a badly recycled ring...the well-meaning, affectionately told story of a struggling immigrant Jewish family."

The talkinbroadway reviewer wrote that " 'A Stoop on Orchard Street', while far too gentle to be placed along similar shows like 'Ragtime', 'Rags', or 'Fiddler on the Roof', often feels right at home where it's landed in the Mazer Theater. If sometimes staidly educational in its outlook and execution, the show is inherently intriguing and moving by benefit of its venue, in an area central to the lives of the early 20th century immigrants it documents. That authenticity would be hard to match elsewhere.
