= Lawrence Veiller =

American urban planner

- Born: January 7, 1872
- Died: August 30, 1959 (aged 87); New York City, NY, USA
- Occupations: Housing reformer, urban planner
- Known for: Standard State Zoning Enabling Act

Lawrence Turnure Veiller (January 7, 1872–August 30, 1959) was an American social reformer of the Progressive Era in New York. A major figure in tenement policy, urban planning, and good government movements of the early twentieth century, he has been described as "the most important housing reformer in the country."

Vellier shaped the legal basis of American city planning over the 20th century. Working with Jacob Riis and other New York reformers, Veiller published model housing laws intended to eliminate cheap tenement units, now the backbone of housing codes. Later, he drafted the Standard State Zoning Enabling Act, a statute that introduced the zoning scheme widely used in municipalities across the United States.

Critics have argued that Veiller's efforts at supply regulation made housing worse for the poor. Historian and Atlantic editor Yoni Appelbaum asserts that Veiller "did everything in his power to make housing more expensive" and that his reforms raised rents for those living in apartments and tenements. He was opposed to immigration and criticized what he saw as an "abnormal increase of population through immigration".

== Early life and education ==
Lawrence Turnure Veiller was born in Elizabeth, New Jersey on January 7, 1872. Lawrence Veiller was the son of broker and factory owner Philip Veiller and Elizabeth du Puy. Lawrence attended school in many states such as Massachusetts, Illinois, and New York. He graduated from the City College of New York in New York City in 1890. He took interest in social work by elaborating solutions for poor, harmful living conditions.

== Career ==
Veiller began his career with the Charity Organization Society (COS) as a volunteer, then worked as plans manager for the Buildings Department of the City of New York gaining knowledge about housing construction and finance (1895-1897). He was especially concerned with housing conditions among the poor, which he viewed as a crucial to broader social improvement.

Veiller served as executive officer of the Tenement House Committee (1898-1907). Veiller produced a Tenement Exhibition, consisting of visuals that where examples of the proposals to be set in New York City (1900). He then became secretary of the New York State Tenement House Commission (1900–01) through which he helped draft the New York State Tenement House Act (1901), which established basic housing laws in the city such as iron-platform fire escapes and running water for bathrooms in every tenement. Veiller understood the importance of publicity in gaining support for his cause, and to this end worked with journalists like Jacob Riis, who used photography to document the living conditions of the poor.

Veiller believed that all tenements had a "very bad effect on American life" and that no apartment buildings could provide a "proper home". He attempted to use fire safety as a means of imposing stricter regulations on multifamily dwellings only, while avoiding targeting single family homes.

Veiller’s participation in housing affairs ended 1917. He still took interest of New York City’s urban reformation. He worked for traffic regulation, expansion of subway transportation, and control of franchises.

Veiller widely promoted New York's "districting" scheme to separate residential properties from other land uses. In 1921, Veiller was appointed to the Advisory Committee on City Planning and Zoning, an expert panel convened by Commerce Secretary Herbert Hoover. Veiller was the principal author of the 17-page model statute, A Standard State Zoning Enabling Act under which Municipalities Can Adopt Zoning Regulations.

After Lawrence Veiller’s active years of social reformation and regulation, his ideas fell out of favor. It became difficult to encourage quality construction regulations and control on housing for the poor. It became unaffordable to maintain, due to the Depression of 1929, his reforms for housing the poor ultimately receded.

== Marriage and family ==
In 1897, Veiller married Amy Hall; they had no children.

His brother, Bayard Veiller, was a New York playwright known best for his script for Within the Law.

== Publications ==
=== Books ===
- Housing Conditions and Tenement Laws in Leading American Cities (1900), Evening Post Job Printing House
- The Tenement House Problem (1903) with Robert W. De Forest
- A Model Tenement House Law (1910), Russell Sage Foundation
- Housing Reform: A Hand-Book for Practical Use in American Cities (1910), Russell Sage Foundation
- The National Housing Association (1910)
- A Model Housing Law (1914, revised ed., 1920)

=== Reports ===
- Housing Conditions and Tenement Laws in Leading American Cities (1900)
- Tenement House Fires in New York (1900) with Hugh Bonner
- Report of Mayor's Push-Cart Commission of the City of New York (1906)
- The Brooklyn Bridge Problem and Its Solution (1906), with William C. Redfield and William A. Clark.
- Three Years of Progress in New York's Police Courts (1913)
- Industrial Housing Developments in America: A Development of Group Houses (1918)

=== Essays ===
- Industrial Housing Developments in America, Architectural Record (1918)
- The Rising Tide of Crime, World's Work (1925)
- How the Law Saves the Criminal, World's Work (1926)
- Where American Justice Fails,World's Work (1926)
- The Way to War on Crime, World's Work (1926)

=== Speeches ===
- "The Safe Load of Population on Land." (1910) In Proceedings of the Second National Conference on City Planning, Rochester, 72-79. New York: National Conference on City Planning.
- "Buildings in Relation to Street and Site" (1911) In Proceedings of the Third National Conference on City Planning, Philadelphia, 113–117. New York: National Conference on City Planning.
- "Protecting Residential Districts." (1914) In Proceedings of the Sixth National Conference on City Planning, Toronto, 92–110. New York: National Conference on City Planning.
- "Districting by Municipal Regulation." (1916). In Proceedings of the Eighth National Conference on City Planning, Cleveland, 147–178. New York: National Conference on City Planning.
- Slumless America." (1919). In Proceedings of the Twelth National Conference on City Planning, Cincinnati, Ohio, pp. 154-161
- "Mistakes To Be Avoided in Zoning." (1923) Printed in National Real Estate Journal
