= Robert Scarano Jr. =

American architect

- Born: September 23, 1959 (age 67); Gravesend, Brooklyn, New York
- Occupation: Architect
- Awards: 15-time winner of SARA local and national awards, 10-time winner of local Brooklyn AIA awards, and AIA national awards
- Practice: Scarano Architects, PLLC
- Buildings: 297 Driggs Ave, Brooklyn, NY
- Projects: Bright 'n Green

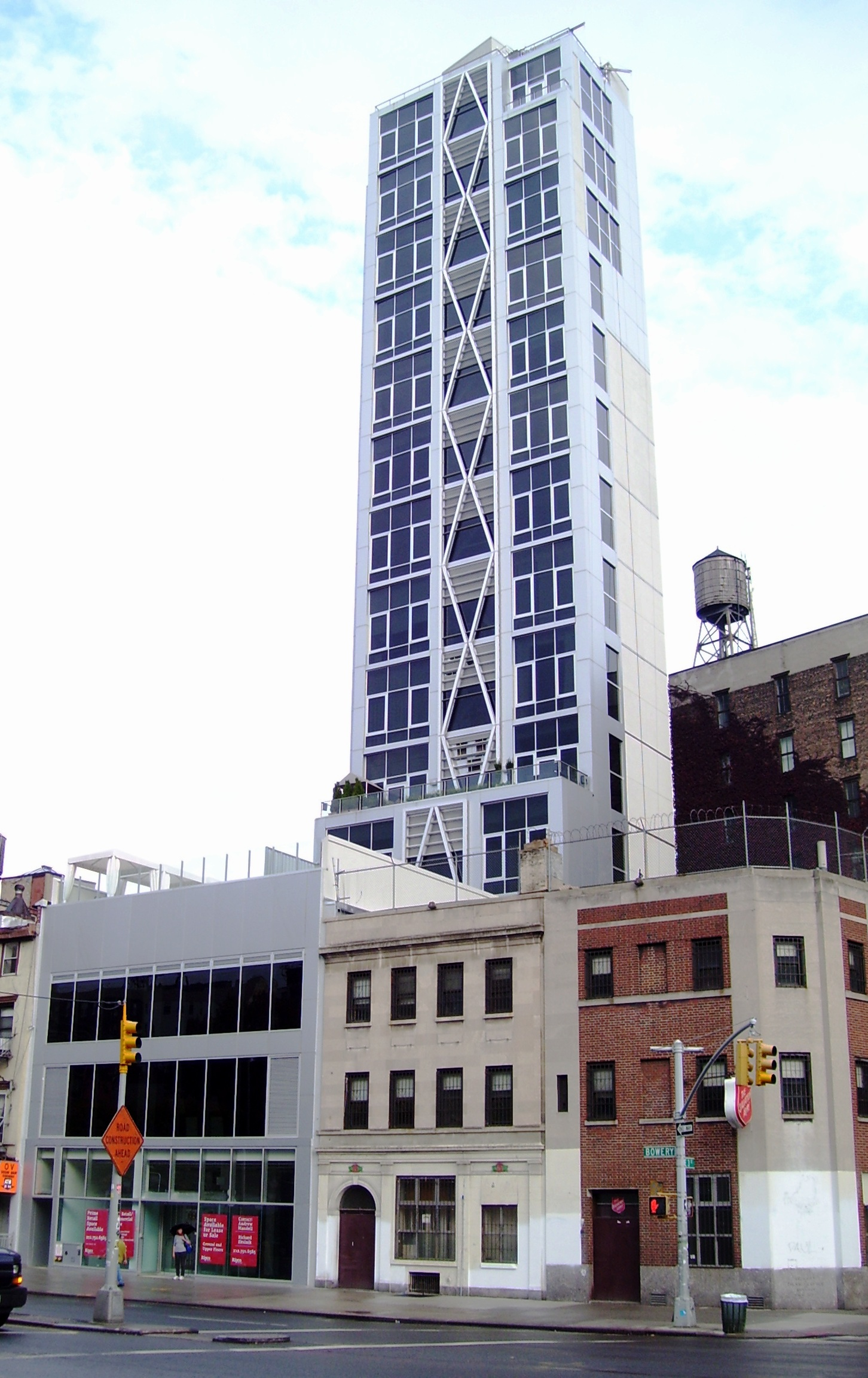
Scarano's condominium tower at 52 East 4th Street, also known as 351-353 Bowery, in Manhattan

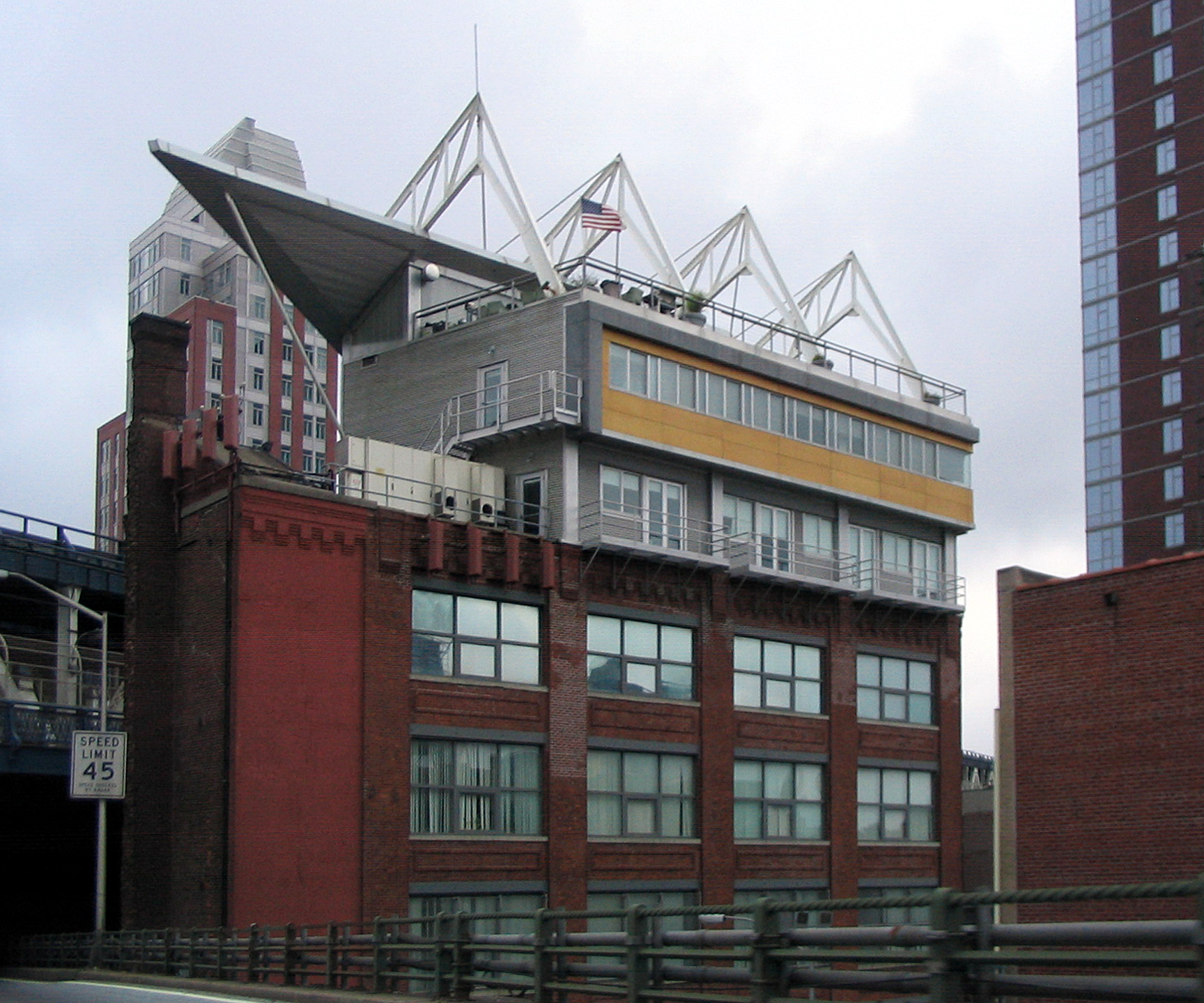
Scarano Architects office at 110 York Street in Downtown Brooklyn

Scarano-designed condominiums at 57-59 Maspeth Avenue in Bushwick, Brooklyn feature double-height units with mezzanines

Robert Michael Scarano Jr. is an American architect who works primarily in Brooklyn, New York City.

== Life and career ==
Born in Gravesend, Brooklyn, Scarano attended the City College of New York, where he received a Bachelor of Architecture, Bachelor of Science in Architecture and Environmental Design, and a certificate in engineering. He later studied at New York University and received certificates in construction management, building construction, real estate development and real estate finance.

He started his own firm, Scarano Architects PLLC, in Staten Island in 1985, the same year in which he became a Registered Architect in New York State. Prior to founding his firm, he worked for HLW Architects, SLCE Architects, Liebman & Liebman Architects and Costas Kondylis Architects. As of 2004, Scarano Associates had a staff of about 50, including designers from Brazil, Bulgaria, Colombia, Israel, Russia and Ukraine. Based in DUMBO, Brooklyn, their office features a glass and steel addition atop a hundred-year-old building.

Scarano is a member of the American Institute of Architects (AIA) and the Society of American Registered Architects (SARA).

== Works ==
- 110 York Street (2004) - Home to the offices of Scarano Architect PLLC, this project features a glass and steel addition atop a hundred-year-old building. This project received a 2005 Design Award from Metal Architecture magazine, and a 2005 Certificate of Appreciation from the Brooklyn AIA.
- 234 West 20th Street (2005) - Penthouse addition to an existing building in Chelsea, Manhattan. Received a 2005 Award of Excellence from the Brooklyn AIA.
- 401 Hicks Street (2005) - Adaptive reuse of a 19th-century church building in Cobble Hill, Brooklyn. Received a 2005 Certificate of Appreciation from the Brooklyn AIA.
- Armory Towers (2000) - An adaptive reuse of an old armory in Fort Greene, Brooklyn. Developed with assistance from the New York City Housing Development Corporation (NYCHDC), this 110 unit building received an Excellence Award from the NY Council of SARA, and an Excellence Award from the Brooklyn Chamber of Commerce.
- The Douglass (2005) - New construction at 279 West 117th Street in Harlem. 138 units, with 42 units reserved for low-income tenants. Honored as 2005 Project of the Year by the New York State Association for Affordable Housing.
- Finger Building (2005) - Scarano partnered with developers Mendel Brach and Moshe Oknin on this project at 144 North 8th Street in Williamsburg, Brooklyn. Commonly known as the Finger Building, it was designed for 16 stories and 42 residential units.
- Manhattan Park Condos (2006) - 14 unit, seven-story building at 297 Driggs Avenue, adjacent to McCarren Park in Greenpoint, Brooklyn. This project received a Housing Award of Merit from the NY Council of SARA.
- Toy Factory Lofts (2004) - Once home to a factory, this 64,000-square-foot (5,900 m^{2}) building at 176 Johnson Street in downtown Brooklyn was converted to 56 luxury condominiums. This project won a 2004 SARA Design Award of Honor, and was awarded a Certificate of Appreciation from the Brooklyn AIA.
- Finger Building (2005–present) - Scarano partnered with developers Mendel Brach and Moshe Oknin on this project at 144 North 8th Street in Williamsburg, Brooklyn. Commonly known as the Finger Building, it was designed for 16 stories and 42 residential units.
- 333 Carroll Street (2006–present) - now called the "Hell Building" by critics, owner Isaac Fischman hired Scarano to design an addition and renovation to convert this 19th-century building in Carroll Gardens, Brooklyn into luxury condominiums. Construction has been halted three times, most recently March 2008, after the Building Department determined that "...Scarano had inaccurately claimed the building was zoned to allow for the additional stories." Scarano was removed from the project in January 2008; the building remains unfinished.
- 360 Smith Street (2007) - this proposed building in Carroll Gardens, Brooklyn, to be designed by Scarano for developer William Stein, would be built on the site of the south entrance (and adjacent plaza) of the Carroll Street subway station. In response to this and other projects, the Carroll Gardens Neighborhood Association has proposed seeking re-zoning or landmark designation for the neighborhood.
  At a community meeting on February 11, 2008, the developer announced that Scarano was no longer involved with the project, and the building would instead be designed by Armand Quadrini of KSQ Architects.
- 614 7th Avenue (2005–06) - this condominium project in Greenwood Heights, Brooklyn drew community opposition to its proposed 70-foot (21 m) height, which would have blocked a historic sight line between the Statue of Liberty and the statue of Minerva in Green-Wood Cemetery. Neighborhood residents successfully petitioned the city to rezone the neighborhood to prevent tall buildings. The developer, Chaim Nussencweig, argued that the building's foundations had been laid before the rezoning took effect, giving him the right to complete the structure, and offered to have Scarano "cut out" a portion of the building to preserve the line of sight.
- 979 Willoughby Avenue (2007–10) - built in Bushwick, Brooklyn and marketed as a "small building big on design", this Scarano-designed condominium comprises eight apartments from 500 to 1,000 square feet (93 m^{2}). The $3.8-million project was filed as a four-story building, but towers over neighboring structures due to high ceilings and mezzanine spaces. The street wall is a row of garage doors, as each unit features a small private garage bay opening onto the sidewalk. Speaking of the project in 2007, Scarano told the Brooklyn Daily Eagle that "to design a new building in an emerging area, one cannot help but feel like a pioneer during the early days of the development of America."
- Bowery Tower (2004–06) - this Scarano-designed project at 4 East Third Street in Manhattan was originally filed with the building department as a dormitory building. Questions were raised about the building's compliance with zoning regulations, and the unfinished building was eventually sold to another group of developers. A new architect was brought on board, the facade and interiors redone, and the building now serves as a hotel.
- Washington Condominium (2006) - At this project in Prospect Heights, Brooklyn, the City objected to areas within the building labeled as 'storage lofts', but with ceiling heights greater than five feet (the limit for a non-habitable mezzanine). The developer added raised plywood floors to lower the ceiling height. When critics charged that buyers would easily rip out the retrofits to gain access to the full-height of the space, the City held up the Certificate of Occupancy until the floors were rebuilt with concrete.

== Awards and honors ==
In April 2005, Scarano received the first annual "Brooklyn Icon" award, presented by Brooklyn Borough President Marty Markowitz at a ceremony at Scarano's office attended by over 100 builders, developers and architects. Since 2005, Scarano has earned over 30 construction awards.

== Controversy ==
=== Loss of building department filing privileges ===
In March 2010, Scarano lost his rights to submit new building plans to the New York City Department of Buildings (DOB). This ban is still in effect. The ruling came in response to a June 2008 DOB action alleging "false or misleading statements on applications submitted to the Buildings Department in connection with two new buildings in Brooklyn.". According to DOB, Scarano's filings deliberately misrepresented the size of his proposed buildings, which were larger than he was claiming in his filings.

In her March 2010 ruling, Judge Joan Salzman agreed with DOB, calling Scarano's filings "so deceptive that they call to mind out-and-out fraud."

In response to the ruling, Scarano sued DOB, attempting to overturn a city statute that "can be used to bar an architect from filing for permits". The suit alleged that the statute was "unconstitutional because it lacked due process; it was poorly drafted with a 'meager' standard; and could be applied arbitrarily". An appeals court upheld the ban in 2011, saying DOB could "no longer rely on (Scarano) to submit honest paperwork." Scarano said that he would explore his legal options in response.

This ban was the second time in four years that the NYC Department of Buildings brought charges against Scarano. In 2006, Scarano was brought before the city's Office of Administrative Trials and Hearings for alleged zoning violations. The allegations were mutually settled in August 2006 with the settlement specifying that it was "not an admission of guilt or liability" by Scarano and the DOB agreed to keep private "any information or documents that form the basis for the [department's] assertions and allegations."

=== Building codes and zoning ===
Under the New York City system of zoning, buildings are regulated for things such as height, floor area, setbacks, and number of dwelling units. These regulations vary by neighborhood and street.

Many of the buildings designed by Scarano's firm are instantly recognizable for being much larger than neighboring buildings. This is often due to the double-height spaces and mezzanine levels commonly used on his residential projects to maximize building height, floor area, and lot coverage. Under the New York City building codes, mezzanines (defined in part as spaces with ceiling heights of less than five feet) are not included when calculating the square footage of a building, but it has been alleged that many of Scarano's building plans classified habitable space as mezzanines.

Speaking with a reporter in April 2006, Scarano defended himself, saying:

If you're allowed 60 percent lot coverage and 55 feet (17 m) in height and the allowable floor area is a 2.0 FAR and that gives you three-and-a-half floors, what do you do with the extra height? We pushed that into the living spaces, creating double-height units with mezzanines. And you want that space in the living room and dining room and maybe the main bedroom, but not in the other rooms (kitchens, baths, home office etc). And we were allowed to exclude the mezzanines from the floor area based on memorandums that were circulating in the 1980s.

=== Worker death ===
In March 2006, construction worker Anthony Duncan was killed at a Scarano-designed project under construction at 733 Ocean Parkway, Brooklyn, when a retaining wall gave way and the adjacent structure collapsed. The city reported 29 fatal construction accidents from September 30, 2005, to September 30, 2006—a sharp rise from the 2004–2005 year.

== Gallery ==
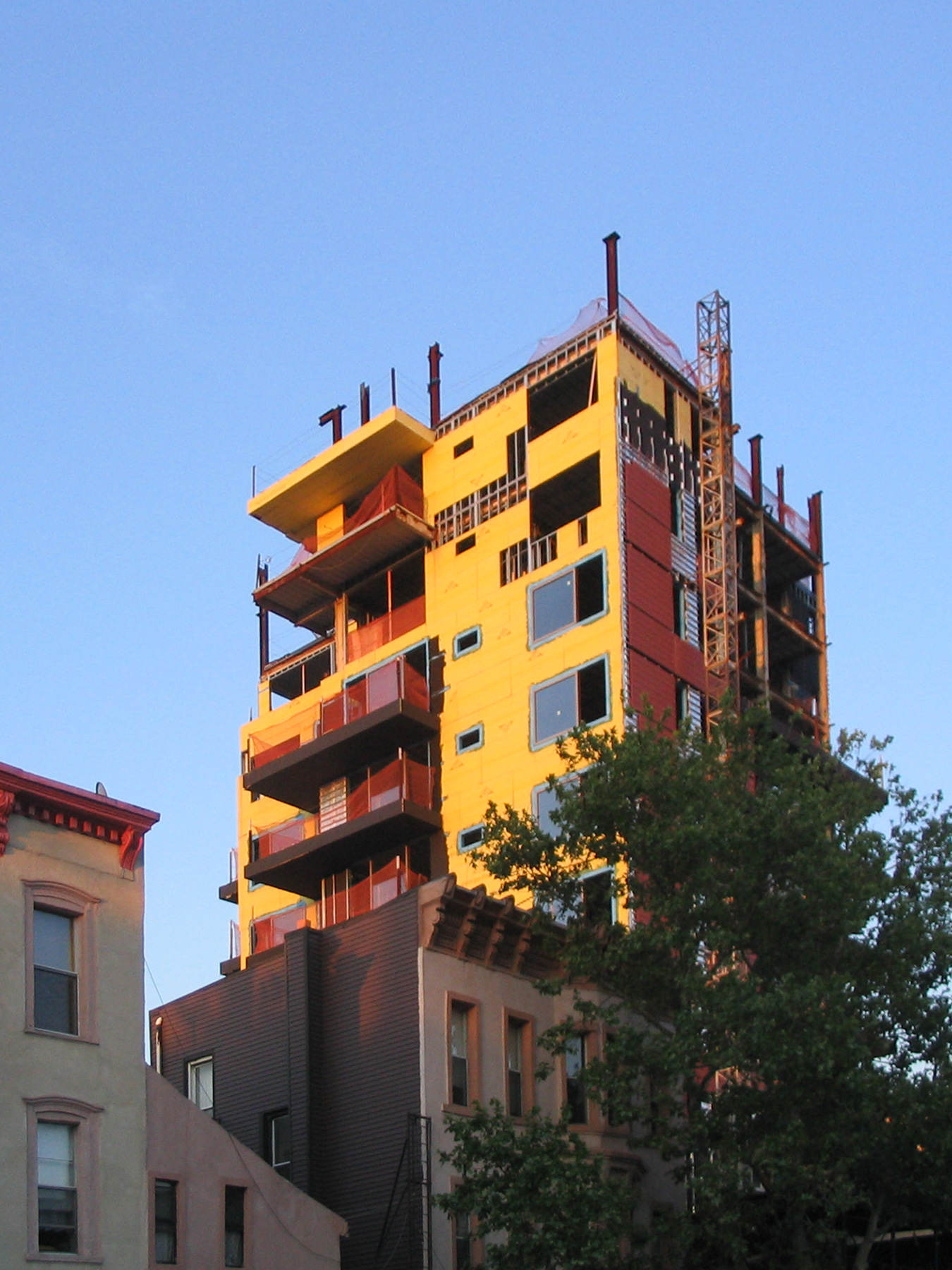
"Finger Building"
144 N. 8th Street
Williamsburg, Brooklyn

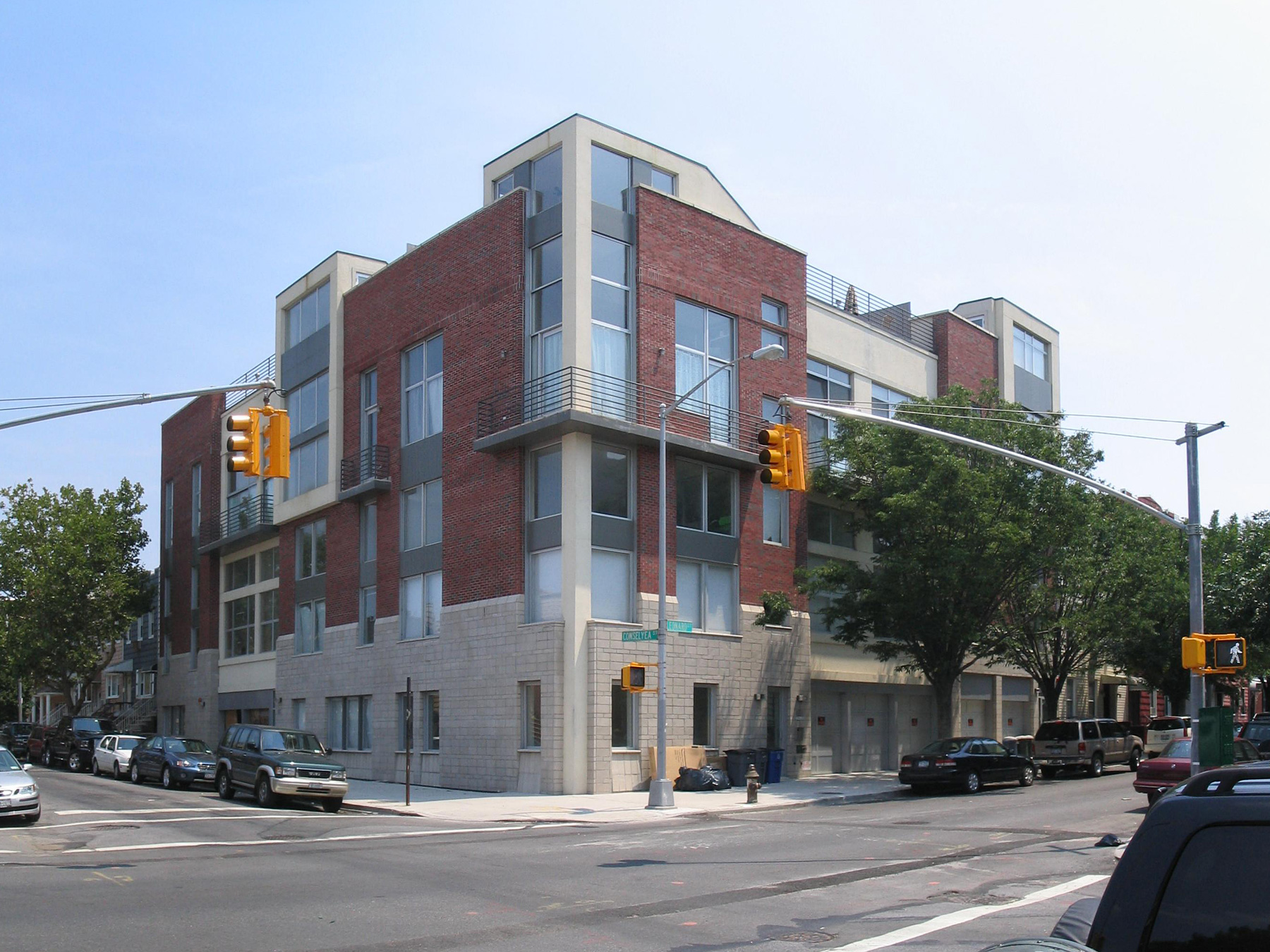
"The Casa"
88 Conselyea St.
Williamsburg, Brooklyn

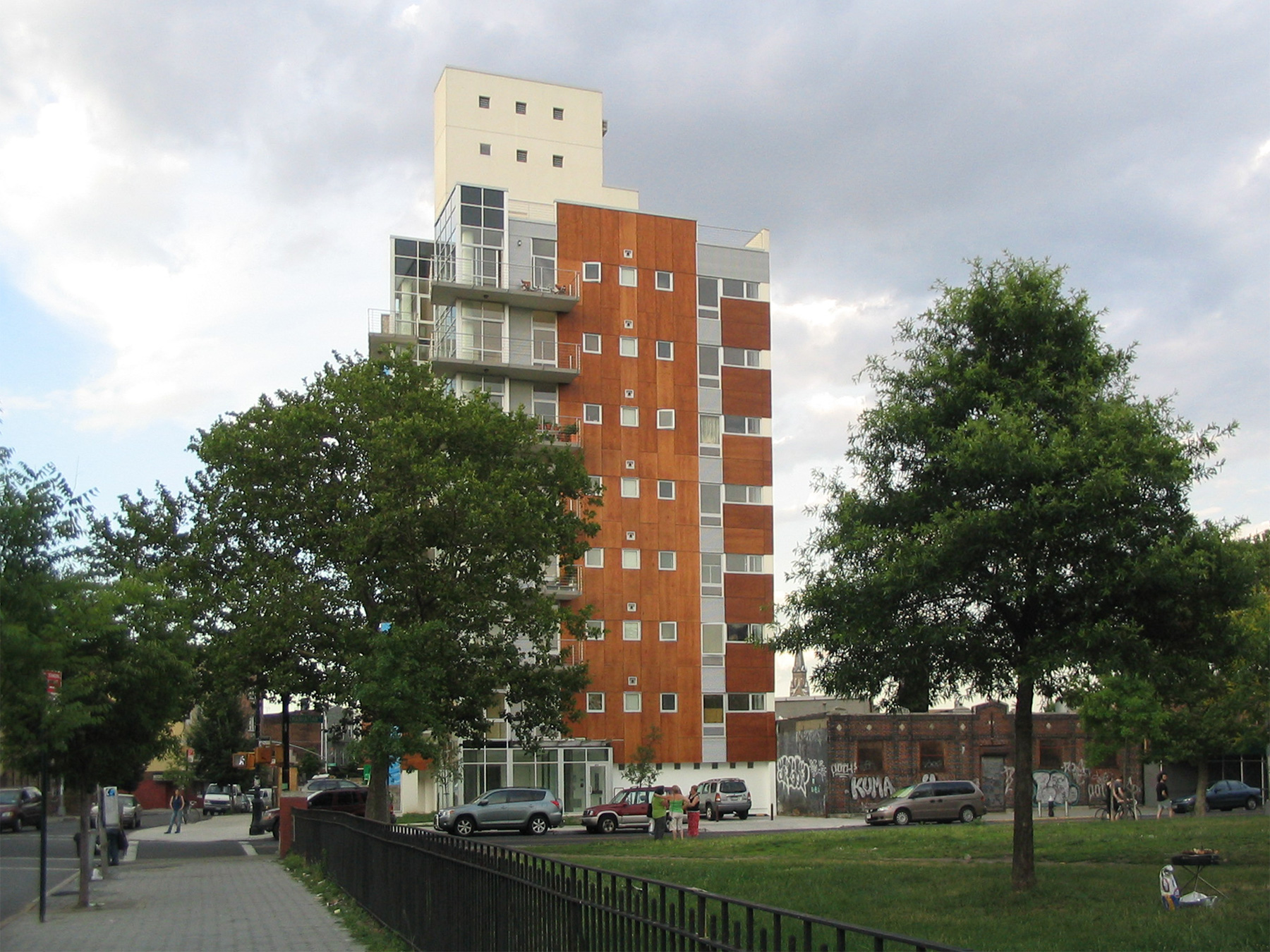
"Manhattan Park Condos"
297 Driggs Ave.
Brooklyn

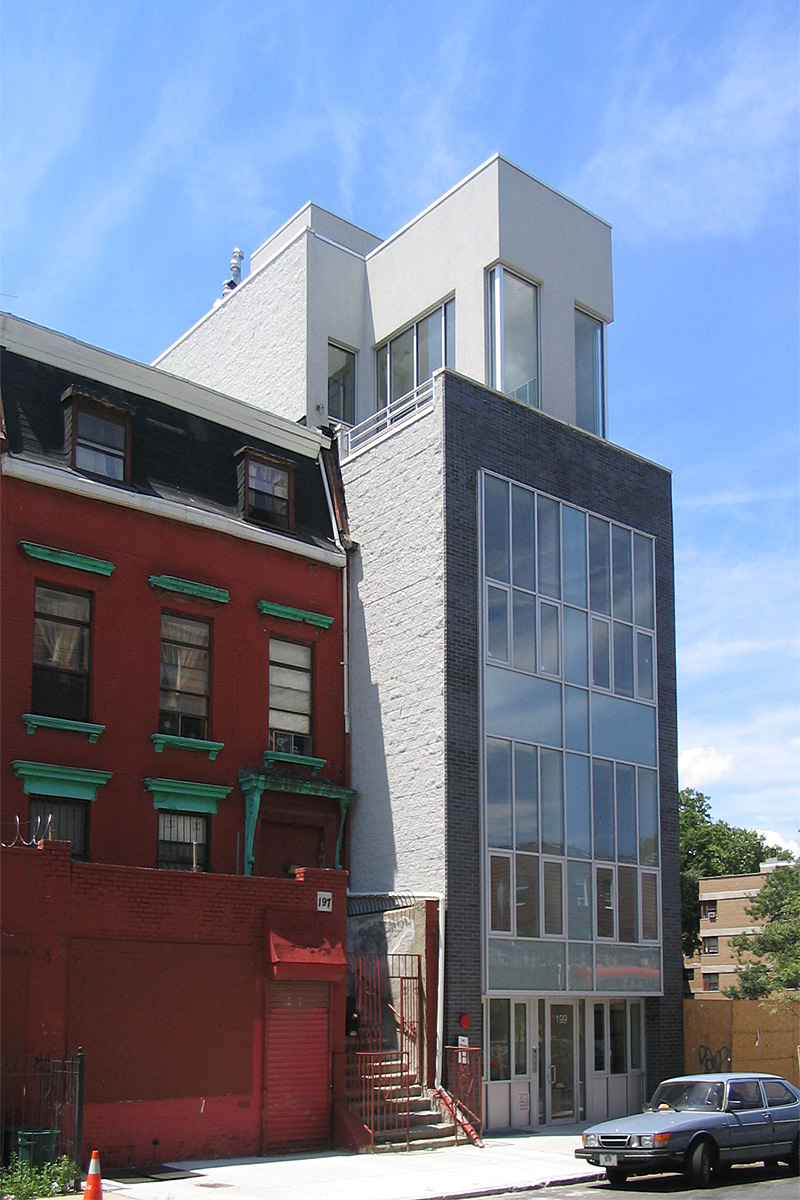
199 Humboldt St.
Brooklyn

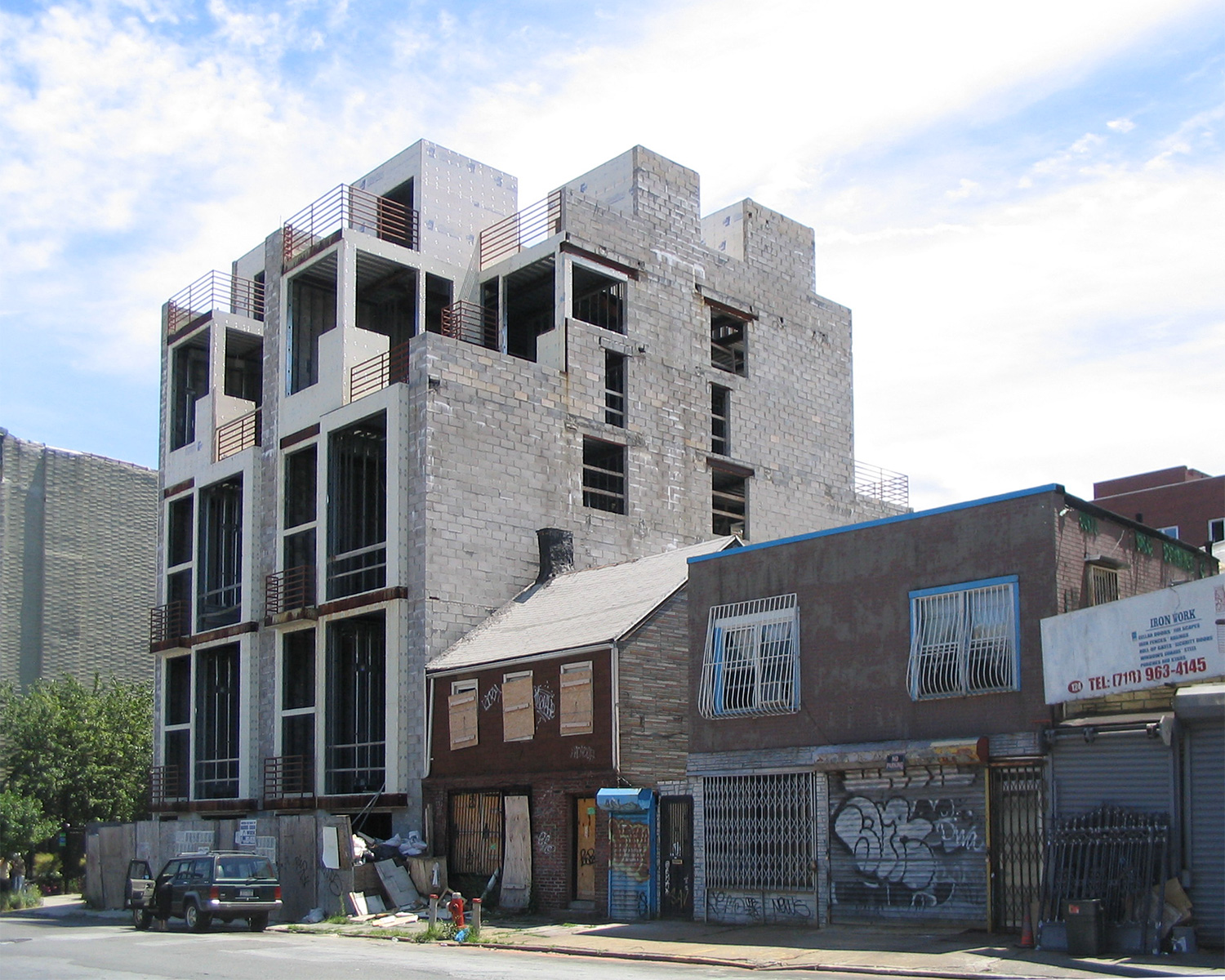
"The Phoenix"
130-132 Scholes St.
Brooklyn

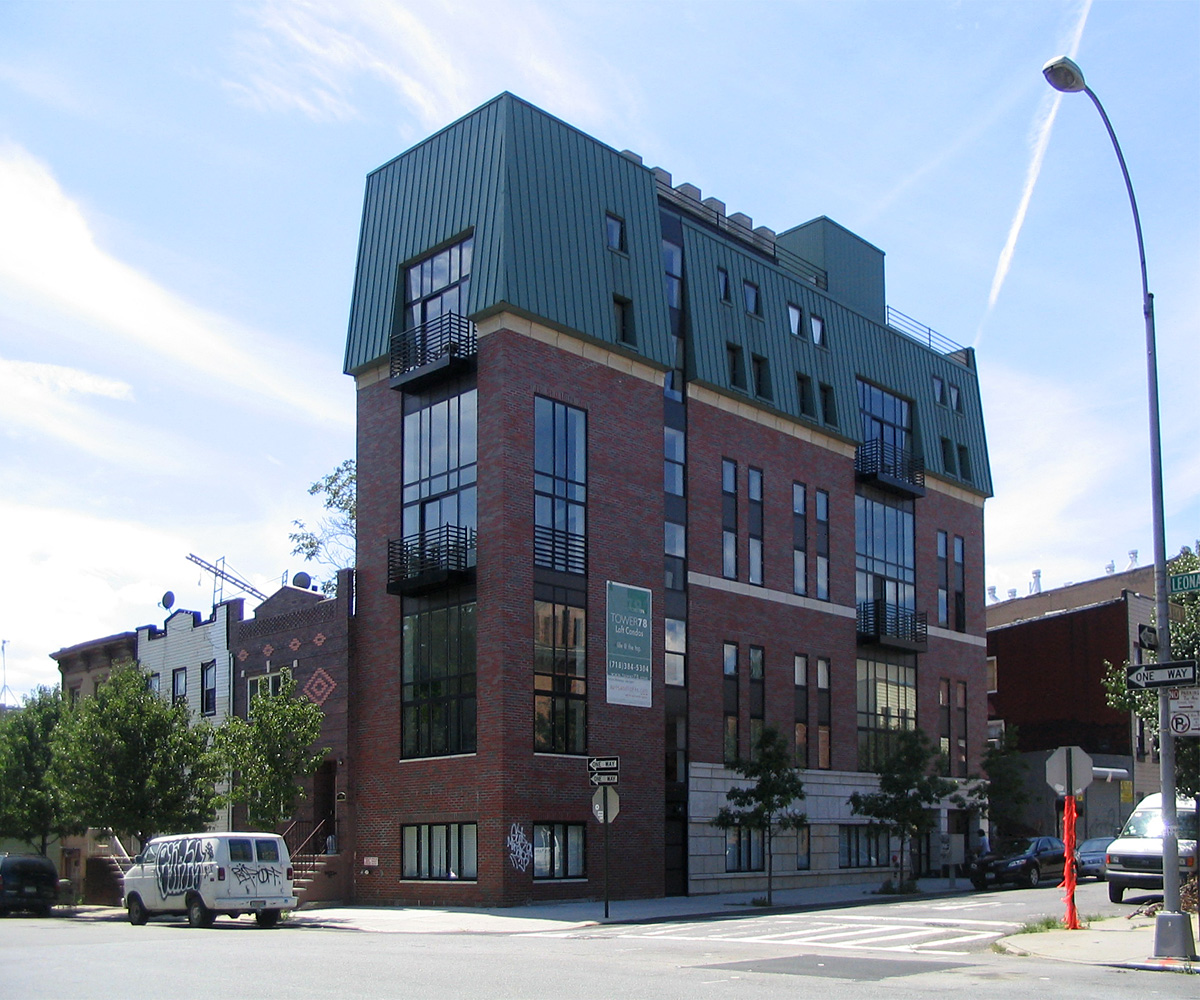
"Tower 78"
78 Ten Eyck St.
Brooklyn

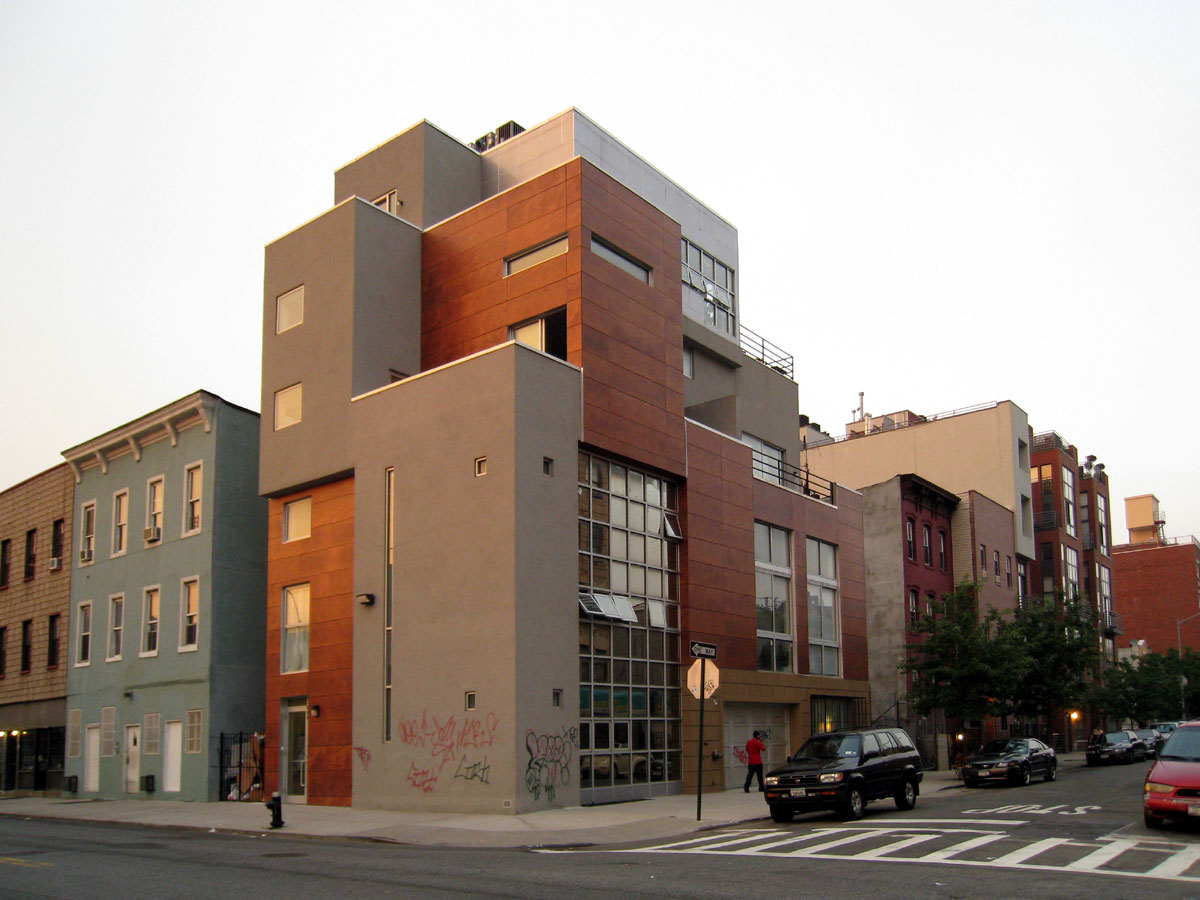
406 Lorimer St.
Brooklyn

231 16th St.
South Brooklyn

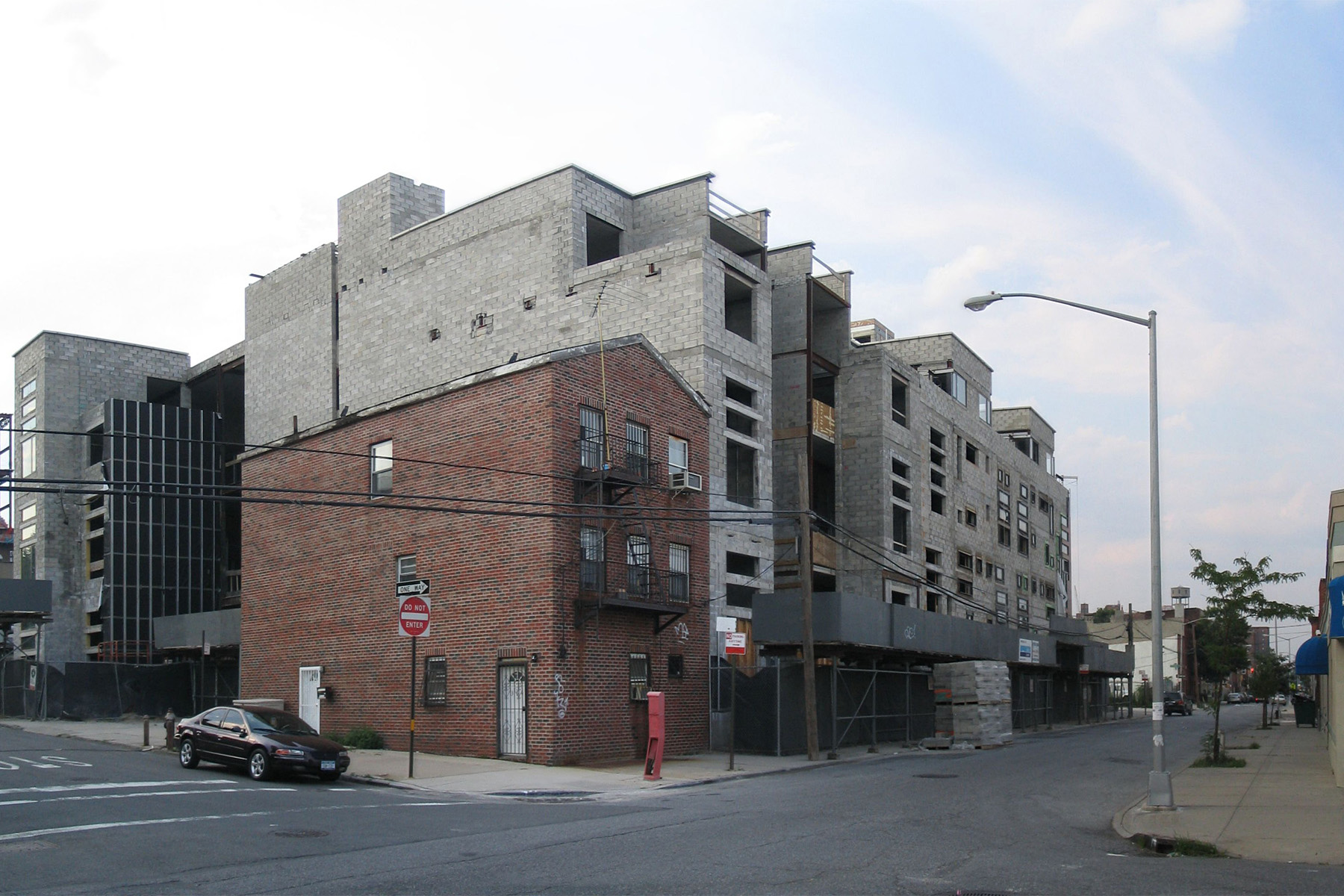
340 Bond St.
South Brooklyn
