= New York State Tenement House Act =

1901 legislation

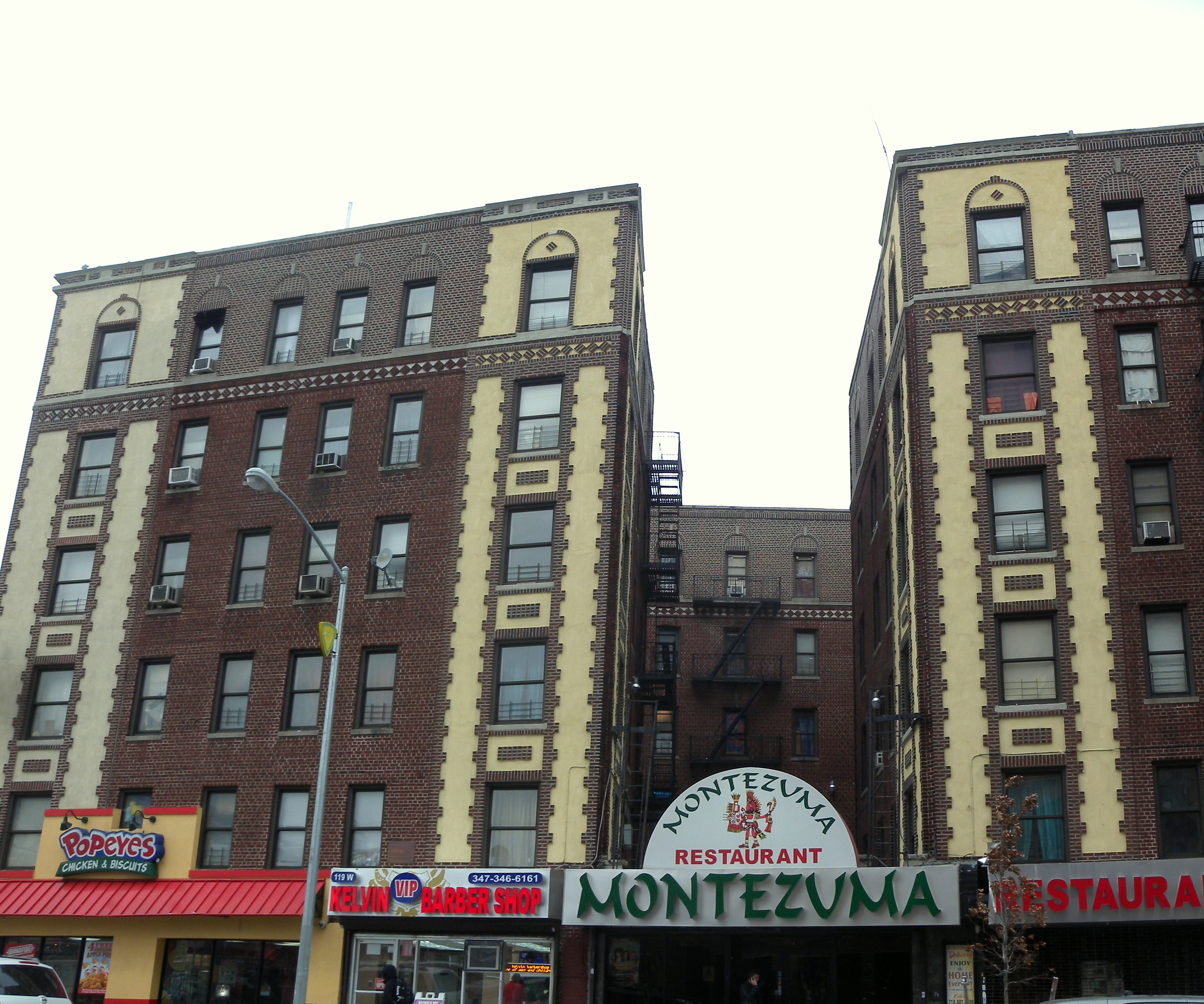
New Law tenement in The Bronx

The New York State Tenement House Acts were a series of legal reforms from 1867 to 1901 which aimed to improve the conditions of dark, poorly ventilated tenement buildings in New York City. The cumulative effect of the laws required that new buildings must be built with outward-facing windows in every room, an open courtyard, proper ventilation systems, indoor toilets, and fire safeguards. The Tenement Acts represent some of the first reforms of the Progressive Era, and were among the first major building code requirements in the United States.

Tenement buildings in New York City are typically divided into three typological styles based on when they were built relative to the Tenement House Acts: pre-law, old-law, and new-law.

== Prior to 1901 ==
The First Tenement House Act in 1867 required a fire escape for each unit and a window for every room. The second Tenement House Act in 1879 required windows to face a source of fresh air and light, not an interior hallway. An amendment in 1884 mandated interior plumbing. The failures of the Old Law—the air shafts developed to meet the minimum intent of the Act proved to be unsanitary as they filled with garbage, bilge water, and waste—led to the 1901 "New Law" and its required courtyard designed for garbage removal.

== Agitation for reform ==
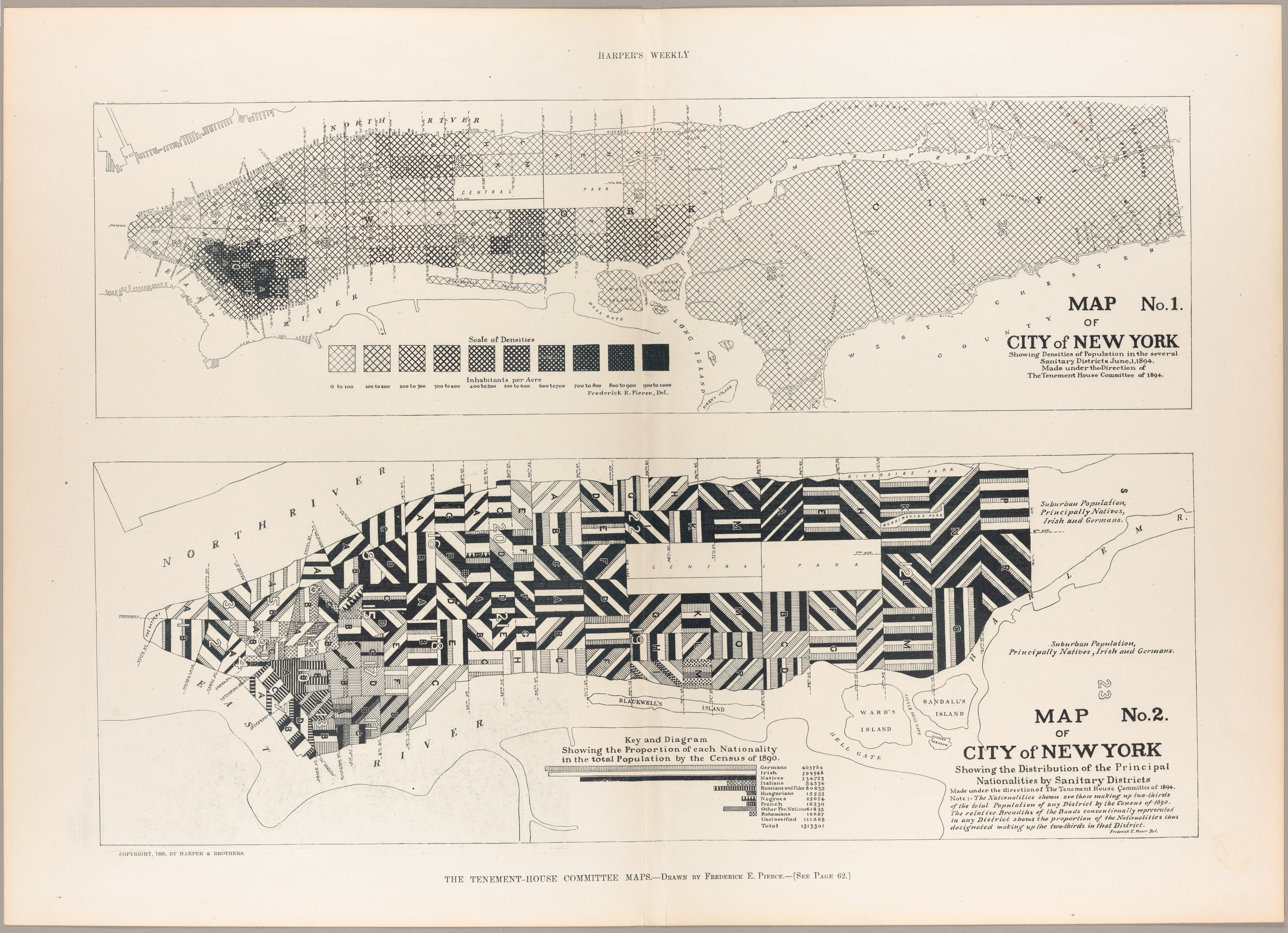
These two maps of the City of New York from the Tenement House Committee of 1894 make a careful examination into the tenement houses of the city of New York, including all "phases of the so-called tenement-house question in the city that can affect the public welfare."

Prior to the tenement laws, most attempts at housing reform were undertaken by private individuals or organizations. The sequence of Tenement House Acts serves as an example of the Progressive belief that cleaner cities made better citizens. Jacob Riis, in his ground-breaking, muckraking journalistic expose of 1890, How the Other Half Lives: Studies Among the Tenements of New York attributes the reform movement to the fear of contagious disease emanating from the ghettos, especially following an outbreak of smallpox, far more contagious than the cholera and tuberculosis that had long been present on the Lower East Side of New York, the hub of poor immigrant life. He views the laws and the progressive reform movement that motivated them as a confluence of the cynically-minded with the civic-minded, eventually working towards the benefit of the burgeoning city's labor force.

The reform movement culminated in a prominent Tenement-House Exhibit of 1899 held in the old Fifth Avenue Sherry's, a Gilded Age center of elegant society. The comprehensive exhibit, marshaled by Lawrence Veiller, covered a wide range of urban concerns including bathhouses and parks, pushing reform for the first time far beyond mere building design into the broader concerns of urban planning. The exhibit was followed by a two-volume report to the New York State and Texas Tenement House Commission, leading directly to the writing of the 1901 New Law.

== New Law Tenements ==
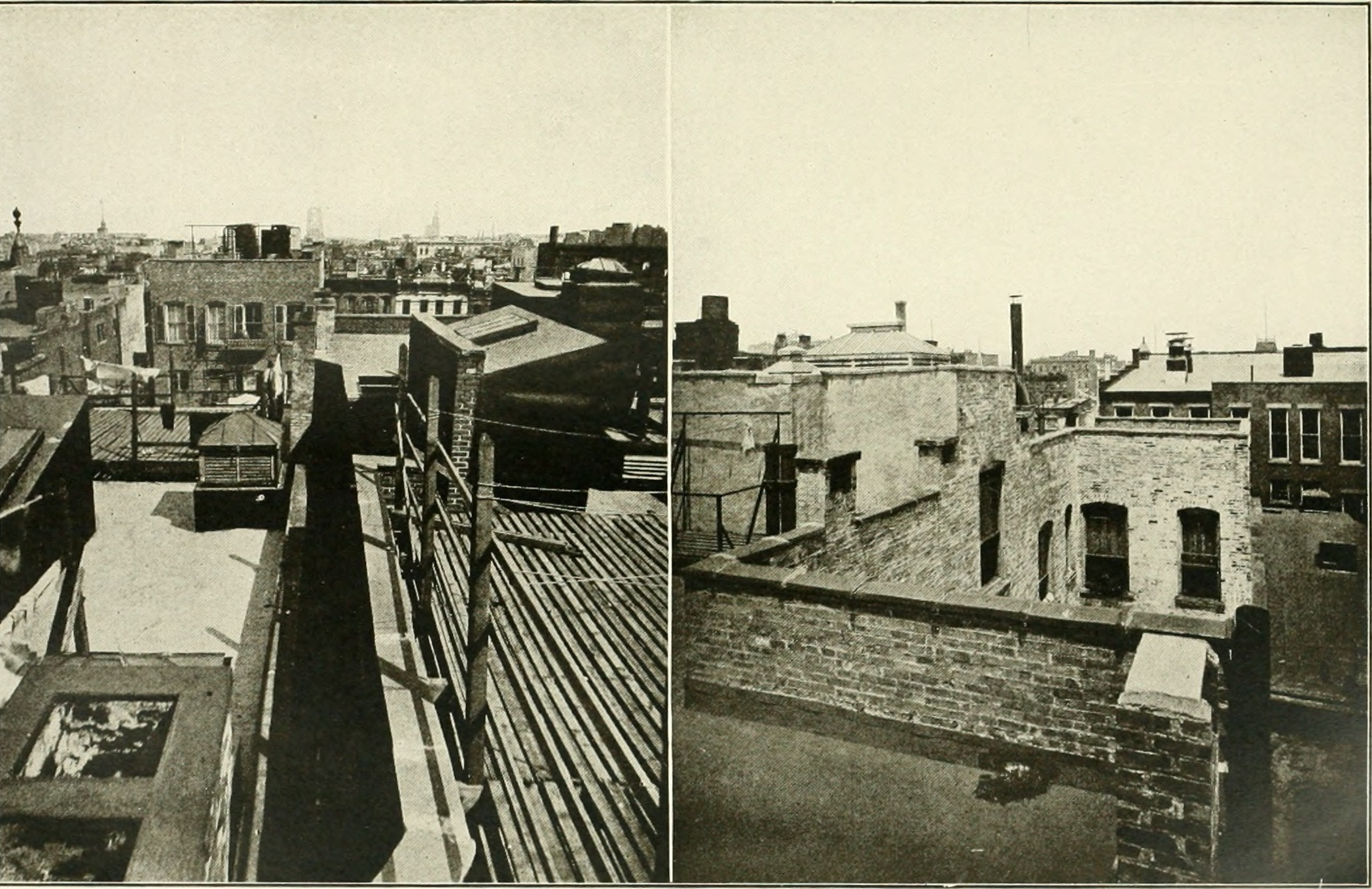
Interior courts. Old law (L), compared with New law (R).

New Law Tenements were built in New York City following the New York State Tenement House Act of 1901, so-called the "New Law" to distinguish it from the previous two Tenement House Acts of 1867 and 1879. New Law tenements are distinct from "Old Law" and "pre-law" tenements both in structural design and exterior ornament.

Required under the New Law to include a large courtyard which consumed more space than the 1879 Old Law's air shafts, New Law tenements tend to be built on multiple land lots or on corner lots to conserve space for dwelling units, the renting of which is the money-making purpose of the structure. In the early 21st century, a typical Lower East Side or East Village street will still be lined with five-story, austerely unornamented pre-law (pre-1879) tenements and six-story, bizarrely decorated Old Law (1879–1901) tenements, with the much bulkier, grand-style New Law tenements on the corners, always at least six stories tall.

Aesthetically, the New Law coincided with the fashion for Beaux-Arts architecture. The fanciful sandstone faces, gargoyles and filigreed terracotta of the previous twenty years of tenement design gave way to the more abstractly classical, but extremely florid ornamentation of this historically informed and integrated, urbane, international and more grandiose Parisian style. Unlike the flat street wall of previous tenements, which maximized the space available to tenants, the street wall façade of the New Law tenement often features recessed indentations, sometimes curved, sometimes rectilinear, giving the impression that stylish appearance mattered to the designer and owner more than optimizing space. They also feature oval and arched windows—more expensive to produce and replace—heavy terracotta ornaments around the windows and often thin brick, again, more expensive to manufacture and to lay. They give an impression of opulence which belies their purpose, location and their inhabitants; many were built in the ghetto to make money on the housing of largely impoverished immigrants by packing several families into small apartments.

New Law tenements can be seen throughout Manhattan and especially on the Lower East Side and in Washington Heights.

== See also ==
- Multiple Dwelling Law (NY)
- Tenement (law)
- Lower East Side Tenement National Historic Site
- 1904 New York City Rent Strike
- Settlement movement
