= Old Law Tenement =

1879 New York City law

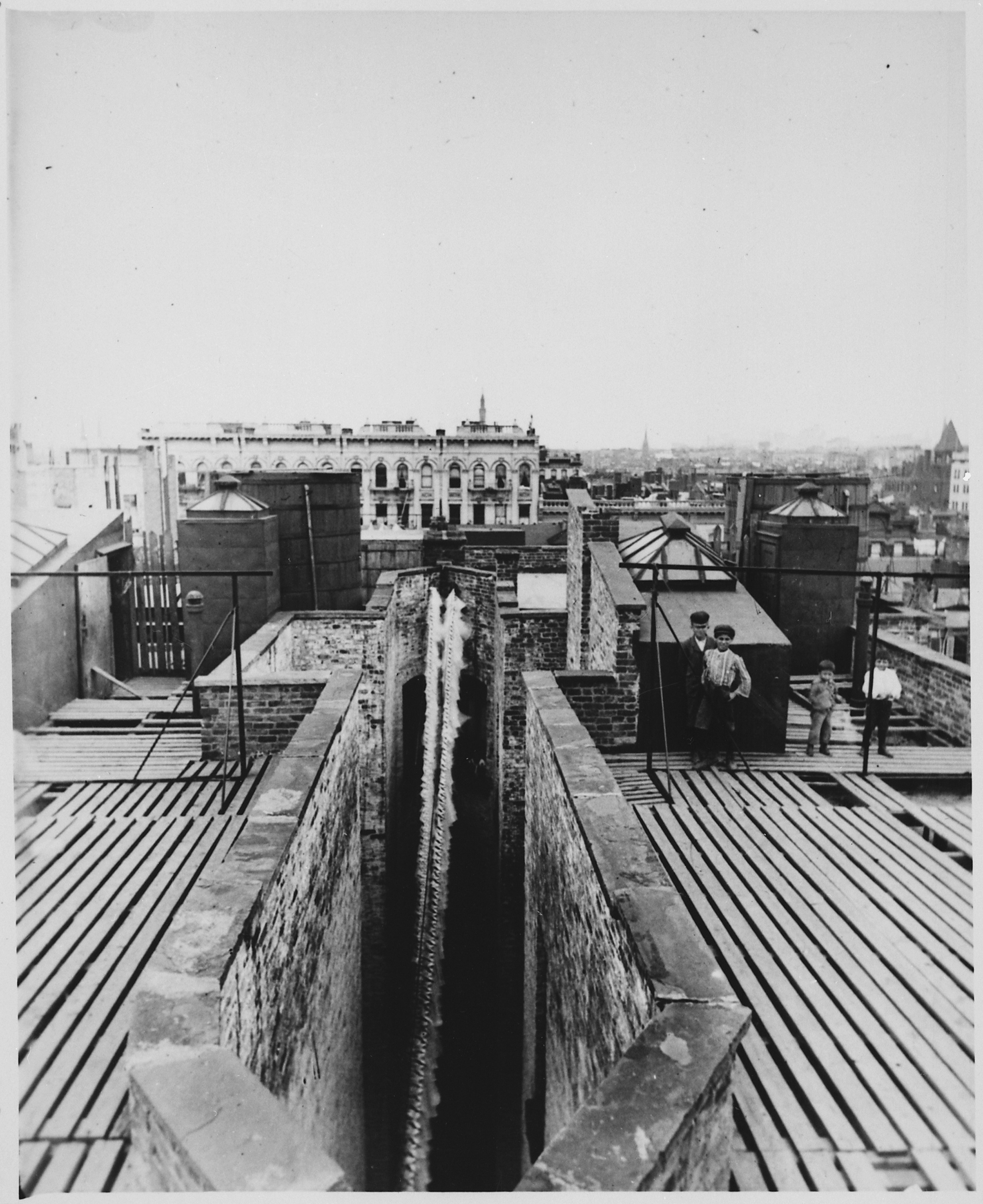
The airshaft of a dumbbell tenement, c. 1900

Old Law Tenements are tenements built in New York City after the Tenement House Act of 1879 and before the New York State Tenement House Act ("New Law") of 1901. The 1879 law required that every habitable room have a window opening to plain air, a requirement that was met by including air shafts between adjacent buildings. Old Law Tenements are commonly called "dumbbell tenements" after the shape of the building footprint: the air shaft gives each tenement the narrow-waisted shape of a dumbbell, wide facing the street and backyard, narrowed in between to create the air corridor. They were built in great numbers to accommodate waves of immigrating Europeans. The side streets of Manhattan's Lower East Side are still lined with numerous dumbbell structures today.

== History ==
The 1879 act was a response to the failure of the Tenement House Act of 1867, which required fire escapes from each suite as well as windows in each room. Builders complied with the latter part of the 1867 law by merely inserting windows between interior rooms. Without air shafts, the 1867 requirement failed to increase natural light or fresh air ventilation in the crowded tenement "dark bedrooms".

Responding to the new requirements, a magazine, Plumbing and Sanitation Engineer, held a tenement design contest in 1879. Of the 200 proposals submitted, James E. Ware's winning dumbbell design represented a compromise between legal health standards and commercial viability. By indenting the sides of the structure three feet, he opened a slender airshaft between abutting buildings. The three-foot indentation required only a minimal sacrifice of rent-revenue space, placating the landlords, and provided just enough aperture for ventilation and natural, if not direct, light.

The 1879 act, though well-intentioned, was an even worse failure than the 1867 act. Tenement dwellers tossed garbage, bilge water and waste into these air shafts, which were not designed for garbage removal, leaving the debris to rot in place. As a result, the law's attempt to improve sanitation only created a new and unintended sanitation problem of its own. Worse, the air shaft acted as a flue spreading fire from apartment to apartment. The 1901 law did away with the air shaft, replacing it with the large courtyard for garbage storage and removal. In later structures, the introduction of elevators reduced garbage defenestration by upper-story tenants.

By 1900, there were 82,000 Old Law Tenement buildings in the city, the majority in Manhattan. By 1940, more than 20% of those buildings had been abandoned, with property owners unwilling to upgrade the apartments to comply with new, more rigorous housing standards. By 1988, more than 100 years after the law's adoption, an estimated 200,000 units of Old Law Tenement apartments still existed.

== Design ==
Stylistically, Old Law Tenements are conspicuous. Though each uniformly occupies a lot 25 feet (7.6 m) in width, just like the pre-Old Law tenement, the Old Law façade – with its sandstone human and animal gargoyles (sometimes in full figure), its terracotta filigree of no apparent historical precedent, its occasional design aberrations (e.g., dwarf columns), and its often varicolored brick – departs from the plain simplicity of the largely unornamented older structures. Later in the Old Law period, the ornaments settle into a Queen Anne style, as the human representational forms gradually disappear into the more abstract extravagance of the following Beaux Arts style.

The side of an old law tenement building with a dumbbell footprint.

The symmetrical floor plan of the typical Old Law Tenement located on a 25-by-100-foot (7.6 by 30.5 m) lot included four similarly shaped apartments per floor, with either three or four rooms per unit in a railroad layout, two of which shared an interior window that allowed light to reach the inner room. A six-story structure could have 300 residents living in the building's 84 units. The entrance opened to the kitchen containing a bathtub that had a lid that could be lowered to form a working surface, alongside a sink opposite a wood-burning stove feeding into a flue. An icebox completed the appliances. Tenants usually placed a table and chairs at the angled window at the end of the narrow airshaft. Most people constructed a shelf at the kitchen window that hung out into the airshaft. During winter, food could be stored there and refrigerated without the expense of buying ice. Two toilets, cramped water closets, were located on the landing in the hallway for common use.

== See also ==
- New Law Tenement
