= Lester =

Origin
- Region of origin: England

Other names
- Variant forms: Lister, Lestre, Lessiter, Lassiter

Lester is an ancient Anglo-Saxon surname and given name.

== People ==
=== Given name ===
- Lester Bangs (1948–1982), American music critic
- Lester Oliver Bankhead (1912–1997), American architect
- Lester A. Beardslee (1836–1901), US Navy rear admiral
- Lester W. Bentley (1908–1972), American artist from Wisconsin
- Lester Ben Binion (1904–1989), American gambling icon and criminal
- Lester Bird (1938–2021), second prime minister of Antigua and Barbuda (1994–2004)
- Lester D. Boronda (1886–1953), American painter, furniture designer, sculptor
- Lester Cotton (born 1996), American football player
- Lester del Rey (1915–1993), American science fiction author and editor
- Lester Ellis (born 1965), Australian former professional boxer
- Lester Flatt (1914–1979), American bluegrass musician
- Lester Gillis (1908–1934), better known as Baby Face Nelson, American gangster
- Lester O. Gore (1890–1965), American attorney and judge
- Lester Holt (born 1959), American television journalist
- Lester Charles King (1907–1989), English geomorphologist
- Lester Lanin (1907–2004), American jazz and pop music bandleader
- Lester Lockett (1912–2005), American Negro League baseball player
- Lester Maddox (1915–2003), governor and lieutenant governor of the U.S. state of Georgia
- Lester Martínez (born 1995), Guatemalan professional boxer
- Lester Julian Merriweather (born 1978), American visual artist, collagist, painter
- Léster Morgan (1976–2002), Costa Rican footballer
- Lester Patrick (1883–1960), Canadian ice hockey player and coach
- Lester B. Pearson (1897–1972), fourteenth Prime Minister of Canada
- Lester Piggott (1935–2022), English jockey
- Lester Prosper (born 1988), Indonesian basketball player
- Lester Quiñones (born 2000), Dominican-American basketball player
- Lester Speight (born 1963), American actor, former football player and wrestler; known for his portrayal as Terry Tate, Office Linebacker
- Lester Thurow (1938–2016), American economist
- Lester Young (1909–1959), American jazz tenor saxophonist

=== Surname ===
- Adrian Lester (born 1968), British actor
- Albert Lester (c. 1803–1867), New York politician
- Alison Lester (born 1952), Australian author and illustrator
- Brad Lester (born 1985), collegiate American football player
- Gabriella Lester (born 2003), Canadian magician, escapologist and television producer
- Gavin Lester (born 1977), Australian rugby league footballer
- Holly Lester, disc jockey from Northern Ireland
- Jack Lester (born 1975), English football (soccer) player
- Jenna Lester (born 1989), American dermatologist
- Jim Lester (British politician) (1932–2021), British politician
- John Lester (1871–1969), American cricketer
- Jon Lester (born 1984), American baseball player
- Josh Lester (born 1994), American baseball player
- Julia Lester (soccer) (born 1998), American professional soccer player
- Julia Lester (born 2000), American actress
- Julius Lester (1939–2018), American writer
- Lashonda Lester (1975–2017), American stand-up comedian
- Luke Fleet Lester, American engineer
- Mark L. Lester (born 1946), American film producer
- Mary Louise Lester (1919–1977), All-American Girls Professional Baseball League player
- Marsha I. Lester, American physical chemist
- Paul Lester, British music journalist
- Paul Martin Lester (1953–2023), American communications professor and author
- Peter Lester (disambiguation)
  - Peter Lester (abolitionist), American-born 19th-century businessman and abolitionist
  - Peter Lester (sailor), New Zealand sailor and broadcaster
- Phil Lester (born 1987), British YouTuber and BBC Radio 1 presenter
- Robert "Squirrel" Lester (1942–2010), American singer, original member of the vocal group The Chi-Lites
- Robie Lester (1925–2005), American actress
- Richard A. Lester (1908–1997), American economist
- Richard Lester (born 1932), British film director
- Richard Neville Lester (1937–2006), British botanist
- Ryan Lester (born 1992), Australian rules footballer
- Seán Lester (1880–1959), Irish diplomat
- Sonny Lester (1924–2018), American record producer
- Tom Lester (1938–2020), American actor
- Tom Lester (American football) (1927–2012), American football coach
- Vicki Lester (1915–2001), American actress
- William "Buddy" Lester (1915–2002), American actor and comedian
- Yami Lester (1941–2017), Australian Indigenous rights advocate

=== Fictional characters ===
- Lester, a goose in Chris Colfer's The Land of Stories
- Lester "Les" Awesome, is the leader, and the shortest of the team. He is the only one in his family who does not have a trophy until he was rewarded for saving someone's life, In Rated A for Awesome
- Lester Burnham, the main character in the film American Beauty
- Lester Crest, from the video game Grand Theft Auto V
- Lester Freamon, from the television show The Wire
- Lester Krinklesac, from the television show The Cleveland Show
- James Peregrine Lester, from the television series Primeval
- Lester Nessman from the television show WKRP in Cincinnati
- Lester Nygaard, from the television series Fargo
- Lester Papadopoulos, the human name of the god Apollo, from the book series Trials of Apollo by Rick Riordan
- Lester Patel, from the television series Chuck
- Lester Sludge, from the television show M.A.S.K.

== See also ==
=== Middle name ===
- H. Lester Hooker (1921–1999), American college basketball and baseball coach
- Leicester, a city in England pronounced the same way as "Lester"
