= Louise Leonard McLaren =

American educator

Louise Leonard McLaren (August 10, 1885 – December 16, 1968) born in Wellsboro, Pennsylvania, was founder of the Southern Summer School for Women Workers.

== Early career ==
She attended Miss Beret's School for Ladies in Harrisburg, Pennsylvania and went on to earn her A.B. at Vassar College in 1907; She then taught history until 1914 when she became the YWCA industrial secretary in Wilkes Barre, Pennsylvania. In this capacity she traveled through the south in order to organize women workers in industry. After earning an A.M. in economics at Columbia University in 1927 she decided to organize the Southern Summer School for Women Workers. Leonard recruited a faculty from women's colleges. It was modeled on the Bryn Mawr Summer School for Women Workers in Industry originated by Hilda Worthington Smith. She viewed workers' education as a means for social change. Writing in Vassar Quarterly about her work she commented, "these awakening workers of the South have a chance to get worker's education, as they demand social and economic enfranchisement."

== To the South ==
The first Southern Summer School met at rented facilities in 1927 at Sweet Briar College in Virginia. It never had permanent quarters, and moved each year. The 25 students each year were carefully chosen and all white, but the philosophy that Louise espoused made no difference between faculty and student, emphasizing "there is no line drawn between faculty and student as there is in academic life." The students were chosen to represent all the typical industries of the south and Leonard was intent on teaching the "social attitudes appropriate to the machine age". In 1930 Louise Leonard married Myron McLaren, a professor at St.Johns college in Maryland. When he lost his job during the depression she supported them both. The couple was childless and she devoted herself to the work, under her charge more than 300 working-class women came to summer residence, being trained as leaders in their fields. In 1938 men were included in the residence program and by 1940 half of the students were men. She had the support of the labor unions and had a commitment to the tenets of workers' education.

== Later career ==
In 1944 Louise McLaren moved to New York City where she served as organizer for the Congress of Industrial Organizations Political Action committee. She held various positions eventually retiring from a teaching and research position with the American Labor Education Service. She was part of a network of reform-minded women that met in the 1920s and later became academic social scientists (including Marie Algor, Hilda (Jane) Smith, Mary C. Barker, Ernestine Friedmann, Alice Shoemaker, Amy Bruce, and Eleanor G. Coit). Some were former YWCA industrial and executive secretaries whom went on to establish summer schools, taught workers' education programs, did research and field work, and also held seminars and conferences for workers' education. Throughout the years of cooperative work in the field they managed to stay in touch and this resulted in lasting friendships.

She died in East Stroudsburg, Pa. in 1968 of heart disease at age 83. She had a vision of industrial society and with an unfailing sense of optimism and with hard work and dedication inspired several generations of southern working women.

== See also ==
- Miss Dana's School for Young Ladies
- New Labor Forum
- Workers' Education Bureau of America
- Hilda Worthington Smith
- M. Carey Thomas
