= Bryn Mawr Summer School for Women Workers in Industry =

Former residential summer school program in Pennsylvania, USA

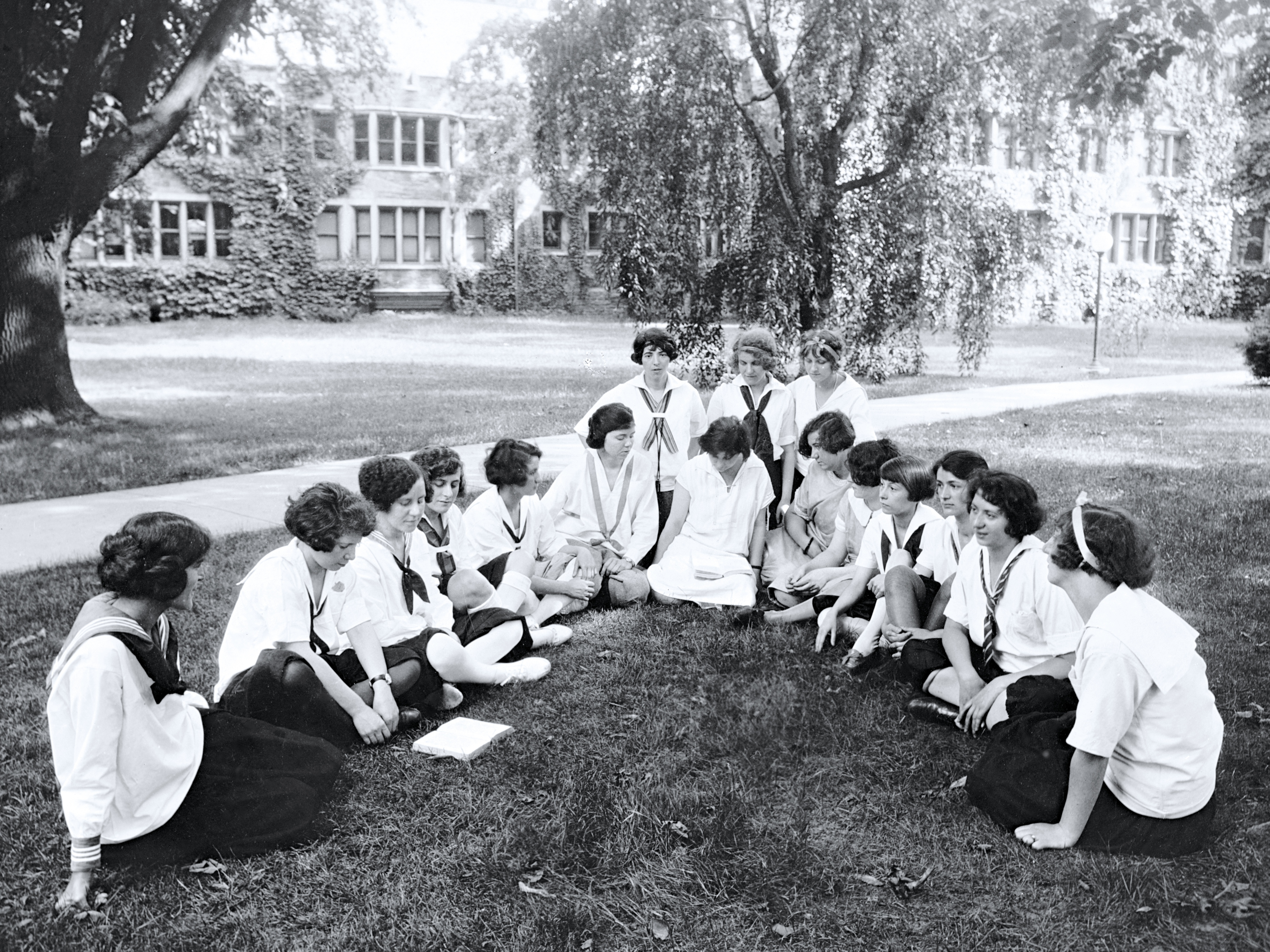
- Students at the Bryn Mawr Summer School for Women Workers in Industry, ca. 1921

- Location within Pennsylvania Location within Philadelphia
- 40.02405°N 75.31397°W

Pennsylvania Historical Marker
- Official name: Bryn Mawr Summer School for Women Workers in Industry
- Type: Roadside
- Designated: October 13, 2001
- Location: Bryn Mawr Campus, Morris Ave. at Yarrow St., Bryn Mawr

The Bryn Mawr Summer School for Women Workers in Industry (1921–1938) was a residential summer school program that brought approximately 100 young working women—mostly factory workers with minimal education—to the Bryn Mawr College campus, in Bryn Mawr, Pennsylvania, each year for eight weeks of liberal arts study. As part of the workers' education movement of the 1920s and 30s, the experimental program was unique in several ways. It was the first program of its kind for women in the United States; it was conceived, directed, and largely taught by women; and it was hosted by a women's college.

Originally the brainchild of Bryn Mawr president M. Carey Thomas, the program was funded by philanthropists such as John D. Rockefeller Jr. and taught by distinguished faculty drawn from local institutions. Under the direction of Hilda Worthington Smith it evolved into a successful workers' education program that served as the model for several others. Many of the students, who came from diverse ethnic and religious backgrounds and worked in a variety of industries, went on to become union leaders. For political reasons, the program fell out of favor with the college board of trustees and was terminated in 1938.

The school is the subject of a 1985 documentary by Suzanne Bauman and Rita Heller, The Women of Summer.

== History ==
=== Founding ===
Bryn Mawr College President M. Carey Thomas conceived the idea for the school some time after visiting Workers' Educational Association (WEA) programs in England. According to Thomas, the inspiration came to her in the form of a vision while she was traveling in the Sahara Desert in 1919:

One afternoon at sunset I was sitting on my golden hilltop, rejoicing that British women had just been enfranchised and American women would soon be politically free ... when suddenly, as in a vision, I saw that out of the hideous world war might come as a glorious aftermath international industrial justice and international peace...I also saw as part of my vision that the coming of equal opportunity for the manual workers of the world might be hastened by utilizing the deep sex sympathy that women now feel for each other before it has had time to grow less.

In the fall of 1920, Thomas consulted with Dean Hilda Worthington Smith and Professor Susan M. Kingsbury about starting a summer school for working women. The planning committee also included labor leaders such as Mary Anderson from the U.S. Women's Bureau, Fannia Cohn from the International Ladies' Garment Workers' Union, and Rose Schneiderman (of "Bread and Roses" fame) from the Women's Trade Union League. The school's aim, as described in a 1929 recruiting pamphlet, was:

To offer young women in industry opportunities to study liberal subjects and to train themselves in clear thinking; to stimulate an active and continued interest in the problems of our economic order; to develop a desire for study as a means of understanding and of enjoyment of life. The school is not committed to any theory or dogma. It is expected that thus the students will gain a truer insight into the problems of industry and feel a more vital responsibility for their solution.

The school welcomed its first 82 students on June 15, 1921. To be eligible, students had to be between 20 and 35; have worked for at least three years, with two of those years in industry; have at least a sixth-grade education; be able to read and write English; and work "with the tools of their trade", not as supervisors or in white-collar jobs.

=== Administration ===
Hilda Worthington Smith directed the summer school for thirteen years, and is credited with developing it into the successful program that it became. The school was governed by a Joint Administrative Committee composed equally of industry women (such as Rose Schneiderman, who served on the committee for three years) and women of Bryn Mawr (faculty, administrators, and alumni). The School Council, which met once a week to plan school activities, consisted of seven students, three administrators, and three faculty. Regional committees, also composed equally of industry and Bryn Mawr women, were tasked with recruiting and fundraising. Funding was provided by a diverse group of supporters that included John D. Rockefeller Jr. and the Amalgamated Clothing Workers of America.

The 90 faculty who taught at the school between 1921 and 1938 included trade union leaders as well as distinguished academics. The majority were women.

=== Philosophy and curriculum ===
In their overall approach, Thomas and Smith drew on the example of the WEA programs and the educational philosophy of John Dewey, with a strong emphasis on diversity and democratic process. They intentionally brought together representatives of widely disparate constituencies: trade union leaders and privileged Bryn Mawr alumni; mill workers who had left school at the age of 12 and university professors; union and non-union workers from a variety of industries across the U.S.; native-born Americans and immigrants from Russia, Italy, and Eastern Europe; Protestants, Catholics, and Jews. "We are learning toleration," one student said in an interview with the Woman's Journal. Another remarked that "to her the summer work, the mingling with the representatives of many industries, of many localities, of many points of view, had brought home the conviction that the problem of each working woman was the problem of all, the problem of all that of each."

Initially the program of study was extensive, and workers with little formal education were overwhelmed. Over time, with input from the students, the curriculum evolved to become more focused on their practical needs. By 1928, they were using the "Unit Method": Classes were divided into units of around 20 students; each unit had two dedicated full-time professors, one in English and one in economics. A 1929 pamphlet describes the Plan of Teaching as: "Small classes in Economics, English Literature, Composition, Public Speaking, Science and Psychology. A tutoring system making it possible for workers to gain much in two months."

There were no grades or exams; students received a certificate of attendance at the end of the summer. As working adults, students were encouraged to participate in decision-making, planning, and classroom discussions. Instructors made a point of learning as much as they could about each student's background and individual needs.

In addition to regular classes, students attended talks by an impressive array of guest lecturers, including John Dewey, W.E.B. Du Bois, Harold Laski, Frances Perkins, Walter Reuther, Eleanor Roosevelt, Margaret Sanger, and Norman Thomas. They went on field trips to local museums, historical sites, and factories, and took tennis and swimming lessons. They held an annual folk music festival featuring music from the students' various homelands, and published a student magazine, Shop and School, featuring prose, poetry, humor, and drama. When John Dewey visited the school in 1931, he saw it as "a model of progressive education and experiential learning."

=== Racial integration ===
In 1926, at the suggestion of the students, Hilda Worthington Smith admitted the first five African-American students to the summer school. The decision was a controversial one, given that the college had never admitted a black student. M. Carey Thomas warned Smith in a letter not to "complicate" matters, and quoted her late friend Susan B. Anthony: "Do not mix reforms, but drive straight through to your goal looking neither to the right nor to the left." Smith continued to admit black students despite Thomas's misgivings.

=== Final years ===
From the very first year, the working women who came to Bryn Mawr gave school administrators more than they bargained for. In 1921 they organized a student protest, demanding better working conditions for the college's black maids and groundskeepers. In the 1930s, the Depression heightened class tensions between the politically active students and Bryn Mawr's wealthy donors and trustees. One trustee posed the telling question, "Why should we support your organizing workers to strike our husbands' plants?"

In 1934, when students and faculty visited the nearby Seabrook Farms food-packing plant to observe a strike of agricultural workers, the Philadelphia Inquirer reported that Bryn Mawr was involved in the strike. Alarmed by the publicity, the trustees suspended the summer school for a year. It reopened in 1936, but the damage had been done; funding dwindled, and the Bryn Mawr Summer School for Women Workers in Industry closed for good in 1938.

=== Influence ===
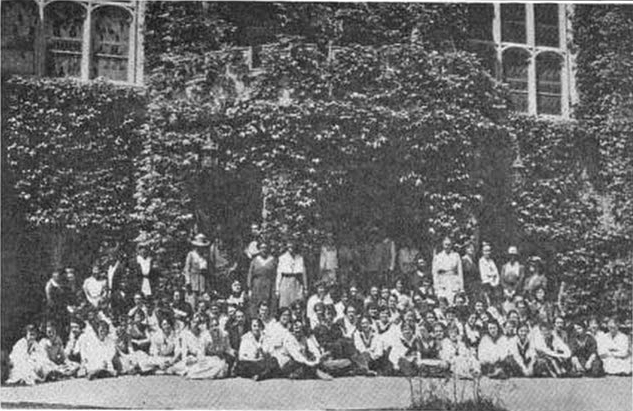
Students and faculty of the Bryn Mawr Summer School for Women Workers in Industry, 1921

Historian Rita Heller, who conducted a survey of the students in 1982, found that while some of the respondents were ambivalent about the program's usefulness, most credited it with improving their self-image and social skills and believed the school had helped them advance in their careers. Many went on to take leadership positions in their communities, churches, and trade unions. Elizabeth Nord became chairman of the New England Silk and Rayon Workers Union; Carmen Lucia became vice president of the United Hatters, Cap and Millinery Workers International Union; and Rose Finkelstein Norwood led the Boston chapter of the Women's Trade Union League.

The school served as a model for several other workers' education programs, including the Wisconsin Summer School, Barnard Summer School, Vineyard Shore School, Southern Summer School, and the coeducational Hudson Shore Labor School.

Summer school alumni and faculty gathered at Bryn Mawr for a three-day reunion in June 1984. Several women at the reunion were featured in a 1985 documentary, The Women of Summer, a collaboration of filmmaker Suzanne Bauman and historian Rita Heller. The film was funded by the National Endowment for the Humanities and has won several awards, including the American Film Festival's Red Ribbon and the CINE Golden Eagle.

== Notable faculty ==
The following notable people were on the summer school faculty.

- Elizabeth Brandeis, economist
- Millicent Carey, educator and feminist
- Alice Hanson Cook, scholar and feminist
- Grace Coyle, sociologist
- Mary Florence Curran, artist and social reformer
- Ida Craven, economist
- Marion Dickerman, educator and suffragist
- Paul Douglas, politician and economist
- Eleanor Lansing Dulles, economist, author
- Edward M. Earle, historian
- Genevieve Fox, author
- Winifred Frost, biologist
- Alice Henry, labor leader
- Lillian Herstein, labor leader
- Amy Hewes, sociologist and economist
- Leo Huberman, socialist writer
- Hazel Kyrk, economist
- Mildred H. McAfee, educator
- Broadus Mitchell, historian
- Helen Muchnic, scholar
- Gladys Palmer, economist
- Esther Peterson, consumer and women's advocate
- Katherine Pollak Ellickson, labor economist
- Mark Starr, labor historian
- Mary van Kleeck, scholar of women's labor
- Caroline F. Ware, historian and activist
- Colston Warne, economist and consumer advocate
- Theresa Wolfson, labor economist

== Sources ==
- Ard, Anne K. (1992). Powerful Learning: A Study of the Bryn Mawr Summer School for Women Workers in Industry 1921–1938. Association for the Study of Higher Education.
- Frederickson, Mary (2007). "Bryn Mawr Summer School for Women Workers in Industry". In Arnesen, Eric (ed.). Encyclopedia of U.S. Labor and Working-class History, Volume 1. Taylor & Francis. pp. 193–194. ISBN 9780415968263.
- Hollis, Karyn (1994). "Liberating Voices: Autobiographical Writing at the Bryn Mawr Summer School for Women Workers, 1921–1938". College Composition and Communication. 45 (1): 31–60. doi:10.2307/358586. JSTOR 358586.
- McGuire, John (2009). "Maintaining the Vitality of a Social Movement: Social Justice Feminism, Class Conflict, and the Bryn Mawr Summer School for Women Workers, 1921–1924". Pennsylvania History: A Journal of Mid-Atlantic Studies. 76 (4): 393–421. doi:10.2307/27778923. JSTOR 27778923.
- O'Hagan, Anne (August 13, 1921). "An Adventure in Education: The Summer School for Women Workers at Bryn Mawr". The Woman's Journal. 6: 9–10.
- Smith, Hilda Worthington (1929). Women Workers at the Bryn Mawr Summer School. New York: Affiliated Summer Schools for Women Workers in Industry. OL 23361138M.
- Bauman, Suzanne; Heller, Rita (1985). "The Women of Summer". Filmakers Library, Inc.
- "Reunion at Bryn Mawr: Workers of 30's Return". The New York Times. June 24, 1984.
- "Bryn Mawr Summer School Pamphlet" (PDF). Emory University. 1929. Archived from the original (PDF) on 2016-02-22.
- "Bryn Mawr Summer School for Women Workers in Industry Historical Marker". Explore PA History.
