= Women United for United Nations =

Women United for United Nations (WUUN) was an organisation established in January 1947 that worked to increase public awareness of and interest in the relatively newly formed United Nations (U.N.).

WUUN was formed, according to Harvard Library, by 30 representatives of women's organisations which had UN accreditation. Rose P. Parsons was a founder and also acted as WUUN's chairperson.

WUUN acted as a self-appointed public relations agency for the U.N., publishing a monthly U.N. News for Women Broadcasters bulletin, promoting U.N stories to the press and also producing catalogs of U.N. themed documentary films. The organisation established an Information Center for the U.N. in New York in conjunction with the American Association for the United Nations. WUUN also worked at the community level by organising discussions, providing speakers for local events, and producing educational resources. WUUN is seen as an instrumental part of the founding of the United Nations International Children's Emergency Relief Fund, gaining acceptance for the project and using its network to raise funds by putting up greeting cards for sale.

In 1951, WUUN issued a report opposed to a Women's International Democratic Federation report, "We Accuse," which described the bombing raids carried out by the United States Air Force and war crimes committed by the United Nations Forces in the Korean War. The United States Department of State widely disseminated WUUN's critique through Radio Free Asia and Radio Free Europe. WUUN sent their report to women's organizations and major newspapers such as The New York Times and The Washington Post.

Suzy Kim, Professor of Korean History at Rutgers University, suggests that the "30 US women's groups that formed the Women United for United Nations (WUUN) waged a 'patriotic' defense of 'collective security,' standing against pacifist and peace groups that campaigned against war and armament," and places WUUN in the context of groups such as the (CIA-funded) Committee of Correspondence, which was established, according to Professor Helen Laville, as "a direct response to the Soviet peace campaign and the activities of the WIDF".

The WUUN archive is held at the Schlesinger Library on the History of Women in America.

== See also ==
- Liberal internationalism
