= Ernestine Friedmann =

American economist (1884–1973)

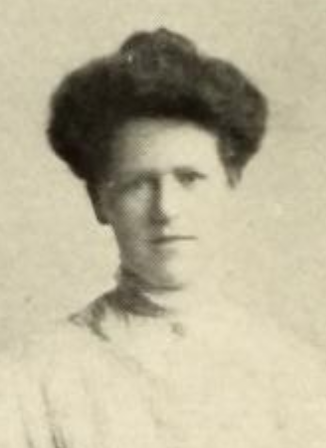
- Ernestine L. Friedmann, from the 1907 yearbook of Smith College
- Born: September 11, 1884; Brooklyn, New York
- Died: September 1973 (aged approximately 79); Maryland
- Occupation(s): Economist, educator

Ernestine Louise Friedmann (September 11, 1884 – September 1973) was an American economist and educator. She was a professor of economics and taught at the Barnard and Bryn Mawr Summer School for Women Workers.

== Early life and education ==
Friedmann was born in Brooklyn, New York, the daughter of John Friedmann and Josephine Henrietta Heil Friedmann, who were both born in New York. She graduated from Smith College in 1907, and earned a master's degree from Columbia University in 1916; she completed doctoral studies in economics at Columbia in 1926, with a dissertation titled "A Study of the Workers' Education Movement in the United States."

== Career ==
Friedmann was a professor of economics and the head of the economics departments at Rockford College and Wheaton College in Illinois. She wrote about the cooperative movement, about women in industrial work, and about minimum wage and cost of living, asking "Shall we continue to safeguard the system and to establish a minimum wage that creates a standard of living that permanently enslaves the wage earning class? Or shall we chart what we consider the standards of 'an abundant life' and work to establish that order of society that will make them possible to all of us alike?" in a 1922 essay for The World Tomorrow.

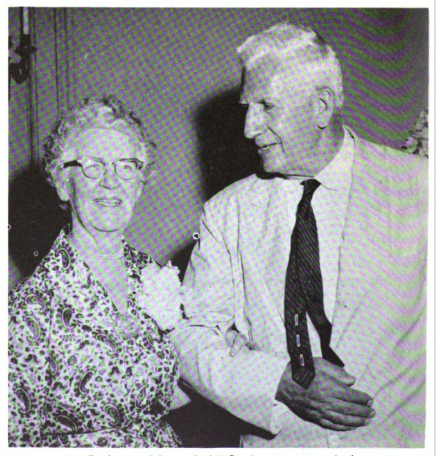
Ernestine Friedmann with Senator Paul Douglas at reception in honor of her retirement

During World War I, Friedmann was active in the national leadership of the YWCA, and wrote several booklets in that work. She directed the Barnard College Summer School for Women Workers and the Bryn Mawr Summer School for Women Workers. She worked with Hilda Worthington Smith in the 1930s, on adult education programs. "The principle of democracy underlies every step in workers' classes, emphasizing the learning process rather than the teaching process," they explained in 1937. With the Federal Emergency Relief Administration, she taught adults across the United States. Charlotte Wilder dedicated her poetry collection Phases of the Moon (1939) to Friedmann and novelist Evelyn Scott.

Friedmann was a member of the National Women's Trade Union League and the American League for Peace and Democracy. She joined the staff of the Washington International Center when it opened in 1950 and retired from that work on July 1, 1962.

== Personal life ==
Friedman died in 1973, aged 89 years, in Maryland.
