= Mary Curran =

Mary Curran may refer to:

- Mary Doyle Curran (1917–1981), American poet, novelist, and teacher
- Mary Florence Curran (1885–1976), American artist, gallerist, and social reform worker
