= Caroline F. Ware =

American historian

Caroline Farrar Ware (1899–1990) was a professor of history and a New Deal activist. Her work focused on community development, consumer protection, industrial development, civil rights, and women's issues.

== Biography ==
=== Family and early years ===
Caroline "Lina" Ware was born and raised in Brookline, Massachusetts. Her family belonged to the New England Unitarian church, and had a history of social concern. Ware's great-great-grandfather, Henry Ware, dean of the Harvard Divinity School, controversially established Unitarianism in the institution. Ware's great-grandfather, Henry Ware Jr., also a faculty member of the Harvard Divinity School, published unorthodox ideas and was also deemed a controversial figure. Her grandfather was Charles Pickard Ware. During the American Civil War, he worked in Port Royal, South Carolina, with some of the first newly freed people to be liberated by the Union Army. Caroline's father, brother, and various cousins were all graduates of Harvard College. Caroline's father, also named Henry Ware, was a municipal judge, lawyer, and member of the Brookline town meeting. Her mother was involved in community service, such as volunteering with the Girl Scouts and the church. Her family strongly advocated for the education of women.

=== Adolescence ===
Ware attended local private schools, before choosing to enroll in Vassar College over Bryn Mawr College. At Vassar, Ware became a student of Lucy Maynard Salmon, a professor of history. Salmon emphasized the importance of observing ordinary people's lives and thinking independently. She taught Ware how to carry out careful research methodology, and encouraged her to use primary sources. Several of Vassar's faculty at the time taught that knowledge was the foundation of "responsible conduct".

=== Early teaching career and postgraduate studies ===
Ware received her A.B. from Vassar College in Poughkeepsie in 1920, her A.M. from Radcliffe College, a women's college associated with Harvard University in 1924, and her Ph.D. in 1925. Ware was an associate professor of history at Vassar from 1925 to 1930, and from 1932 to 1934. After graduating from Vassar College with an A.B. (artium baccalaureus), Ware taught summer school in the state of Kentucky's mountains. At the age of eighty-four, Ware reflected that her first trip to the south was the first time she had encountered segregation. In the fall, Ware began teaching at a preparatory school for girls in Pennsylvania, the Baldwin School. The school was founded in 1881, with the purpose of preparing young women for admission into Bryn Mawr College.

In the summer of 1921, Ware became a teacher at the Bryn Mawr Summer School for Women Workers. One of the school's main founders was Hilda Worthington Smith, a labor educator who believed female workers required a broader education than only vocational training. Smith became a lifelong friend of Ware, and influenced Ware's pedagogy. As a teacher, Ware provided the workers with a liberal arts education, many of whom had left school after the sixth grade. Following her experience at the Bryn Mawr Summer School, Ware continued to teach worker education classes throughout her life.

Ware resumed her teaching position at the Baldwin School in 1922 (Scott, p. 3). During this year, she was awarded a Vassar scholarship to continue her studies at Oxford University. This was an uncommon opportunity for a woman at this time. After one year at Oxford, her studies were cut short, in order to return home to her sick mother. While in Massachusetts, Ware decided to pursue a Ph.D. in economic history, and enrolled at Radcliffe College. As a graduate student, Ware worked with Harvard faculty, including Edwin Gay, who informed her about unexamined records in the Harvard Business School. The records were of early experiments in cotton cloth factories, which became the primary documents of her dissertation.

In 1929, Ware was awarded the Hart-Schaffner-Marx Prize for her dissertation, an award for scholarship in the areas of economics and commerce. Two years later, Houghton-Mifflin published her dissertation, titled The Early New England Cotton Manufacture: A Study in Industrial Beginnings. After she received her Ph.D. in 1925, the only job Ware found that was satisfactory was a teaching position at Vassar College. She excelled in this position and was considered a masterful teacher. Ware held her teaching position at Vassar from 1925 to 1934.

Ware moved to New York in 1931, in order to join her husband, Gardiner Means, who was completing his dissertation at Columbia University. During this time, Ware worked on a community study of Greenwich Village. She published her research in a groundbreaking book titled Greenwich Village.

=== New Deal ===
When Gardiner Means was offered a position in the Department of Agriculture in 1933 to work on consumer and economic problems, Ware increasingly spent time in Washington D.C. Ware left her teaching position at Vassar and joined her husband at the Department of Agriculture. Ware became involved in President Roosevelt's New Deal, specifically creating a new field called "consumer affairs." The previous definition of "consumer" had been termed at the beginning of the 20th century by Florence Kelley, and was used to explain that consumers had the power to improve the situation of poor by boycotting goods that were created at the expense of the well-being of workers. The New Deal expanded this idea with the concept that consumers were also in need of protection from neglect or greed by local government. New Deal agencies were meant to equally represent consumers, labor and business. During World War II the focus of consumer affairs was on the needs of workers in war industries; these needs included adequate housing, childcare, education, and the end of race-based discrimination for war industry jobs.

Ware became involved in several New Deal agencies that dealt with consumer protection problems, and often faced opposition from labor and business representative and bureaucrats. She learned how to effect change in Washington D.C from the perspective of a bureaucrat and lobbyist, which became useful knowledge in her later work as an activist and historian. Ware learned that individuals could exercise a significant amount of power if they were more knowledgeable about the subject than anyone else. She noted that government contracts and grants caused a fragmentation of responsibility (Scott, p. 8). Ware worked as a specialist for different agencies until the early 1940s, when the focus of the government shifted toward the war.

=== Later career ===
In 1939, Ware was asked to organize a series of papers to be presented at the American Historical Association's annual meeting. This request was unusual for a woman to receive, as women scholars were often under-appreciated during this time period. Despite the obstacles of finding a teaching position as a woman, Ware taught at Sarah Lawrence College from 1935 to 1937, and at American University graduate school from 1936 to 1945. While she was teaching, Ware continued to hold advocacy positions in various government agencies. She regularly testified about consumer protection issues at congressional hearings (Scott, p. 10). President Roosevelt appointed Ware to be deputy to Harriet Elliott, the consumer representative of a National Defense Advisory Commission. Elliot and Ware had worked together in the American Association of University Women. Ware faced gender discrimination in this position, as the members of the commission had condescending attitudes towards consumers and towards female commissioners. Ware was forbidden from using the Executive Dining Rom, and was excluded from policy discussion. Despite these obstacles, Ware continued to gain responsibility. She oversaw food supply, housing, and medical care in neighborhoods where war production took place.

After resigning from her position in the National Defense Advisory Commission, Ware joined the Office of Price Administration consumer advisory group. She remained involved in various advisory groups until the Eisenhower distanced itself from consumer protection in 1952. In the early 1940s, Ware began teaching constitutional history full-time at Howard University, where she stayed until 1961. Ware was invited to lecture on community development in 1947 in Puerto Rico. This invitation led her to become an advisor for women's groups in Central and South America. Ware learned the Spanish language in order to lecture and to write a guidebook on community development. Her publication became a bestselling guidebook for the Pan American Union.

Ware taught social science at Sarah Lawrence College from 1935 to 1937, and was an associate professor at American University from 1936 to 1940. In 1936 she published with her husband The Modern Economy in Action. Furthermore, she was a lecturer at the American University School of Social Sciences and Public Affairs from 1940 to 1954, and a professor at the Howard University School of Social Work from 1945 to 1961. Ware was a member of the American Association of University Women and from 1939 to 1945, served on the Association's Committee on Social Studies. She worked with the Association to establish a consumer agency in the federal government.

Ware edited the influential book The Cultural Approach to History (1940), which featured distinguished historians such as Merle Curti, Ray Allen Billington, Constance Green and Ralph Gabriel. The cultural approach involved shifting the focus of historical analysis away from institutions and elites toward social realities among Americans, placing heavy emphasis on social and economic context and explicitly recognizing the diminishing roles of individuals in the modern industrial world. It also stressed the interdependence of social, economic, and cultural forces.

In 1963, President John F. Kennedy selected Caroline Ware to be a member of the President's Commission on the Status of Women.

== Personal life ==
=== Marriage ===
In 1927, a nearly illiterate town clerk married Ware and Means. Caroline Ware met Gardiner Means while she was a graduate student at Radcliffe College. They lived in the same apartment building. Means and Ware shared a common interest in studying factories. Means, who was four years older than Ware, had been a pilot in World War I. Ware and Means were both analytical thinkers, and collaborated in their research. Together they wrote The Modern Economy in Action.

Ware and her husband bought seventy acres of land in the rural community of Vienna, located in northern Virginia. The property was purchased in 1936 for $7000. "The Farm" housed various friends and acquaintances of the couple, including students, government workers, writers, professionals, travelers on international missions, and humanitarians. On numerous occasions Ware housed young people who needed mentorship or housing. Caroline Ware's friend, Pauli Murray describes her time at the Farm:

Gardiner and Lina combined their intellectual pursuits with rugged outdoor life... A visitor was free to disappear with a book [...] or to join in the physical chores as a FIBUL (Skipper's acronym for "Free Intelligent But Unskilled Labor") painting the barn, cutting and stacking wood, pulling up weeds.

Ware and Means later donated the seventy acres of land as a public park. They later purchased Yellowhead Island, an island off the coast of Maine. They sought to preserve the natural landscape, and searched for solutions through which local fishermen could earn higher wages.

== Works ==
The Early New England Cotton Manufacture: A Study in Industrial Beginnings, published in 1929 by Houghton-Mifflin, was based on the dissertation Ware wrote at Radcliffe College. The book was reviewed in several publications, including The New York Times, The Nation, and The American Economic Review. In her book, Ware argued that the early cotton mill industry in New England transformed rural life, particularly for women, and influenced the future industrial development in the United States:

The class alignment and the power of the capitalist brought new problems to the American democracy. Could political democracy encompass industrial autocracy, could it harbor a working class and a moneyed power and survive? ...These problems which New England faced before 1860 have confronted other American communities as one by one they have experienced the process of industrialization.

Ware thought that the social consequences the changes brought about by industrialization were not yet fully understood by historians. She addressed the work culture of industrial mills, and its effect on women. These topics were, at the time, unaddressed by historians.

Greenwich Village was written in the early 1930s, and dealt with the Irish, Italian, Spanish, and Jewish populations in the area, rather than the bohemian writers and artists that the area was famous for. Ware described the social structure of the multiracial, multiethnic neighborhood. The book is an early example of a new type of social history in which the lives of previously invisible people was documented.

The Cultural Approach to History was a collection of papers Ware organized to present at the American History Association's annual meeting. Ware's introductory essay discussed "the problem of objectivity," which refers to the unconscious biases historians have. Ware called on historians to recognize these biases and to recognize that these biases affect the premises in their writings.

History of the Scientific and Cultural Development of Mankind was a six-volume book Ware wrote for the United Nations' Educational, Scientific, and Cultural Organization.

The Modern Economy in Action was a collaboration between Ware and her husband, Gardiner Means.
