= Presidential Commission on the Status of Women =

JFK-era advisory body to the U.S. president

External videos
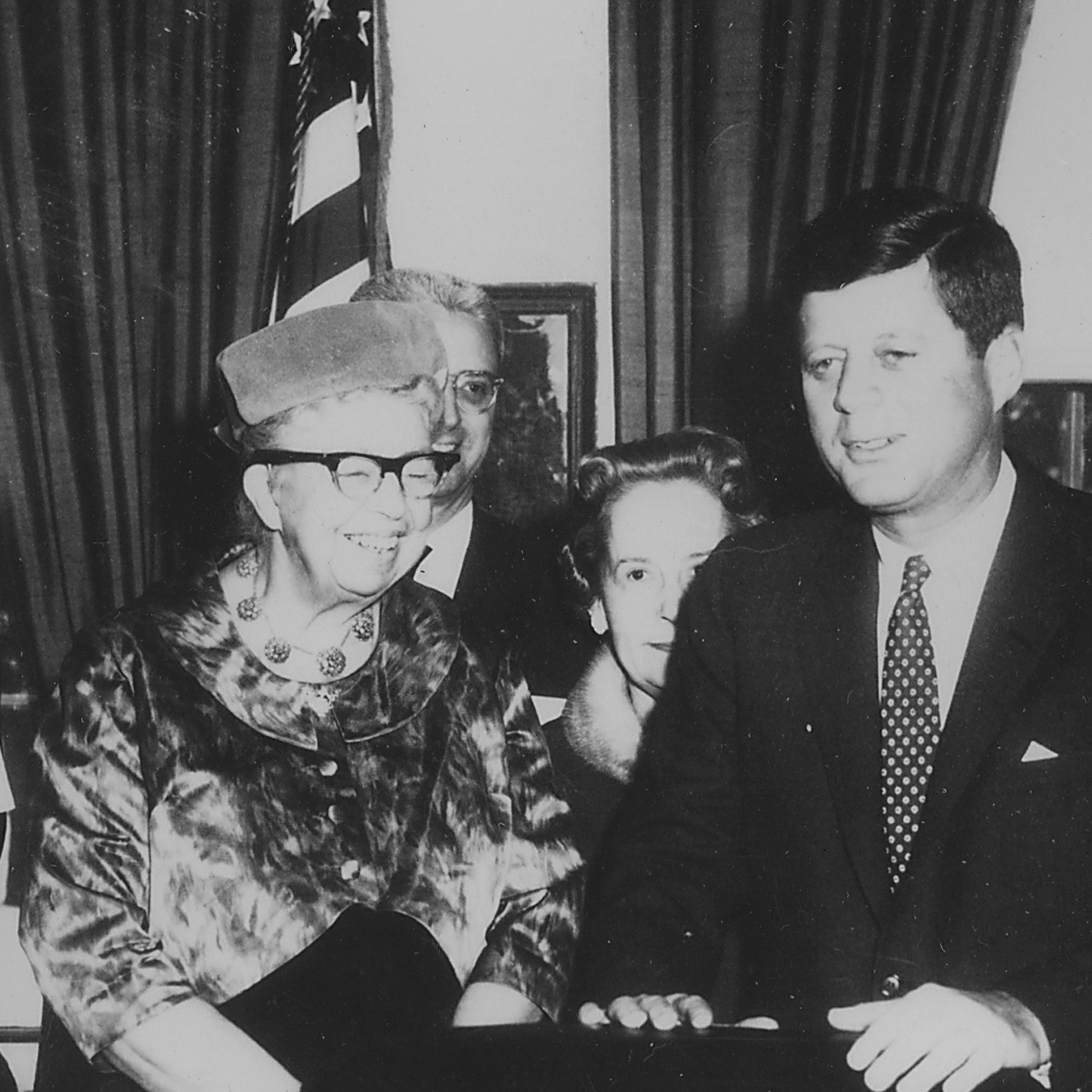
- Prospects of Mankind with Eleanor Roosevelt; What Status For Women?, 59:07, 1962. Eleanor Roosevelt, chair of the Commission, interviews President John F. Kennedy, Secretary of Labor Arthur Goldberg and others, Open Vault from WGBH

The President's Commission on the Status of Women (PCSW) was established to advise the President of the United States on issues concerning the status of women. It was created by John F. Kennedy's Executive Order 10980 signed December 14, 1961. In 1975 it became the National Association of Commissions for Women.

== Background ==
John F. Kennedy's administration proposed the President's Commission on the Status of Women to address people who were concerned about women's status while avoiding alienating the Kennedy administration's labor base through support of the Equal Rights Amendment. At the time, labor, which had been important to Kennedy's victory, opposed ratification of the Equal Rights Amendment believing instead that women required protective legislation—and fearing that the amendment would prevent this.

While running for the presidency in 1960, John F. Kennedy had earlier approached Eleanor Roosevelt for political support. Roosevelt refused to support him, remaining loyal to Adlai Stevenson II. She had disliked Kennedy's ties to Joe McCarthy and mediocre civil rights record. After Kennedy's election, he asked Roosevelt to chair a new commission proposed by Esther Peterson, then Director of the United States Women's Bureau. Roosevelt accepted appointment to chair the President's Commission on the Status of Women. This was her last public position.

=== Equality vs. protective legislation ===
Legislation related to women in the workplace up to this time had usually taken the form of protective legislation. Protective legislation advocated gender-based workplace restrictions specifically for women on the belief that their biological differences needed to be accommodated in the workplace. Supported by many 19th and early 20th century progressives including some we would now call feminists (difference feminists), protective legislation was supposed to help working women avoid workplace injury and exploitation. However, more often, protective legislation just provided employers with the justification to avoid hiring women altogether or to not pay them the same wages as men received. If women needed so many accommodations in the workplace, it was subsequently easier and cheaper for employers to only hire men.

Until the 1970s, trade unions/organized labor opposed the Equal Rights Amendment (which would have prevented laws holding different standards for men and women).

=== Forming the commission ===
The PCSW was the results of years worth of lobbying and activism by social feminists. Esther Peterson, founder of the Women's Committee of the International Confederation of Free Trade Unions, set up the Women for Kennedy National Committee in 1959 helping Kennedy in an extremely close race. In 1961, Paterson met with trade union women, including Dollie Robinson and Kitty Ellickson, and began to draft a proposal for the PCSW. Peterson sent the proposal to secretary Arthur Goldberg, who wrote to Kennedy using language from Ellickson's draft. This ultimately led to President Kennedy signing Executive Order 10980 which established the PCSW on December 14, 1961.

When PCSW began in 1961, Congress began considering 412 pieces of legislation related to women's status. The PCSW's very existence gave the federal government an incentive to again consider women's rights and roles as being a serious issue worthy of political debate and public policy-making.

The Kennedy administration itself publicly positioned the PCSW as a Cold War era initiative to free up women's talents for national security purposes. To win the global challenge against the Soviet Union, America needed the talents of all its citizens. Discrimination against women could mean that they were barred from important positions that they could fill.

Eleanor Roosevelt, widow of President Franklin D. Roosevelt, was appointed to chair the PCSW. Roosevelt chaired the PCSW until her death in 1962. No replacement was appointed, but Esther Peterson, the Executive Vice-chair of the commission, ran the commission until its conclusion.

Despite the push for women's rights, the full extent of Kennedy's support for the issue has been disputed. It has also been noted that his wife Jackie presented herself as a traditional wife after the time Betty Friedan published The Feminine Mystique.

== Members ==
PCSW Commission and committee members came from professional organizations, trade unions, and religious groups, as well as presidents of colleges and the Secretaries of all the relevant executive branch agencies. An effort was made to diversify membership, although most were white. Several men served on the various committees.

- Mrs. Eleanor Roosevelt, Chair
- Richard A. Lester, President of Economics, Princeton University, Vice Chair
- Mrs. Esther Peterson, Assistant Secretary of Labor, Executive Vice Chair
- Robert F. Kennedy, Attorney General
- Orville L. Freeman, Secretary of Agriculture
- Luther H. Hodges, Secretary of Commerce
- Arthur J. Goldberg, Secretary of Labor
- Abraham A. Ribicoff, Secretary of Health, Education, and Welfare
- John W. Macy Jr., chair, United States Civil Service Commission
- Senator George D. Aiken (R-Vermont)
- Senator Maurine B. Neuberger (D-Oregon)
- Representative Edith Green (D-Oregon)
- Representative Jessica M. Weis (R-New York)
- Mrs. Ellen Body, Rancher and civic leader, Henrietta, Texas
- Mary I. Bunting, President, Radcliffe College
- Mrs. Mary R. Callahan, Member, Executive Board, International Union of Electrical, Radio, and Machine Workers, AFL–CIO
- Henry David, President, New School for Social Research
- Miss Dorothy Height, President, National Council of Negro Women; Director, Leadership Training Services, Young Women's Christian Association
- Mrs. Margaret A. Hickey, lawyer, Contributing Editor, Ladies Home Journal
- Mrs. Viola H. Hymes, National President, National Council of Jewish Women
- Edgar F. Kaiser, Industrialist
- Miss Margaret J. Mealey, executive director, National Council of Catholic Women
- Katherine Pollak Ellickson, assistant director of Social Security, AFL–CIO
- Miss Marguerite Rawalt, lawyer, former president of National Federation of Business and Professional Women's Clubs; branch chief in Office of Chief Counsel, IRS
- William F. Schnitzler, Secretary-Treasurer, AFL–CIO
- Caroline Ware, Sociologist, Historian for UNESCO
- Cynthia Clark Wedel, psychologist, teacher, former vice president, National Council of Churches; Member, National Board of Girl Scouts of the USA
- Lillian Holland Harvey, Nurse, Dean of the Tuskegee School of Nursing

Rawalt helped found the National Organization for Women after she served on the PCSW.

== "American Women" ==
On October 11, 1963, coinciding with what would have been Eleanor Roosevelt's 79th birthday, the PCSW issued its final report, entitled "American Women", documenting the status of American women and making recommendations for further action.

The report criticized inequalities facing the American woman in a "free" society while acknowledging the importance of women's traditional gender roles.

Reflecting the then-position of labor and Kennedy's labor ties, the report avoided a flat statement about the Equal Rights Amendment. Instead, it stated that constitutional equality between men and women was essential and should be achieved through a Supreme Court decision holding that women were protected by the Fourteenth Amendment's equal protection clause. The Commission stated that because women were already entitled to constitutional protection against discrimination, it did not "now" endorse a constitutional amendment. However, some key members of the Commission said privately that they would support an equal rights amendment if the Court refused to extend the Fourteenth Amendment to cover women.

== Media cover and aftermath ==
U.S. Department of Labor Women’s Bureau head Esther Peterson appeared on The Today Show to discuss commission findings and ramifications.

The Associated Press ran a four-part nationwide story on the final report recommendations, and a 1965 mass-market book was published of the findings.

By 1962, the creation of a national commission encouraged states and localities (cities, colleges and universities, etc.) to begin studying women's status in their areas. All fifty states had commissions in operation by 1967.

In 1970 these commissions formed the Interstate Association of Commissions on the Status of Women (IACSW) and in 1975, the IACSW became the National Association of Commissions for Women (NACW) (www.nacw.org). At that time, the NACW expanded to include city and county commissions.

== Influence on the creation of the National Organization for Women ==
The PCSW research on women's status, as well as the research conducted by state commissions, demonstrated that discrimination against women was a serious problem. In 1964, the U.S. Department of Labor began to bring members of state commissions to Washington annually to discuss best practices to combat such discrimination.

At the 1966 meeting of commissions in Washington, several of the attendees began talking with each other about their frustrations with the Equal Employment Opportunity Commission's (EEOC) failure to enforce the provision barring sex discrimination in employment. Howard W. Smith (Virginia) had added "sex" into the employment provision (Title VII) of the 1964 Civil Rights Act at the request of the Virginia branch of the National Woman's Party so that white women would be protected by the Civil Rights Act. Smith, a long-time supporter of the Equal Rights Amendment, noted in his campaign literature in November 1964 that he was responsible for this amendment. The Act passed into law without additional floor debate. For the first time, the United States had a law against all sex discrimination in private employment.

Because the women interested in pressuring the EEOC were not allowed to pass such a resolution at the 1966 meeting of the state commissions on women, they decided they needed to create an independent organization—an "NAACP for women" which would press for enforcement of this law and for achieving other objectives.

The National Organization for Women (NOW) was founded by conference attendees in October 1966, the first new feminist organization of the "second wave" of feminism. A former EEOC commissioner, Richard Graham, was on NOW's first board as a vice president.

== See also ==
- Equal Pay Act of 1963
- Civil Rights Act of 1964
- Wage gap
- Economic inequality
- US labor law
