= Katherine Pollak Ellickson =

American trade unionist (1905–1996)

- Born: Katherine H. Pollak; September 1, 1905; Yonkers, New York, U.S.
- Died: December 28, 1996 (aged 91); La Jolla, California, U.S.
- Education: Vassar College (A.B.)
- Occupation: labor economist
- Spouse: John Chester Ellickson
- Children: Margaret, Robert

Katherine Pollak Ellickson (September 1, 1905 – December 28, 1996) was an American labor economist. For much of her career, she worked for the Congress of Industrial Organizations (CIO). During the Kennedy administration, she was executive director of the Presidential Commission on the Status of Women and helped create the Equal Employment Opportunity Commission.

== Early life ==
Katherine Pollak was born on September 1, 1905, in Yonkers, New York, and grew up in Manhattan in the midst of the Ethical Culture movement. Her father, Francis D. Pollak, was a lawyer as was her uncle, Walter Heilprin Pollak; her mother, Inez Cohen, was an activist involved in labor, feminist, and consumer issues. She attended the Ethical Culture School, a private preparatory school in New York City, and studied economics at Vassar, where she earned an A.B. degree in 1926. She pursued graduate studies at Columbia University.

== Career ==
Ellickson started her career in the workers' education movement, teaching and writing for Brookwood Labor College (1929–1932), the Bryn Mawr Summer School for Women Workers in Industry (1927–1949), and the Federal Emergency Relief Administration (FERA) Southern teachers' training school in 1934. She also did field work in the textile mills of the South and the coal mining camps of West Virginia.

In the late 1930s she worked for the fledgling Congress of Industrial Organizations (CIO) as assistant to director John Brophy at the national office, doing organizational work, research, and speechwriting. She also worked as an associate economist for the National Labor Relations Board. She became the CIO's Associate Director of Research in 1942, serving as liaison to the federal Bureau of Labor Statistics and representing the CIO on government advisory committees. After the merger with the American Federation of Labor (AFL) in 1955, she became assistant director of the AFL–CIO's Social Security Department. Later she recalled that the AFL–CIO was much less welcoming to women than the CIO had been.

In 1961 she was appointed by president John F. Kennedy to the President's Commission on the Status of Women and served as its executive director under former first lady Eleanor Roosevelt and assistant secretary of labor Esther Peterson from 1963 to 1965. She also helped create the federal Equal Employment Opportunity Commission (EEOC). She worked briefly for the United States Department of Health and Human Services before retiring in 1967.

== Personal life ==
Pollak married John Chester Ellickson, an agrarian economist, in 1933. The couple had two children and three grandchildren. Ellickson recalled in a 1976 interview that as a woman in the labor movement, being middle-class helped her career: early on, she was able to gain valuable experience working in low-paying positions, and later, she could afford to hire help to raise her children and nurse her husband through tuberculosis.

Ellickson's husband died in 1970. She died on December 28, 1996, at the White Sands retirement community in La Jolla, California. She was inducted posthumously into Labor's International Hall of Fame.

== Publications ==
- Ellickson, Katherine Pollak (1945). "Labor's Demand for Real Employment Security". The Yale Law Journal. 55 (1): 253–263. doi:10.2307/792828. JSTOR 792828.
- Ellickson, Katherine Pollak (1946). "Labor's Recent Demands". The Annals of the American Academy of Political and Social Science. 248: 6–10. doi:10.1177/000271624624800103. JSTOR 1025572. S2CID 144066751.
- Ellickson, Katherine P. (1963). "Progress of the Commission on the Status of Women". Monthly Labor Review. 86 (2). Bureau of Labor Statistics, U.S. Department of Labor: 141–144. JSTOR 41835169.
