= She-She-She Camps =

US New Deal–era camps for unemployed women

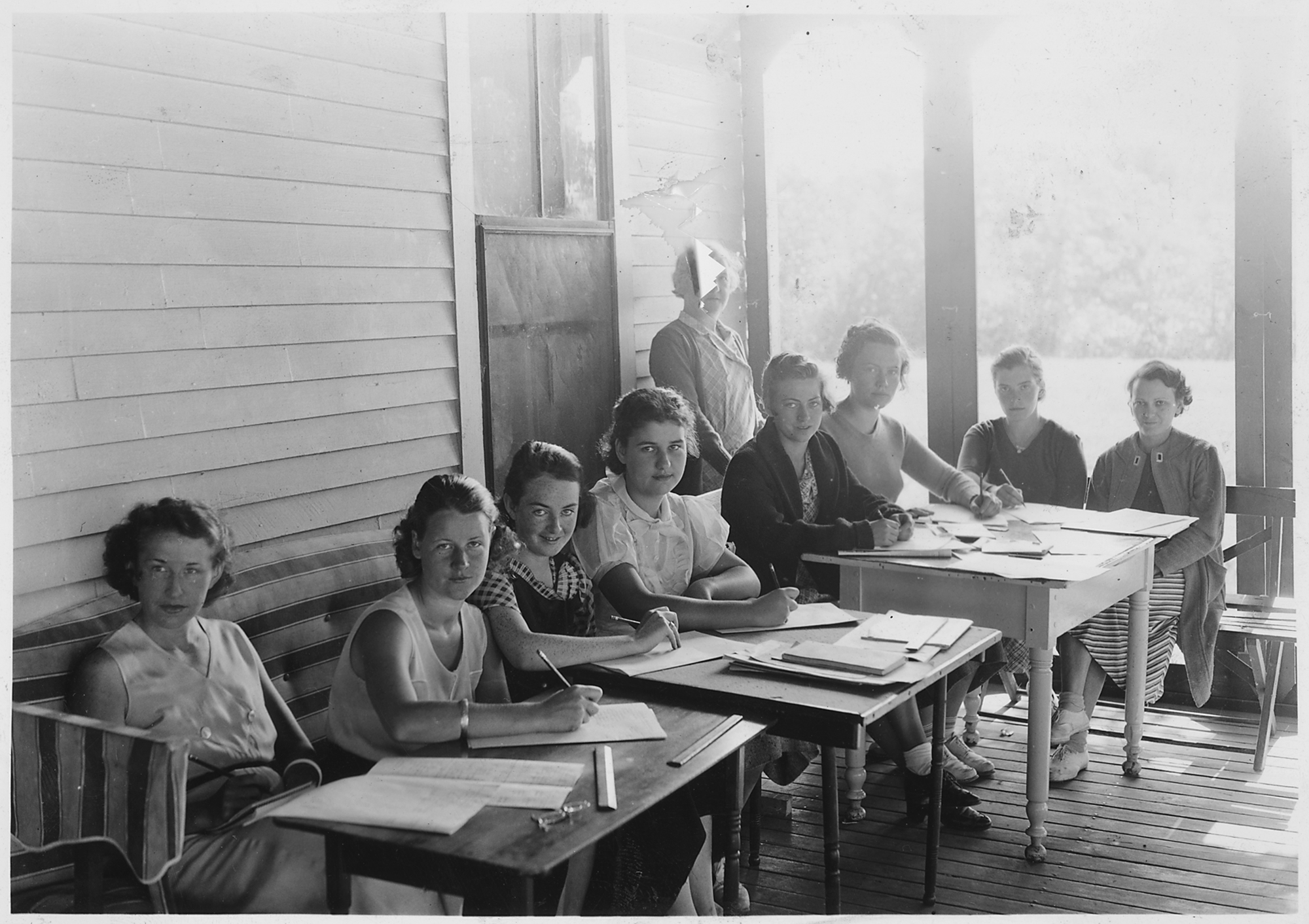
Federal Emergency Relief Administration camp for unemployed women in Maine (1934)

The Federal Emergency Relief Association (FERA) camps, also called She-She-She Camps, were camps established in the United States to aid unemployed women by providing jobs and training. The camps were organized by Eleanor Roosevelt as a women-focused counterpart to the Civilian Conservation Corps (CCC) programs, which catered solely to unemployed men. Roosevelt found that the CCC program's men-only focus left out young women willing to work in conservation and forestry and prepared to spend the six-month program living away from family and close support. Therefore, she lobbied for a sister organization to the CCC that would cater to young women. Roosevelt proposed that this program would consist of camps for jobless women and residential worker schools. The FERA camps, referred to as She-She-She camps by certain detractors, were funded by presidential order in 1933. Labor Secretary Frances Perkins championed one such camp after Roosevelt held a White House Conference for Unemployed Women on April 30, 1934, and subsequently Roosevelt's concept of a nationwide jobless women's camp was achieved. While the public largely supported New Deal programs such as the CCC, FERA camps reached a maximum of about 5,000 women annually by 1936 and served 8,500 women, thanks to Roosevelt's support. This compares to more than 3 million men who participated in the CCC.

== History ==
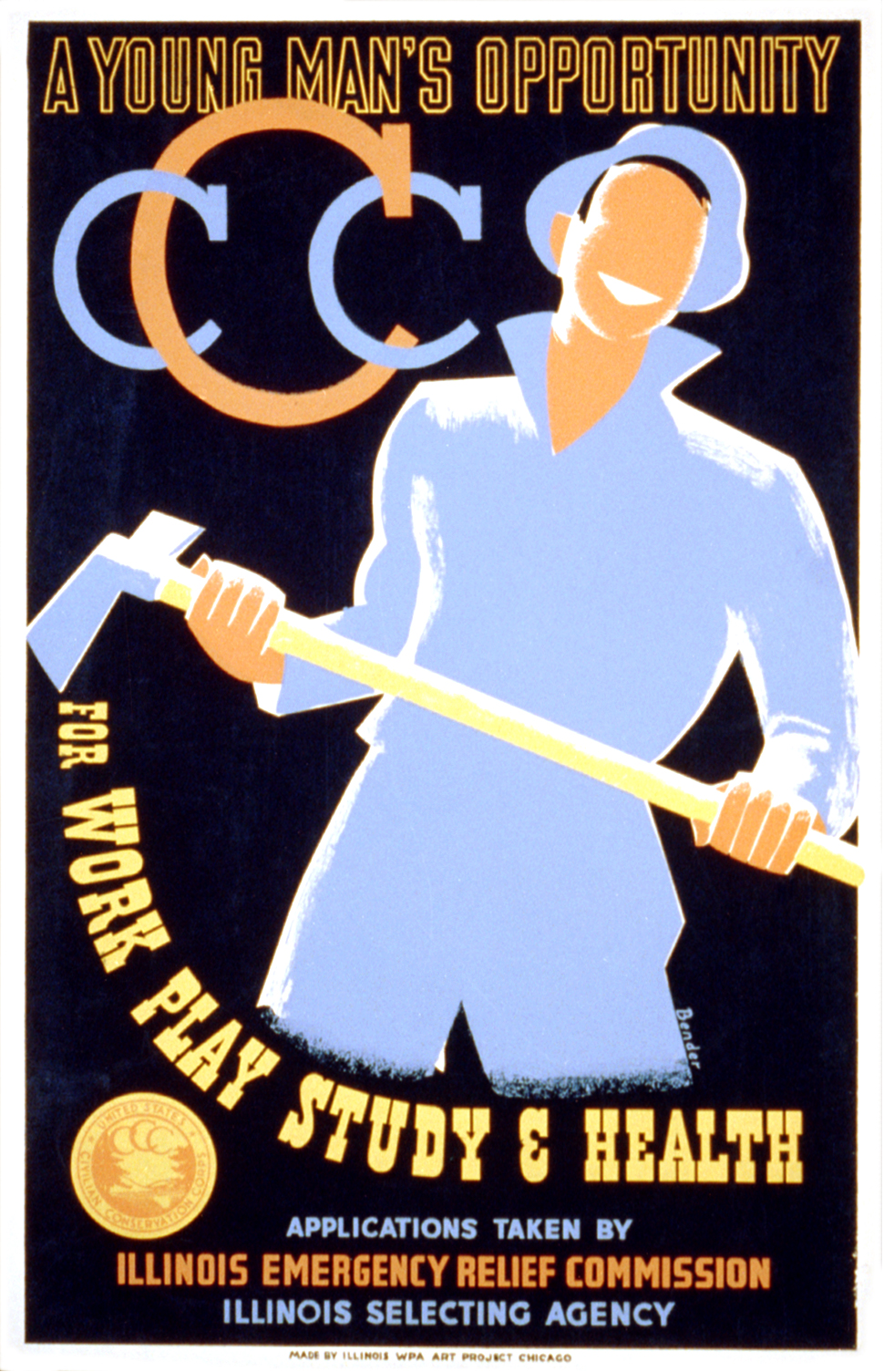
Civilian Conservation Corps poster (1935)

President Franklin Roosevelt valued the Civilian Conservation Corps (CCC) because the organization was fueled both by his passion for rural life and the philosophy of William James. James deemed this sort of program the "moral equivalent of war," channeling the passion for combat into productive service. These "tree armies" kept the young male population occupied and engaged with conservation, fighting wildland fires, building dams and creating man-made lakes. However, because the CCC was only available to young men, these positions were not available to women who needed jobs to provide for themselves and their families.

First Lady Eleanor Roosevelt was troubled by the plight of so many women, many of whom did not show up in the bread-lines but were relegated to living in subway tunnels and "tramping," foraging for subsistence outside urban areas. "As a group women have been neglected in comparison with others," the First Lady said, "and throughout this depression have had the hardest time of all."

The number of women seeking jobs grew to two million by 1933. During the Great Depression, many employers still subscribed to the idea that women belonged in the home and therefore "were less likely to hire married women and more likely to dismiss those they already employed." Similarly, many New Deal programs that outwardly sought to increase employment were conversely "built on the assumption that men would serve as breadwinners and women as mothers, homemakers, and consumers," and therefore created fewer job opportunities for unemployed women. The feminist writer Meridel Le Sueur wrote that once out of work, women "will go for weeks verging on starvation, crawling in some hole, going through the streets ashamed, sitting in libraries, parks, going for days without speaking to a living soul like some exiled beast".

In the middle of 1933, Eleanor Roosevelt met with Labor Secretary Frances Perkins to discuss the possibility of creating a woman-focused program of "camps" designed to provide relief for the unemployed. In May of the same year, President Roosevelt would go on to create the Federal Emergency Relief Administration (FERA), headed by statesman and advisor Harry Hopkins. Thanks to the persistence of the First Lady and Labor Secretary Perkins, over the course of the next months, Hopkins determined that FERA should intervene on behalf of women suffering from the Great Depression and unemployment crisis. Thus, in August 1933, he created a women's division of the FERA program, appointing Ellen Woodward as its director.

One month later, Hilda Worthington Smith would join Woodward as FERA's Workers' Education Specialist. Worthington Smith went to work for President Roosevelt with a great deal of experience in her field, having established the Bryn Mawr Summer School for Working Women a few years earlier in 1921.

On November 20, 1933, Eleanor Roosevelt and Ellen Woodward hosted a White House Conference regarding the urgent needs of women for jobs, food, and housing. It was at this conference that Worthington Smith suggested "the idea of a nationwide program of residential schools, where relief and recreation could be coupled with an educational program that instilled social responsibility." After receiving approval from director Harry Hopkins and collecting funding, Eleanor Roosevelt and Frances Perkins launched an initial, experimental camp for unemployed women, Camp TERA (Temporary Emergency Relief Administration).

== Camp TERA ==
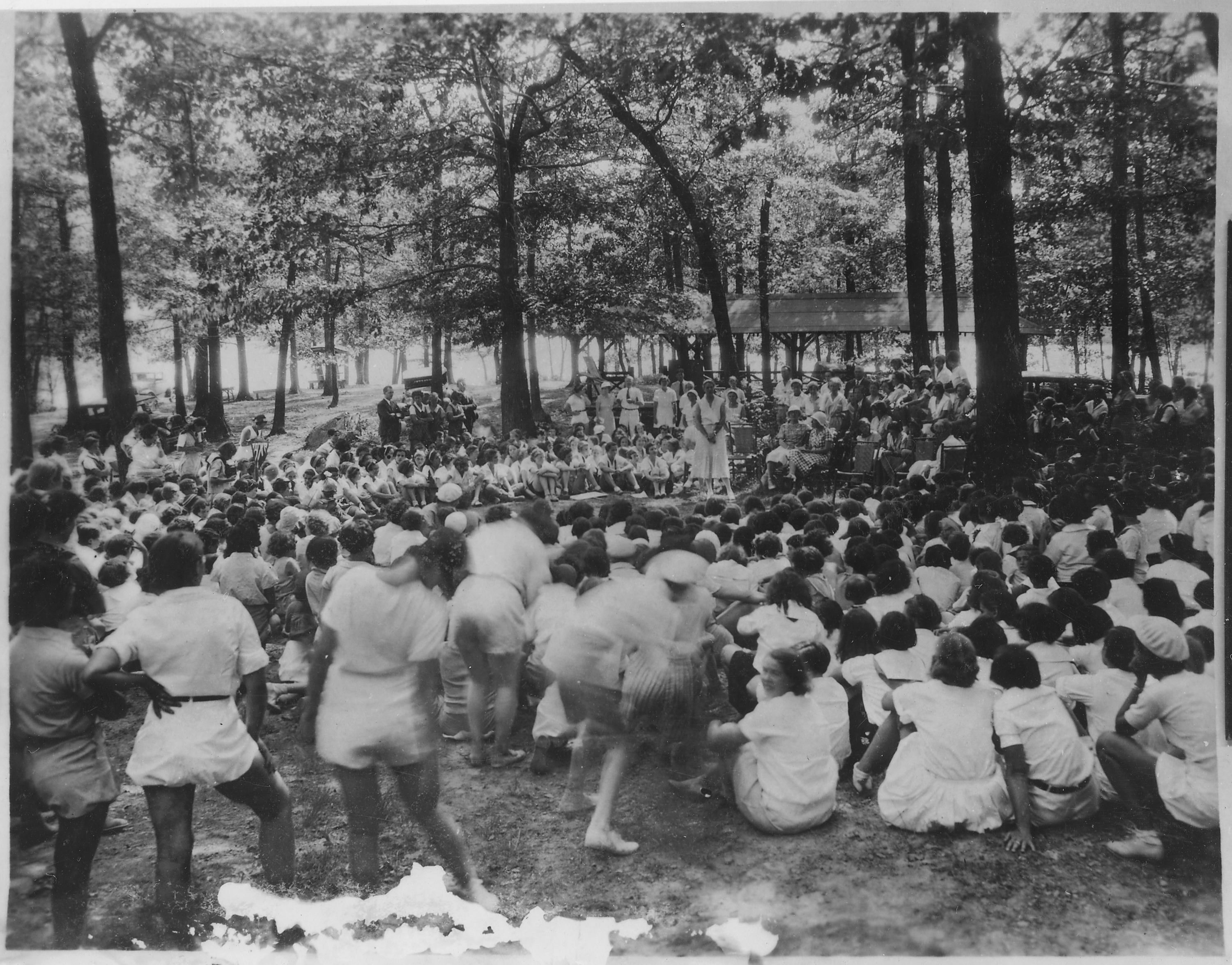
Eleanor Roosevelt (center) speaks to unemployed women at Camp TERA (Temporary Emergency Relief Assistance) at Harriman State Park (August 7, 1933)

It took several months, but with promotion and work, the first camp built was Camp TERA (Temporary Emergency Relief Assistance), later called Camp Jane Addams, in New York. There was a national outcry against Camp TERA and FERA camps in general, as it was seen as inappropriate for women to be put to work, especially in forestry. In order to make the camps less controversial, Worthington Smith suggested that FERA camps "instead of focusing on jobs...would emphasize education and domesticity."

Marian Tinker, a social worker who had attended Arnold College in New Haven, Connecticut and the University of Pennsylvania, was selected as Camp TERA's first director. Tinker had previously worked with young women in various organizations including the YWCA, the Girl Scouts, and several schools–experiences which made her the ideal candidate to manage the first FERA Camps.

Camp TERA began on June 10, 1933, with 17 young women from New York. While the site of Camp TERA was initially believed to be in the modern-day Bear Mountain State Park, recent research has determined that it was likely within the nearby Harriman State Park instead.

Eleanor Roosevelt first visited Camp TERA shortly after its opening. Although historical records differ on the exact numbers, it is agreed that she found only 20-30 women at the camp, a mere tenth of the number she had anticipated. First Lady Roosevelt appreciated the camp, but decided the requirements were too strict, as she found it unfair that such a small percentage of the 700 women who had applied met the criteria to participate in TERA efforts. She could not believe there were not enough women willing to accept the job and warned that the numbers had to increase or the idea might be abandoned. State Relief Administration representative Walter W. Pettit explained that there had been no "red tape" involved, arguing instead that each applicant had merely faced a "thorough investigation" to ensure that each woman truly had no other resources and were between 18 and 35 years of age. Regardless, Pettit claimed that 65 additional women would be added to Camp TERA's population within the week. Meanwhile, Eleanor Roosevelt moved to increase the maximum applicant age restriction to 40 years of age in an effort to loosen application requirements.

Camp TERA's numbers increased significantly, and the program was considered highly successful. Thus, with support from Hopkins, First Lady Roosevelt and her associates would oversee the creation of a nationwide program of similar FERA Camps in 1934.

=== Critics ===
Men laboring in CCC camps were highly amused by their female counterparts. Writing for a CCC newspaper, one noted how little work women at Camp TERA did, adding, "Some of the girls are pretty. All are happy. They say they may never want to go back to New York, from where they came. Life has been tough for most of them." Pauli Murray, who would later become a lawyer, writer, black civil rights activist, and episcopal priest, arrived at Camp TERA on the advice of her doctor at the end of 1933. Living on the edge of poverty and diagnosed with pleurisy, she found her time there cut short after she clashed with the camp's director, Miss Mills. An ambulance driver during World War I and an authoritarian, Mills attempted to run the camp on semi-military lines. Murray had a copy of Das Kapital in her bags, and when director Mills found it, she ejected her from the camp. Murray would later become a close friend of Eleanor Roosevelt. The singing of leftist songs at camp sing-alongs became a focus of detractors. It was not surprising that there were leftists in the camps, given that they were not far removed from the "Hoovervilles", and the troubadour-style of fellow travelers like singer Woody Guthrie fueled these sing-alongs. It was also unsurprising that, in 1936, controversies over communist influence enveloped the camp. In July 1936, the American Legion of Rockland County accused Camp TERA officials of using Federal funding for communist purposes. The new Director, Bernice Miller, countered the charges, saying that "the campers were permitted the completest freedom to say and discuss what they wanted, and sing any songs they wanted to". She was also quick to add that most supported the government. As to complaints of the Internationale and radical satires being sung, and that controversial material was being read, some, Miller admitted, were "of communist and socialist persuasion". Also adding to embarrassment, women from Camp TERA "escaped" and visited a men's CCC camp nearby. A teacher at Camp TERA, Harry Gersh, commented, "It was a most unnatural environment for these women. No one had thought that sexual isolation would be a problem".

After returning home to New York City from Camp TERA, some of the women joined the radical Workers' Alliance. Spokeswoman for the organization Sarah Rosenberg, a vocal critic of the benefit of the She-She-She camps, said, "More than one girl says there is nothing left except suicide or tramping on the roads".

== Culture ==
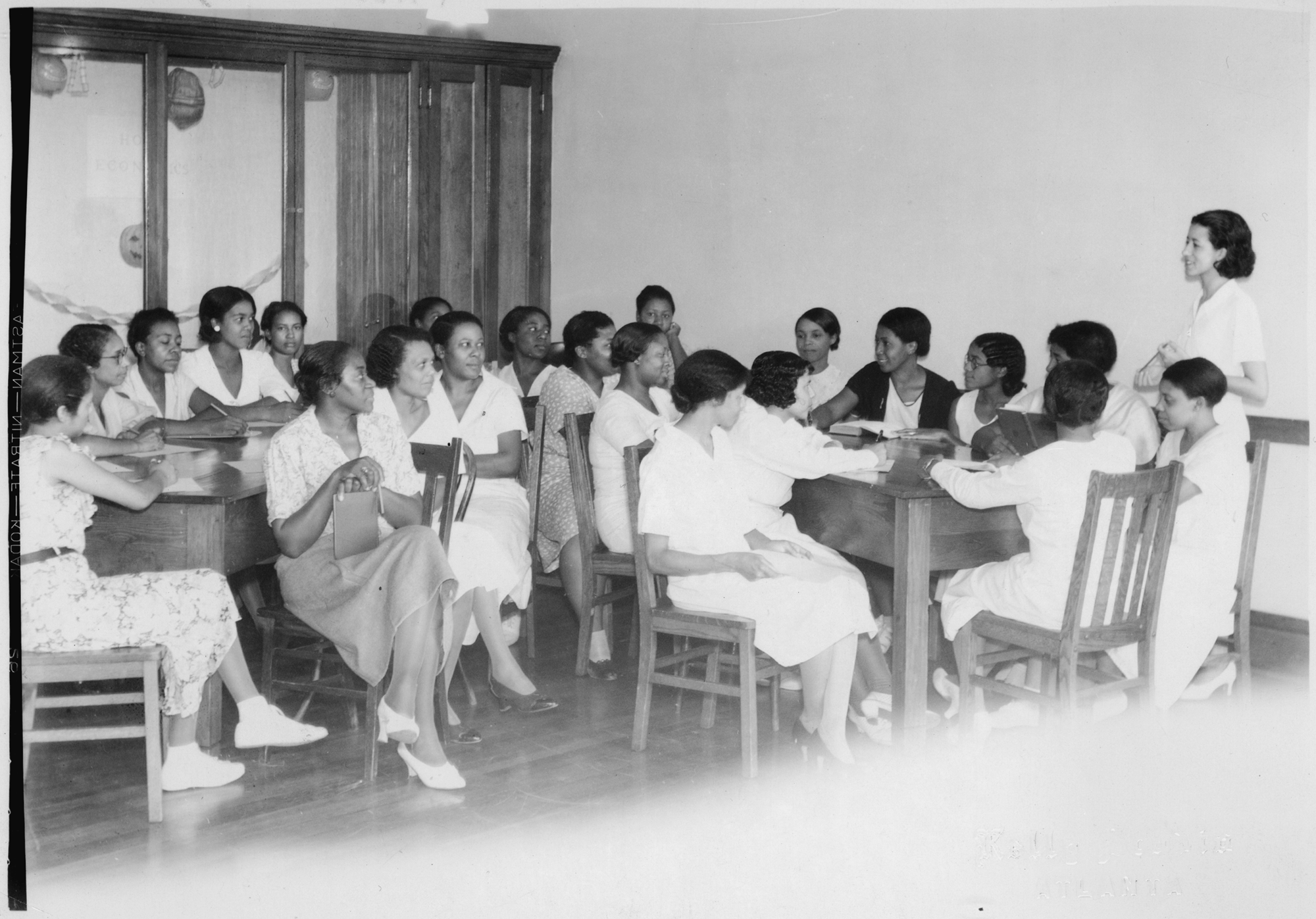
FERA camp for unemployed women in Atlanta (1934)

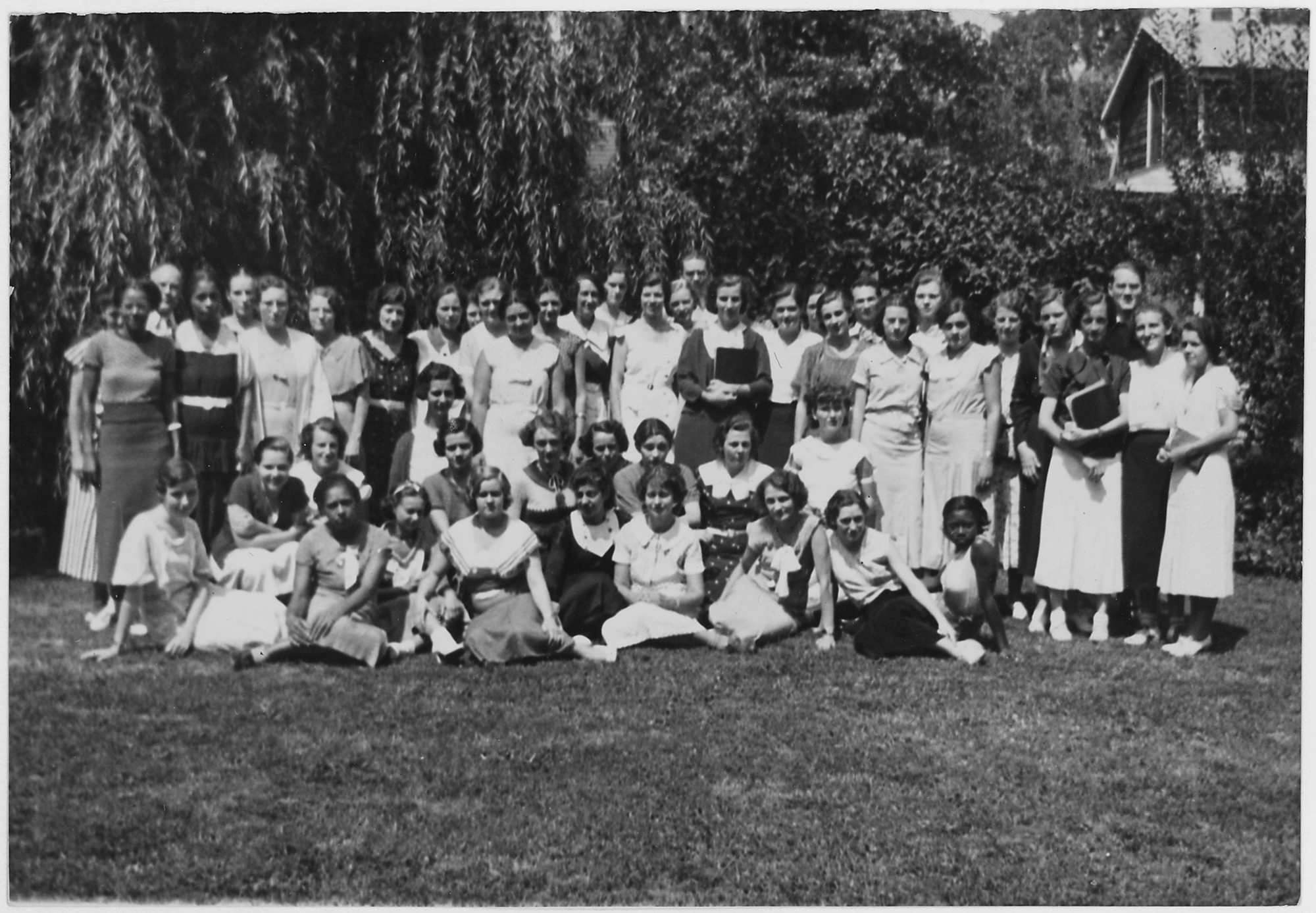
FERA camp for unemployed women office workers in Oberlin, Ohio (1934)

By 1936, more than 90 camps had been created across the United States, and more than 8,500 women had cycled through them before they were closed. Each reflected the culture of its location and depended heavily on what was available locally, including resources and talent. There are audio histories of communities cleaning old facilities and donating beds, clothes, food, and other staples for the women. Many North Dakota Indigenous women left the reservation for the very first time to attend camp programs. Oberlin College welcomed stenographers and clerical workers at its Summer School for Office Workers. Barnard College in New York City hosted classes for unemployed unionized women. Black sharecropper women in the South studied at an agricultural college in Arkansas. The YWCA in Philadelphia provided a space for 40 women to study and live. Unemployed professional women in New Jersey attended a specially created program. In Michigan, rented houses provided unemployed women instruction in housekeeping skills. In the Ozarks, women attended literacy classes.

== Details ==
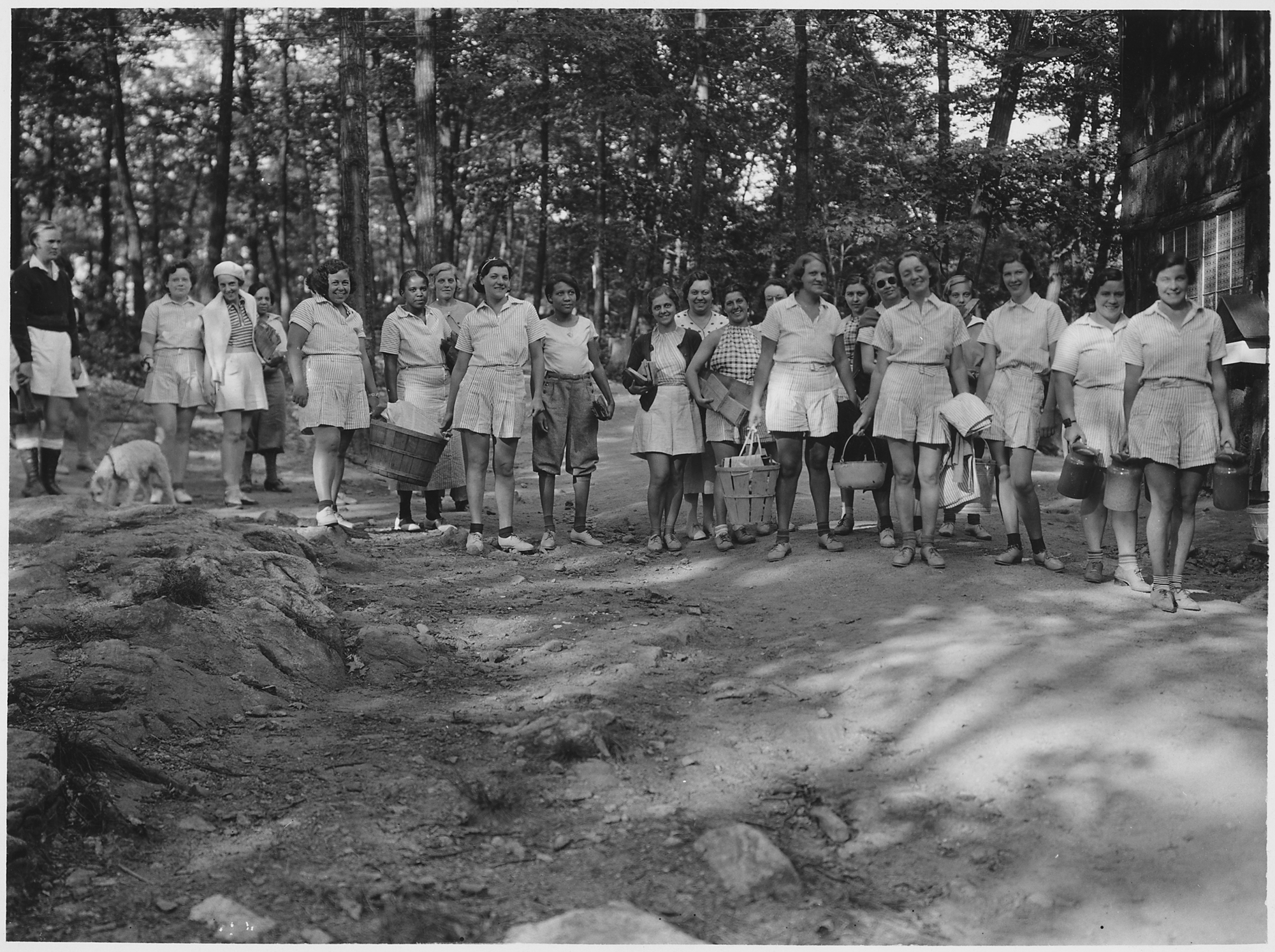
FERA camp for unemployed women in New Jersey (1934)

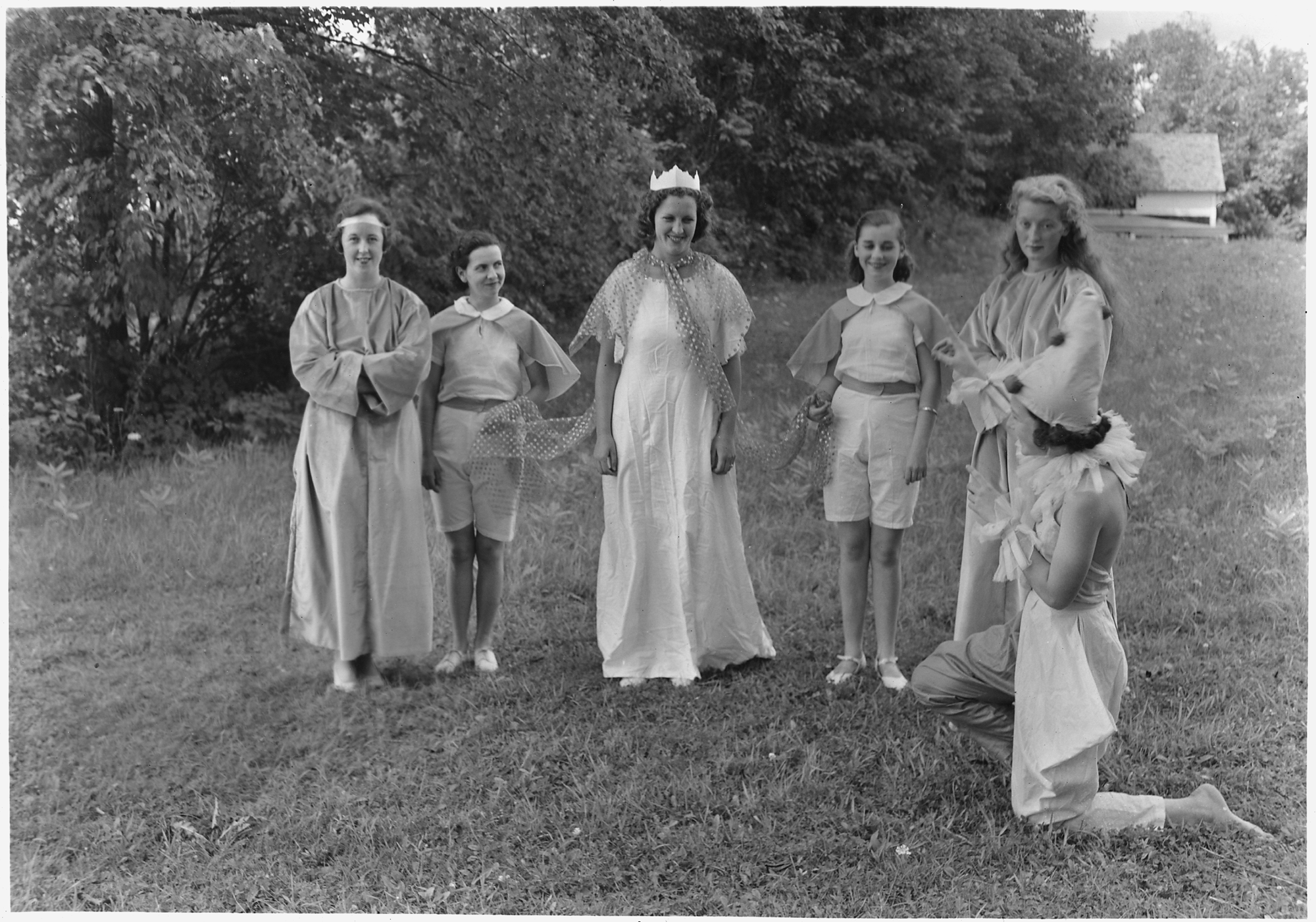
FERA camp for unemployed women in Maine (1934)

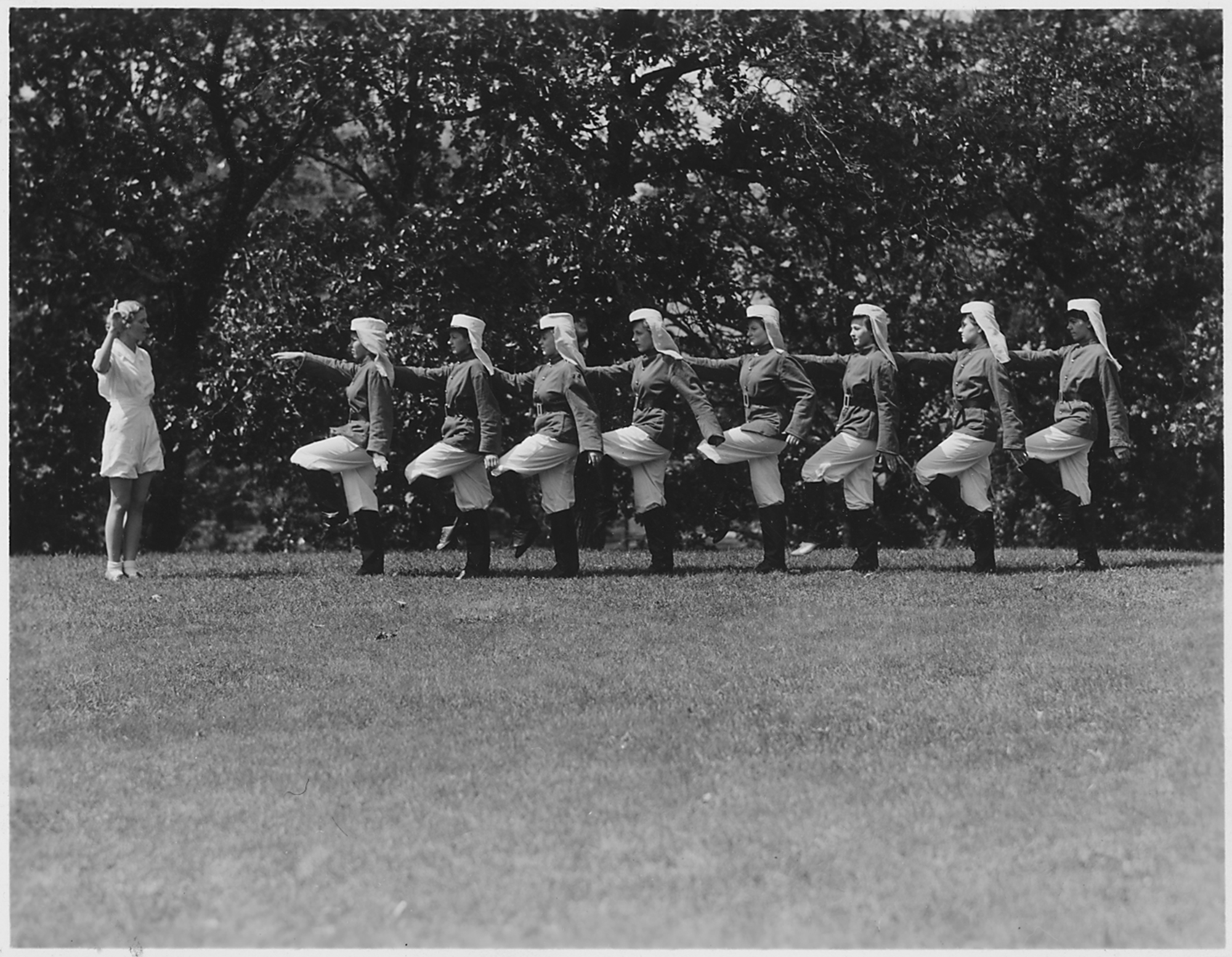
FERA camp for unemployed women in Minnesota (1934)

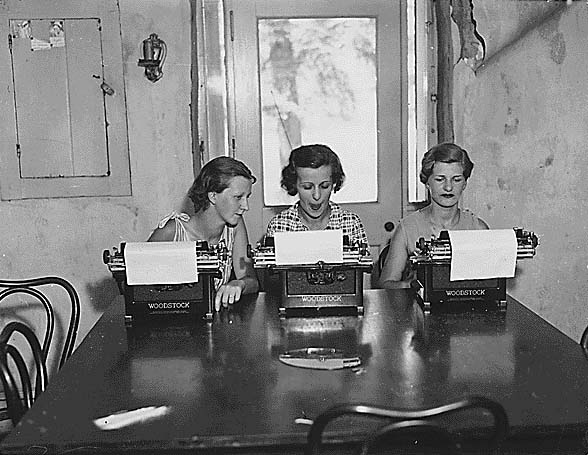
FERA camp for unemployed women in Pennsylvania (1934)

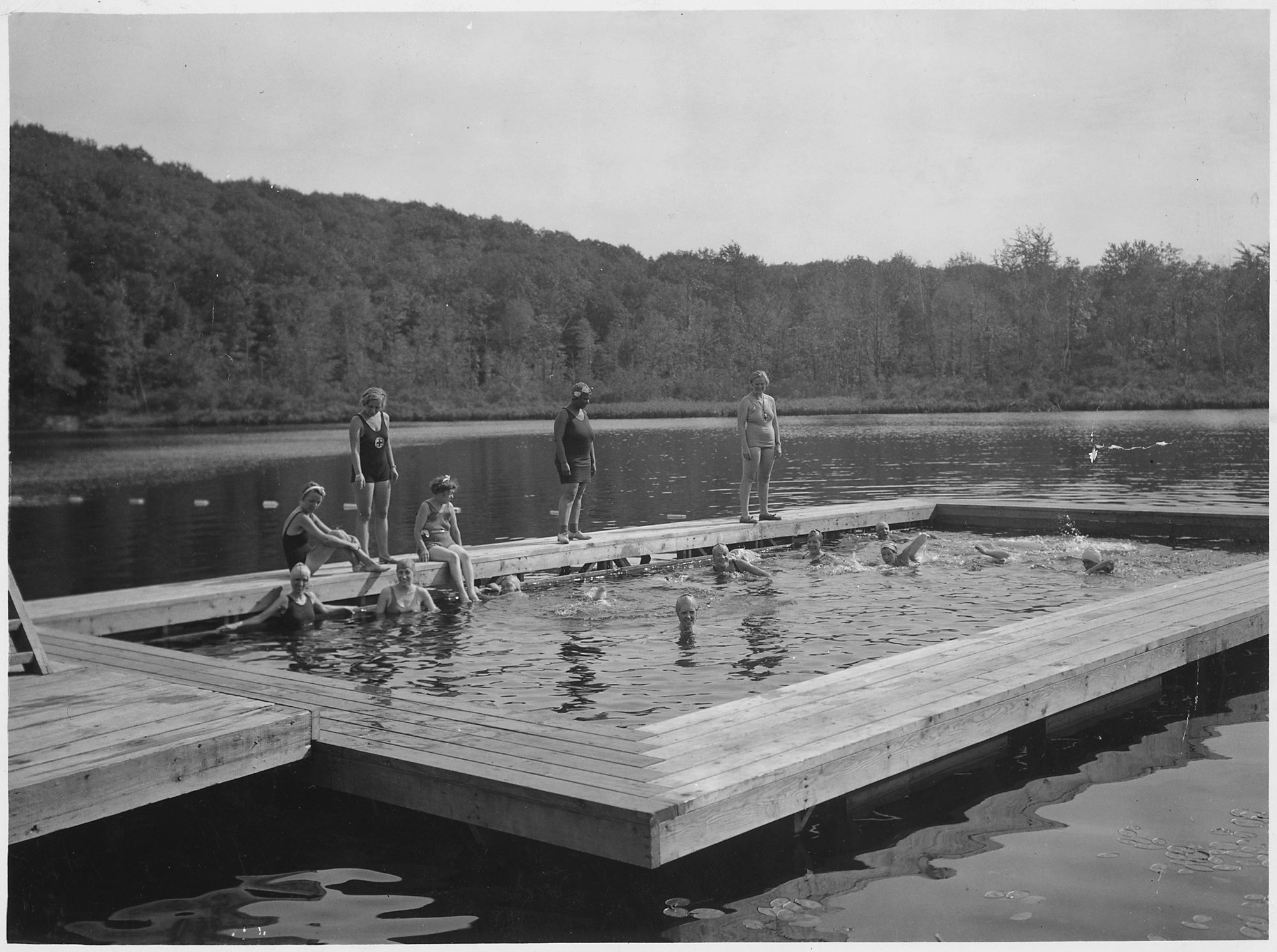
Swimming pool at a New Jersey FERA camp for unemployed women (1934)

The personal allowance for women was the same as that for men, $5 every month (equivalent to $124 in 2025) for personal needs in exchange for 56–70 hrs work per month on camp work projects. No remittance was sent back home, as was the case for the CCC men's allowance. The camps were located in facilities with heat, lighting, and sanitary conveniences—typically summer hotels, abandoned CCC camps, and vacated schools. They were administered by female camp directors, project supervisors, staff teachers, and counselors. The average camp had around 100 women, with a supervisory staff of 10–20, including cooks and a nurse. Each enrollee was assigned fixed hours of work on camp assignments, including working in forest nurseries at some camps. Other made and repaired toys and playground equipment, while some worked at creating visual training aids for public schools. Those with visual disabilities (there were camps for the blind) would make finished bedding or use natural materials to create woven products. Sewing equipment enabled the women to make their own clothing (one popular class was to make dresses from empty cloth feed bags) and no uniforms were required. WPA programs also supplied clothing, and canneries were used for teaching and for product production. Layettes and hospital sundries were made for public institutions and other WPA nursing projects. Maintenance of the barracks, housekeeping, and kitchen duties, along with instruction in economics and cooking, were integral to the residential program, which lasted three to four months and was not subject to re-enrollment. Native American women were given an additional allotment to find rental housing and traveled with the men who left the reservation to work. No camps were established exclusively for Native American men, so many traveled as a family group. Blacks were still segregated at this time, but in their camps were given the same educational opportunities.

The educational program included English, adult education, domestic science, hygiene, public health, and economics. Games, athletic contests, hikes, music, and drama groups were included in the recreational plans, and handicraft activities were encouraged. Some schools' camps offered typing and secretarial classes. The cost per enrollee was estimated at $39, plus $5 for personal expenses. They worked to cover food costs (taken from the $5), lodging, and medical care. The camps operated year-round, and NYA (National Youth Administration) employment was required. (The NYA took over from the TERA in 1936 in administering FERA (Federal Emergency Relief Administration)).

When the housing and shelter crisis eased in 1937, the NYA decided that the women's program was too costly and shut it down. Most of the women who were approved had led hard lives during the Depression and found the duties a relief from the meager sustenance in the cities, many embracing the outdoors with a vigor to match that of the young men working in the CCC camps.

The She-She-She camps for women closed on October 1, 1937. The NYA (National Youth Administration), then in charge of the program, criticized the objectives and necessity of the camps and decided they were too expensive. As the crisis of hunger and homelessness eased, the camp program for women could no longer be justified, and it ended. Eleanor Roosevelt was never happy with either the women's or the men's camps. She objected to the military aspect of the CCC from the outset, but the success of the CCC and other New Deal programs left her with other anti-poverty programs and women-centered initiatives to pursue. Her vision was a two-year program for young men and women to be devoted to domestic projects such as conservation, health care, education, and settlement houses. At the end of 1933, after Camp TERA was established, she had stated, "There is nothing more exciting than building a new social order."
