= Elizabeth Nord =

American labor organizer

- Born: Elizabeth Nord; 16 May 1902; Lancashire, England
- Died: 3 August 1986 (aged 84); Rhode Island, United States
- Other names: Elizabeth Nord
- Education: Bryn Mawr Summer School for Women Workers in Industry
- Occupation: labor organizer

Elizabeth Nord (May 16, 1902 - August 3, 1986) was an American labor organizer. She was one of the leaders of the great textile strike of 1934 and the first woman to serve on the executive board of the Textile Workers Union of America.

== Early life ==
Elizabeth Nord was born in Lancashire, England on May 16, 1902. Her father, Richard Nord, was a coal miner, and her mother, Elizabeth Jackson, was a weaver. At 14, she went to work in a silk factory. In the 1920s, she moved with her family to Rhode Island. She worked as a weaver in the mills of Pawtucket, continuing her education at night school. She attended the Bryn Mawr Summer School for Women Workers in Industry in 1923 and 1924, and the Vineyard Shore School for Women Workers in 1930. She also worked as a tutor at the Barnard College Summer School.

== Career ==
She joined the United Textile Workers Union in 1928. She went on to become chairman of the New England Silk and Rayon Workers, and was one of the leaders of the great textile strike of 1934. She continued organizing for the United Textile Workers in New England and Virginia, and served as the union's legislative representative in Washington. In 1937 she went to work for the Textile Workers Union of America (TWUA), organizing in New England. In 1939 she was the first woman to be elected to the TWUA's executive board, serving there until 1946. She was a TWUA trustee from 1947 to 1956. In 1955 she joined the Board of Review of the Rhode Island Department of Employment Security as a Member Representing Labor.

In 1976 she was interviewed as part of a National Endowment for the Humanities documentary about the Bryn Mawr summer school, The Women of Summer. The documentary was released in 1985 and has won several awards.
