= Rose Parsons =

Rose Parsons, born Rose Saltonstall Peabody and sometimes known as Rose Peabody Parsons (1891–1985) was an American woman associated with the formation and management of a number of US women's organisations including the National Council of Women of the United States, the 1947-onwards Women United for United Nations and the 1952-onwards Committee of Correspondence, and the International Council of Women.

== Biography ==
Rose Peabody was born in 1891, the daughter of Endicott Peabody, an Episcopal priest and Fannie Peabody, his cousin, both descended from Joseph Peabody (1757-1844), one of the wealthiest men in the United States at the time of his death, and part of a well-connected family. Endicott Peabody's first cousin was Alice Lee Roosevelt, first wife of American President Theodore Roosevelt.

According to Peabody's sister-in-law, around the time of World War 1 Rose Peabody took a Nurse's Aid course at a Presbyterian Hospital in New York and was then posted to France where, after some general nursing duties, she was appointed to manage an orphanage at Étretat; later she acted as an American Red Cross Searcher for Home Communication Service for Mobile Hospital No. 2, until that unit was disbanded. Again, according to her sister-in-law, she received the Croix de Guerre for bravery under fire.

Rose Peabody married Dr. William Barclay Parsons on 22 March 1919. Parsons was a surgeon with whom Peabody had trained at the Presnyterian hospital, and with whom she had served in France.

Parsons's New York Time obituary describes her as being in charge of Red Cross volumnteers in the North Atlantic aea during World War II.

Parsons was the initiator and first chairperson of Women United for United Nations, a clearing house for pro-United Nations stories, which was founded in 1947.

She acted as president of the National Council of Women in 1956 and as vice president of the International Council of Women in 1954.

Parsons husband pre-deceased her in 1973. The couple had two daughters. Parsons died on 28 March 1985.
