= Lillian Herstein =

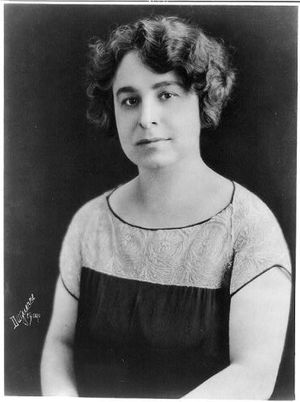
- Born: April 2, 1886; Chicago
- Died: August 9, 1983 (aged 97)
- Known for: Farmer Labor Party

Lillian Herstein (April 2, 1886 – August 9, 1983) was an American labor organizer and public school teacher based in Chicago, Illinois. She was a founder of the Farmer Labor Party and in 1932 ran for Congress on its ticket. In the 1930s, she was considered one of the most influential women in the American labor movement and was appointed by President Franklin Roosevelt to serve on the U.S. delegation to an International Labour Organization meeting in Europe.

== Early life and education ==
Herstein was born in Chicago, Illinois to a Russian Jewish family that had emigrated to the United States from Lithuania. She was the youngest of six children of Wolf Herstein, the sexton of a synagogue, and Cipe Belle Herstein, who ran the C.B. Herstein Hebrew Book Store. Her father died when she was just 12, leaving the family in financial difficulties, and she was the only one of the children to go to high school. She graduated from Northwestern University with a degree in Latin and Greek (1907) and went on to get an M.A. from the University of Chicago (1924).

== Teaching ==
After college, Herstein initially had difficulty getting a teaching job because of antisemitism. Once hired, she taught in various Illinois and Indiana high schools for five years before settling into the Chicago public school system. After a few years, she was promoted to teach at Crane Junior College, where she remained for the rest of her 36 years of teaching. One of her students, future Supreme Court Justice Arthur Goldberg, said Herstein inspired him to go into labor law. She also taught occasionally in junior colleges and at the University of Wisconsin, the University of Chicago, and the Bryn Mawr Summer School for Women Workers in Industry.

== Labor organizing and politics ==
Around 1914, Herstein became active in labor organizing after joining a local affiliate of the American Federation of Teachers. She represented her union in the Chicago Federation of Labor (CFL) and for a quarter of a century was the only woman to serve on the CFL's executive board. She was also active in the local branch of the Women's Trade Union League and the Jewish Labor Committee, and she helped to organized the Brotherhood of Sleeping Car Porters, the first labor union led by African-Americans. In the 1930s, she headed up the workers' education program of the Chicago Works Progress Administration. She was known as an eloquent speaker and often went on speaking tours and radio shows.

In the 1920s, she helped to found the Farmer Labor Party, and in 1932 she ran for Congress as its candidate, gaining less than 2% of the vote. In 1936, she worked for the reelection of President Franklin Roosevelt, and the following year he asked her to serve on the U.S. delegation to the International Labour Organization meeting in Switzerland. That same year, Life magazine referred to her as "the most important woman in the American labor movement".

During World War II, Herstein served on the U.S. War Production Board as its Woman Consultant for the West Coast, where she helped women working in war industries.

Herstein retired from teaching around 1951 but remained active in labor organizing and politics through the 1960s. She died in 1983, aged 97.
