= Ida Craven Merriam =

American economist and statistician

Ida Craven Merriam (1904–1997) was an American economist and statistician who became "one of the seminal figures in the early administration of the Social Security program", helping to found the nonprofit National Academy of Social Insurance.

Ida Craven, a native of Philadelphia, Pennsylvania, was born on November 6, 1904. She graduated Phi Beta Kappa in English and history from Wellesley College in 1925, where she was president of the Wellesley Forum. She studied economics at the University of Chicago, and then earned a Ph.D. in 1928 from the Brookings Graduate School of Economics and Government in Washington, D.C. While working towards her doctorate at Brookings, she taught a summer economics class at the Bryn Mawr Summer School for Women Workers in Industry. After completing her studies, she worked for the Encyclopedia of Social Sciences and as an assistant professor at the Connecticut College for Women, and married Mylon Merriam in 1933.

She left her position at Connecticut College in 1936 to work in the research and statistics bureau of the Social Security Administration, soon after the creation of the SSA in 1935, She became the head of that unit and Assistant Commissioner of the Office of Research and Statistics in 1955. As Assistant Commissioner, she published special reports on topics including housing, benefit levels, health insurance, disability, widows, work-life balance, prospects for future retirees, and related social welfare systems in Europe. Her unit also set the first poverty thresholds for the US. She retired in 1972.

In 1965, she was elected as a Fellow of the American Statistical Association "for outstanding sustained accomplishments and contributions through statistical research to social insurance and social welfare." The United States Civil Service Commission gave Merriam a Federal Woman's Award in 1966, and she also won the Distinguished Service Award of the Department of Health, Education and Welfare.

== Death ==
Ida Craven Merriam died on April 8, 1997, in Cheverly, Maryland, near the Collington Episcopal Life Care Center in Mitchellville, Maryland, where she had been an inpatient for three years before her death.
