= Committee of Correspondence (women's organization) =

United States women's Cold War internationalist organization

The Committee of Correspondence was an American anti-communist women's organization active from 1952 to 1969. A group of women active in international affairs voluntary clubs and professional fields created the committee as an counterpart to the National Council of Women. The committee established itself as an independent non-profit organization shortly after it began.

== Founding and mission ==
Oriented toward anti-communism, the organization convened its first meeting in 1952 to answer the question, "what steps should be taken to rally the women of the free world to counteract communist propaganda?" Over time, the Committee evolved into a communications network that aimed to bring women's clubs around the world into closer contact. The Committee sought to make an impact on a diverse international network of clubwomen and professionals. Its efforts promoted cooperation across national borders and encouraged the development of women's non-governmental organizations affiliated with the United Nations.

An advisory organization rather than a membership group, the Committee consisted of a governing board of roughly a dozen women and a small paid staff, which, at times, included field workers who carried out Committee projects in foreign countries. The Committee sought "to provide an international communications link for the exchange of ideas, information and experience among women leaders throughout the world." It did so by cultivating contacts with "correspondents," representatives of women's groups from around the globe who subscribed to the organization's newsletter and participated in its conferences and educational initiatives. Ultimately, five thousand women in 140 countries participated in Committee ventures.

The committee was named after the associations through which American Revolution leaders shared information and created alliances across geographical divides. Other names that the Committee of Correspondence considered in its first year included Committee on Constructive Action, Blank Committee, and, referring to its work countering Communist propaganda, the Wreckers Committee.

== Membership and activities ==
The membership of the Committee of Correspondence was largely white and elite. Well-situated women active in voluntary clubs-including Constance Forrest Anderson, a leader in the Young Women's Christian Association of the US, and Rose Parsons, an officer of the International Council of Women-were able to donate considerable time to the organization. Others - notably Eunice Carter and Dorothy Height, both officers of the National Council of Negro Women, as well as Eleanor Coit, like Height, a long-time employee of the Young Women's Christian Association — had professional leadership roles in other such groups. The Committee attracted correspondents who were elite volunteers or middle-class professionals. Such women were able to travel internationally and often receptive to the anti-communist tenor of the committee.

While the organization was a product of Cold War liberalism, one its more influential lines of work pointed to an emergent model of internationalism based more on empowering the grassroots and facilitating small-scale community development rather than middle-class uplift. In the early 1960s the Committee hired field workers for short-term programs in leadership and skills training for community leaders in foreign countries. Sarale Owens, a former YWCA executive, earned considerable acclaim during her two years spent in East Africa as a Committee field worker. The committee also sent personnel to Latin America.

== Revelations of C.I.A. funding and dissolution ==
Despite the committee's successes at promoting contacts among women's organizations and hosting conferences both in and out of the United States, it could not recover from revelations published in Ramparts magazine in 1967 that it was among the international organizations covertly funded by the Central Intelligence Agency. Supportive of the committee's commitment to liberal anti-communism, the CIA had funneled funding for the Committee through private foundation grants. The degree to which the CIA had an influence on the committee's programming is disputed. Some members were in contact with CIA agents; others were not aware of such activities. Several Committee efforts were directed at countries of special interest to the CIA. These included a 1961 conference for Latin American journalists that coincided with the Bay of Pigs invasion. Another was a 1963 conference in Iran on the "Role of Women in the Community." The event garnered the participation of Ashraf Pahlavi, twin sister to Mohammed Reza Pahlavi, the Shah who had taken power after the 1953 CIA-sponsored coup.

After the expose in Ramparts, which was further publicized in a series of New York Times articles, President Lyndon Johnson curtailed CIA funding of private foundations. Unable to fill the breach through traditional fundraising methods, the Committee of Correspondence elected to dissolve in 1969.
