= Helen Muchnic =

Helen Muchnic was an American scholar and writer, specializing in Russian language and literature. She taught for many years at Smith College, where she was appointed Helen and Laura Shedd Professor of Russian Language and Literature. Her friends included the writers Edmund Wilson and Elizabeth Bishop. She wrote a number of scholarly works, including:

- An Introduction to Russian Literature
- From Gorky to Pasternak: six modern Russian writers
- Dostoevsky's English reputation, 1881-1936
- The unhappy consciousness: Gogol, Poe, Baudelaire

She also contributed regularly to scholarly and popular journals such as the New York Review of Books.

Muchnic lived with her partner Dorothy Walsh, philosopher, also a Smith professor, in the town of Cummington, Massachusetts.
