= Luke Fleet Lester =

American electrical engineer

Luke Fleet Lester from the University of New Mexico, Albuquerque, NM was named Fellow of the Institute of Electrical and Electronics Engineers (IEEE) in 2013 for contributions to quantum dot lasers.
