= Esther Peterson =

American consumer rights activist (1906–1997)

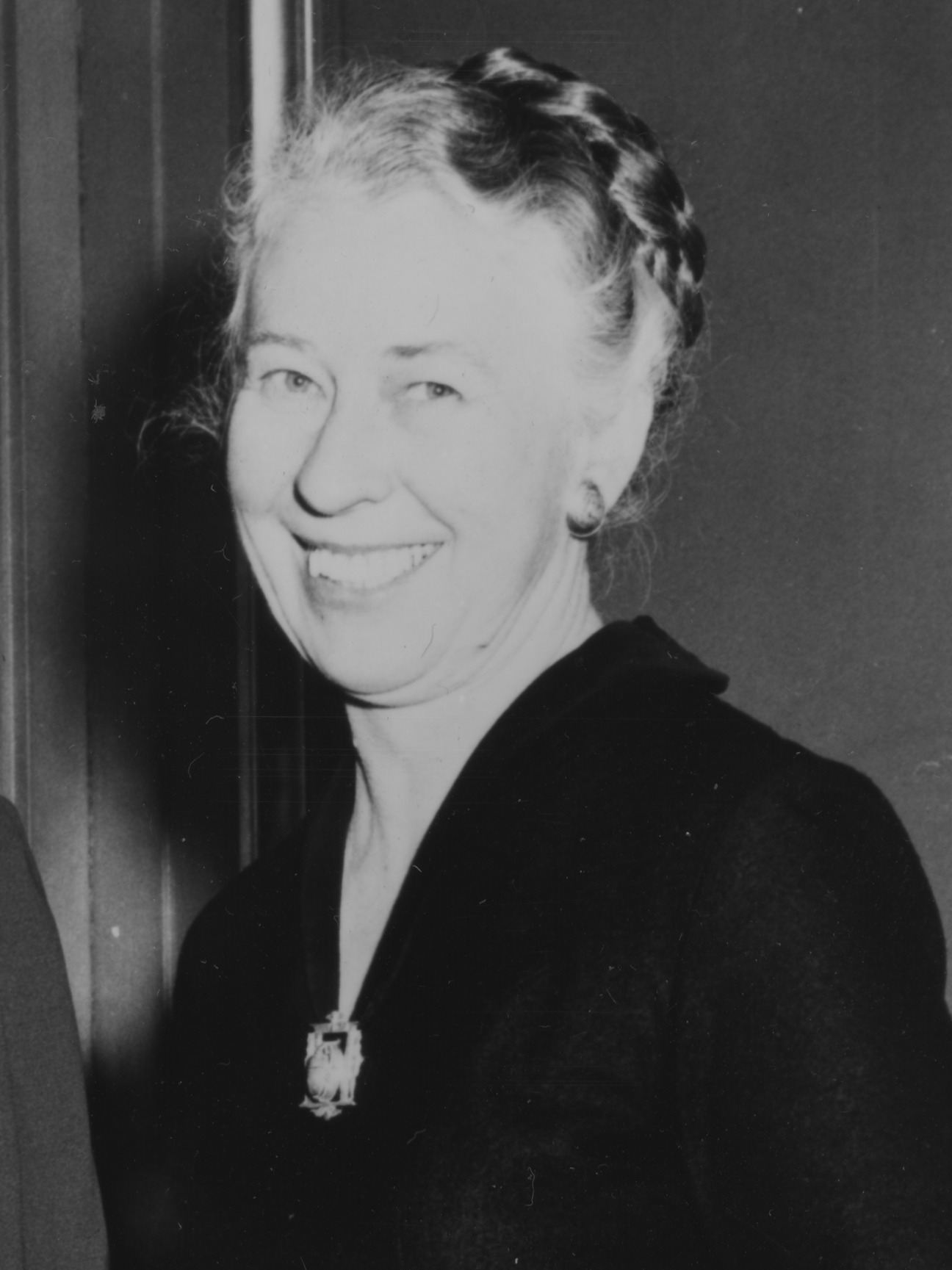
- Peterson in 1962

2nd Director of the Office of Consumer Affairs
- In office January 20, 1977 – January 20, 1981
- President: Jimmy Carter
- Preceded by: Virginia Knauer
- Succeeded by: Virginia Knauer

1st Special Assistant to the President for Consumer Affairs
- In office January 3, 1964 – May 1, 1967
- President: Lyndon Johnson
- Preceded by: Office established

Executive Vice Chairperson of the Presidential Commission on the Status of Women
- In office January 20, 1961 – November 22, 1963
- President: John F. Kennedy
- Preceded by: Office established

4th Director of the United States Women's Bureau
- In office January 20, 1961 – January 3, 1964
- President: John F. Kennedy; Lyndon Johnson
- Preceded by: Alice K. Leopold
- Succeeded by: Mary Dublin Keyserling

Personal details
- Born: Esther Eggertsen; December 9, 1906 Provo, Utah, U.S.
- Died: December 20, 1997 (aged 91) Washington
- Spouse: Oliver Peterson (m. 1932)
- Children: 4
- Education: Brigham Young University (1927); Teachers College, Columbia University (1930)

Esther Eggertsen Peterson (December 9, 1906 – December 20, 1997) was an American consumer rights activist and women's advocate.

== Background ==
The daughter of Danish immigrants, Esther Eggertsen grew up in a family who were members of the Church of Jesus Christ of Latter-Day Saints in Provo, Utah. She graduated from Brigham Young University in 1927 with a degree in physical education, and a master's from Teachers College, Columbia University, in 1930. She held several teaching positions in the 1930s, including one at the innovative Bryn Mawr Summer School for Women Workers in Industry, which brought milliners, telephone operators and garment workers onto the campus.

She moved to New York City where she married Oliver Peterson. In 1932, the two moved to Boston, where she taught at The Winsor School and volunteered at the YWCA.

== Career ==
In 1938, Peterson became a paid organizer for the American Federation of Teachers and traveled around New England. In 1944, Peterson became the first lobbyist for the National Labor Relations Board in Washington, D.C. In 1948, the State Department offered Peterson's husband a position as a diplomat in Sweden. The family returned to Washington, D.C., in 1957 and Peterson joined the Industrial Union Department of the AFL–CIO, becoming its first woman lobbyist.

She was Assistant Secretary of Labor and Director of the United States Women's Bureau under fellow Bostonian President John F. Kennedy. In 1964, President Lyndon Johnson named Peterson to the newly created post of Special Assistant for Consumer Affairs. She would later serve as President Jimmy Carter's Director of the Office of Consumer Affairs.

In 1966, Peterson was a speaker at the 35th Biennial convention for the National Association of Colored Women's Clubs.

Peterson was also Vice President for Consumer Affairs at Giant Food Corporation, where she led an initiative to introduce the first nutrition labels in 1971, and was president of the National Consumers League.

She received the Presidential Medal of Freedom in 1981. Peterson was elected to the Common Cause National Governing Board in 1982. In 1990, the American Council on Consumer Interests created the Esther Peterson Consumer Policy Forum lectureship, which is presented annually at the council's conference. She was named a delegate of the United Nations as a UNESCO representative in 1993. In that same year, Peterson was inducted into the National Women's Hall of Fame.

== Death ==
Peterson died on December 20, 1997.

== See also ==
- Great Society
- Simon P. Eggertsen Sr. House

== Sources ==
- Restless: The Memoirs of Labor and Consumer Activist Esther Peterson (Caring Publishing, 1997) ISBN 9781886450028
