= Peter Lester =

Peter Lester may refer to:

- Peter Lester (abolitionist) (c. 1814–c. 1897), American-born businessman and abolitionist
- Peter Lester (sailor) (1954–2025), New Zealand sailor and broadcaster
