= Harriet Elliott =

American academic and political scientist

Harriet Wiseman Elliott (1884–1947) was an American political scientist and academic.

== Life ==
Harriet Elliott was born in Carbondale, Illinois, on July 10, 1884. She attended Park College in Parkville, Missouri, received a bachelor's degree from Hanover College in Indiana, and a master's degree from Columbia University in New York. Elliott joined the faculty of the North Carolina State Normal and Industrial College (now The University of North Carolina at Greensboro) in 1913, as a teacher of political science. In 1935 she became Dean of Women at the school.

== Career ==
In addition to her involvement in education in North Carolina, Elliott gained prominence during the war years as the Consumer Commissioner on the Advisory Commission to the Council of National Defense (1940–1941), Chairman of the Woman's Division of the War Finance Committee (1942–1946), Deputy Director of the Office of Price Administration, and U.S. delegate to the UN Conference on Education, Science and Cultural Organization (UNESCO) in London in 1945. She was active in various political, civic and professional organizations as well as holding membership on several state committees and commissions.

== Death and legacy ==
The student union building on the UNCG campus is named for her, and the Harriet Elliott Lectures in Social Science are held in her memory.

Elliott died on August 6, 1947.
