= Richard Neville Lester =

British botanist (1937–2006)

Richard Neville Lester (13 June 1937 – 4 April 2006) was an English botanist and chemotaxonomist.

Lester was born in Birmingham. He was a student and later (1958) research assistant of Jack Hawkes and took part in potato collecting expeditions to Central America and Mexico. He was awarded a PhD in 1962 for his thesis "Immunochemical studies of the genus Solanum". He continued work on the immunotaxonomy of plants, as well as fungi and bats, at the University of Texas at Austin (until 1964), and then at the University of Kansas (1966-1968). He taught (1964-1966) at Bolton Institute of Technology. He spent a year (1968-1969) in Uganda as a lecturer in botany at Makerere University, where he developed his life-long interest in the African eggplants such as Solanum aethiopicum and Solanum macrocarpon.

From 1969 he was a lecturer at the University of Birmingham, teaching on the M.Sc. in 'Conservation and Utilization of Plant Genetic Resources'. While at Birmingham he took part in collecting trips to African for additions to the Birmingham Solanaceae collection.

He was the author or co-author of over 135 articles, mostly on the Solanaceae. Together with Hawkes and A.D. Skelding he organised the first International Solanaceae Conference in 1976. He contributed to and edited the Solanaceae Newsletter between 1977 and 1979 and was coordinator of the European Solanaceae Information Network (ESIN) from 1993 until 1996. In 1980, together with his student Peter Jaeger, he started a taxonomic revision of all African Solanum species, which remained incomplete at the time of his death.

He retired in 2000 and was later diagnosed with cancer; he died in Birmingham on 4 April 2006. He remained active in retirement and worked (2000-2005) as coordinator of EGGNET where he oversaw the transfer of the endangered Solanaceae collection at Birmingham to Nijmegen Botanical Garden, INRA Montfavet, and Valencia Polytechnic University. He also completed a conspectus of Solanum with co-author Alan Child.

The species Solanum lesteri Hawkes & Hjerting is named after him.

He married Celia Davidson in 1972 and they had two children, John and Clare.

== Selected publications ==
- The Biology and taxonomy of the Solanaceae. Hawkes, J. G., Lester, R. N., Skelding, A. D. (1979). Linnean Society of London, Academic Press. ISBN 9780123331502
- Solanaceae III : taxonomy, chemistry, evolution. Hawkes, J. G., Lester, R. N., Nee, Michael, Estrada, N. (1991). Royal Botanic Gardens, Kew. International Solanaceae Congress (3rd: 1988 : Bogota, Colombia). ISBN 9780947643317
- Solanaceae IV : advances in biology and utilization. Lester, R. N., Nee, Michael, Symon, David Eric, Jessop, John. (1999). Royal Botanic Gardens, Kew. International Solanaceae Congress (4th: 1994 Adelaide). ISBN 9781900347907
