= Richard A. Lester =

Richard Allen Lester (1908–1997) was an American economist. He was recognized for his research on wage determination and minimum wages. One of his early theories, range theory of wages, challenged the belief that laborers in similar jobs earned same wages. He argued that because wages were not fixed, raising the minimum wage wouldn't necessarily lead to lower employment levels. Lester also explored topics such as the labor movement, unemployment, and employment discrimination. His notable works include the Economics of Labor (1941), Labor and Industrial Relations (1951). During World War II, Lester held positions on the National War Labor Board, the War Manpower Commission, and the Office of the Secretary of War. He continued advising and mediating for the government throughout his career, including arbitrating labor disputes under the Railway Labor Act in 1954 and 1961.
