= Eleanor Gwinnell Coit =

American suffragist

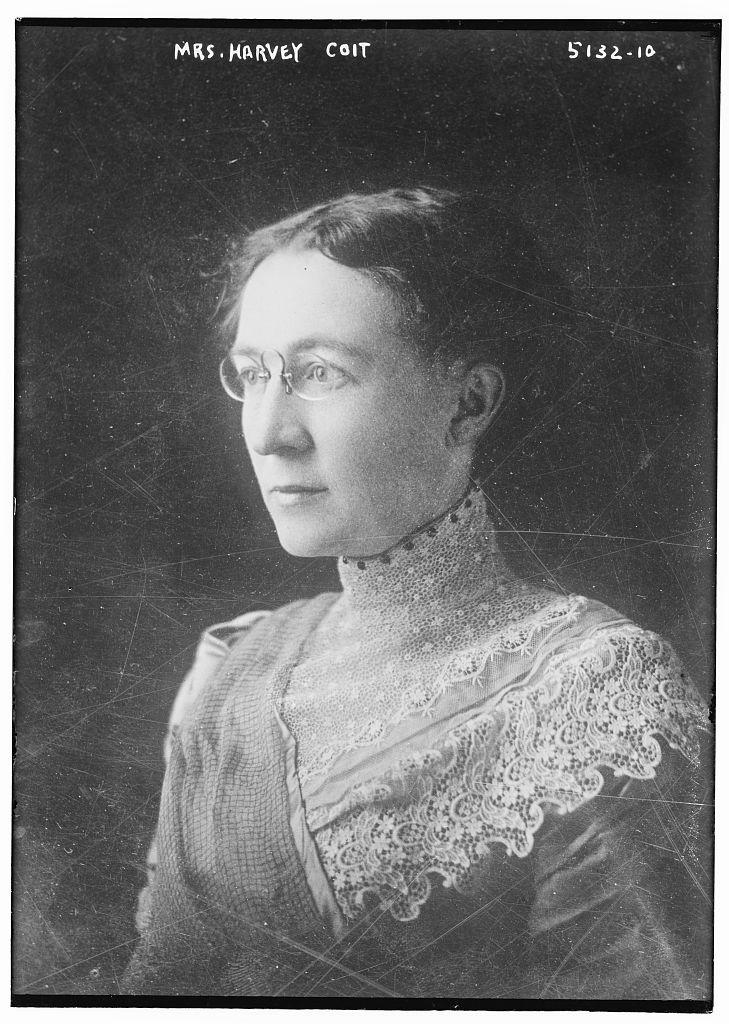
- Coit in 1915
- Born: May 6, 1894; Newark, New Jersey, U.S.
- Died: June 7, 1976 (aged 82); Hanover, New Hampshire, U.S.
- Education: B.A. in history and English, Smith College (1916); M.A. in sociology, economics, and education, Columbia University (1920)
- Occupation: Labor educator
- Known for: Leader in adult education, work with the American Labor Education Service (ALES)

Eleanor Gwinnell Coit (May 6, 1894 – June 7, 1976) was an American labor educator and leader in adult education. Born in Newark, New Jersey, she graduated from Smith College in 1916 with a degree in history and English. Coit's career began with the Young Women’s Christian Association (YWCA), where she held various roles before pursuing further studies at Columbia University. She returned to the YWCA and later became the educational secretary for the American Labor Education Service (ALES), where she served until its closure in 1962. Coit's legacy includes pioneering work in workers' education and a lifelong commitment to social justice advocacy. She died in Hanover, New Hampshire.

== Early life and education ==
Born in Newark, New Jersey, Coit was the daughter of Henry Leber Coit, a pediatrician and advocate for pure milk, and Emma Gwinnell. She attended public schools in Newark before pursuing higher education at Smith College, where she earned a Bachelor of Arts degree in history and English in 1916.

== Career ==
Following her graduation, Coit initially explored more traditional female roles but soon found her calling in social work. After her father's death in 1917, she began her career as the work and industrial secretary of the Young Women’s Christian Association (YWCA) of the Oranges in New Jersey. Coit then pursued further studies in sociology, economics, and education at Columbia University, earning her Master of Arts degree in 1920.

Coit's dedication and passion for social reform led her back to the YWCA, where she held various roles, including director and executive of industrial work in Bayonne, New Jersey, and later heading the business and industry department in Buffalo, New York. She conducted research for the Children's Bureau of the U.S. Department of Labor and the National Conference on the Christian Way of Life before returning to the YWCA as the industrial secretary for the national organization in New York in 1926.

In 1929, Coit was appointed educational secretary and director for the newly formed Affiliated Schools for Workers, later renamed the American Labor Education Service (ALES), where she served until its closure in 1962. Under her leadership, ALES expanded its focus to include a wide range of workers and developed innovative educational programs and materials.

Coit's commitment to workers' education took her abroad, where she studied advanced methods in Scandinavia and Germany during the 1930s and 1940s. She secured funding from the Ford Foundation to conduct United Nations workshops and worker exchanges after World War II.

== Legacy and later life ==
Leading the American Labor Education Service (ALES), she facilitated the creation of innovative educational initiatives, influencing worker education domestically and internationally. Despite health challenges, Coit maintained her dedication to advocacy until her death in 1976. Her commitment to social justice and informed citizenship remains influential among activists and scholars.

== Sources ==
=== Book ===
- Redmon, Sherrill (February 2000). "Coit, Eleanor Gwinnell". American National Biography. New York: Oxford University Press. doi:10.1093/anb/9780198606697.article.1501002. (subscription required)
