= Mary Florence Curran =

American politician, writer and artist (1885–1976)

- Born: 1885; North Adams, Massachusetts
- Died: 1976 (aged 90–91)
- Education: College of New Rochelle; Radcliffe College; University of Pennsylvania; Boston College
- Known for: Public Works of Art Program (PWAP)

Mary Florence Curran (1885–1976) was an artist and worker for social reform in the Philadelphia, Pennsylvania area. She managed Works Progress Administration programs for artists in Pennsylvania during the 1930s.

== Early life and education ==
Mary Florence Curran was born in 1885, to Dr. Charles J. Curran and Katherine Lally of North Adams, Massachusetts. She attended the College of New Rochelle, where she received an A.B. in English Literature with a minor in history in 1908. She went on to study at Radcliffe College in Cambridge, the University of Pennsylvania in Philadelphia and Boston College. She took classes in creative writing and psychology, contemporary painting and sculpture, and the history of art.

== Career ==
She was an influential local figure in North Adams, in the Berkshires, Massachusetts, due to her founding of the first working girl's club there.

By the fall of 1921, she accepted the position of Executive Director of the Eastern Pennsylvania Section of the National League of Girls' Clubs. She developed the clubs so much that by 1927 the league started attracting men and they changed their name to the New Students League. In an oral history interview with Emlen Etting in 1988, Curran is described as "very active, she was very dedicated to her work."

The New Students League became a gallery. Etting described Curran's work with the gallery as, "hipped on doing things for starving artists". Their first exhibition, in 1927, featured the mural work of Thomas Hart Benton. In 1928 the New Students League held the First Philadelphia Independent Artists' Exhibition, which showed artists such as George Biddle, Charles Demuth, Franklin Watkins, Thomas Hart Benton, Julian Levi, and Leon Kelly. As well the Little Gallery of Contemporary Art was founded.

Curran worked with Fiske Kimball, the Director of the Philadelphia Museum of Art, to administer the Public Works of Art Program (PWAP), part of the Civil Works Administration (CWA). They oversaw the implementation and assignment of works to artists.

Later in her career, Curran wrote for the Journal of Education, the oldest education journal in the United States.

As late as age 73 Curran exhibited a drawing, in an annual show in the Berkshires (Massachusetts). Her work Sleeping was reviewed by a local paper as "certainly one of the best items in the show, with a close communion of the body with the earth." Curran died in 1976.
