= Hilda Worthington Smith =

American educator, poet

- Born: June 19, 1888; New York City, New York
- Died: March 3, 1984 (aged 95); Washington, D.C.
- Other name: "Jane" (nickname)
- Occupation: educator
- Known for: Bryn Mawr Summer School for Women Workers in Industry/She-She-She Camps

Hilda Worthington Smith (June 19, 1888 – March 3, 1984) was an American labor educator, social worker, and poet. She is best known for her roles as first Director of the Bryn Mawr Summer School for Women Workers in Industry and as a co-founder of the Affiliated Schools for Workers (later known as the American Labor Education Service), although she also had a long career in government service supporting education for underserved groups including women, laborers, African-Americans and the elderly.

== Early life and education ==
Hilda Worthington Smith, nicknamed "Jane", was born on June 19, 1888, in New York City, the firstborn of three children of John Jewell and Mary Helen (née Hall) Smith. The Smith family spent its summers in West Park, New York, where young Hilda would later establish two resident workers' schools in the 1930s. The rest of the year was spent in their home near Central Park where Hilda and her younger sister (Helen Hall Smith; 1892–1971), and her younger brother (Jewell Kellogg Smith; 1890–1956), created an imaginary world described in her 1934 essay, "A Post Office in Fairyland". Her father's invention of a steamheating system, which heated many of the early office buildings of New York, provided the family with a handsome fortune.

She attended Bryn Mawr College between 1906 and 1910 for her undergraduate degree, during which she was elected to lead the student body as president of the Self Government Association. Worthington Smith remained at Bryn Mawr the following year and left in 1911 with a master's degree in ethics and psychology, after which she received a second graduate degree from the New York School of Philanthropy (which exists currently as the Columbia University School of Social Work).

When she was twenty-five years old she returned to Bryn Mawr at the invitation of President of the college, M. Carey Thomas, to oversee a residence hall as a Warden, and began to teach an informal class on social work at the request of a group of undergraduates in which she introduced the concepts of child welfare, family rehabilitation, delinquency, immigration, and housing. She returned to her studies at the School of Philanthropy in 1914 and soon established a community center for youth in New York City that served many boys of Irish, Italian, and African American descent, which she ran until Carey Thomas offered her the position of Acting Dean in 1919.

During the two years she served as Dean, her interest in workers' education was already becoming an area of active pursuit: in addition to her duties mentoring undergraduate students and administering college programs, Smith took the initiative to arrange night classes for the black college gardeners and service employees.

== The Bryn Mawr Summer School for Women Workers in Industry ==
A pivotal moment in Worthington Smith's career came in 1921, when President Carey Thomas asked her to head the Bryn Mawr Summer School for Women Workers in Industry, a brand new initiative that Thomas envisioned and set into motion after visiting Workers' Educational Association programs in England.

Although Thomas was the original visionary of the school, Worthington Smith is credited with developing it into the successful program that it became and setting the example for a host of other similar programs that were founded in its image, including the Wisconsin Summer School, Barnard Summer School, Vineyard Shore School, Southern Summer School, and the coeducational Hudson Shore Labor School.

The Summer School was a residential program on the campus of Bryn Mawr College that operated for 8 weeks in the summer every year (except for 1935) between 1921 and 1938, hosting and educating female factory workers from all over the country who numbered approximately 1700 over the duration of the initiative. Money was raised for scholarships to support the students, who were between the ages of 18 and 35 and came from diverse backgrounds including different nationalities, races, religions, industries, non-unionized and union affiliations. About 100 women attended each year that the school operated, gathering to live, eat, and sleep together while they studied a variety of liberal arts subjects with distinguished faculty drawn from local institutions.

The object of the school, as stated in prospectus and distributed to a variety of news outlets, was "to offer young women of character and ability a fuller education and an opportunity to study liberal subjects in order that they might widen their influence in the industrial world, help in the coming social reconstruction and increase the happiness and usefulness of their own lives." The focus was therefore on giving women the knowledge and tools to exercise agency in their lives, and to become leaders in their communities in a new era of social change.

In 1933, Harry Hopkins, as adviser to FDR and head of the FERA, borrowed Ms. Smith to set up an educational program for the Administration, which in 1937 became the W.P.A.'s Workers Education Service. As FDR's Educational Specialist, She created and ran multiple programs; one such program employed out-of-work teachers, whose graduates include Hubert H. Humphrey, a future vice president under LBJ. Another set up the She-She-She Camps for unemployed women, ER's bid to place women in the program of Civilian Conservation Corps camps for men, and to provide education and housing for unemployed youth.

== Later career and life ==
The workers' education movement gained momentum, with Worthington Smith playing an active and significant role. In addition to the schools that she was directly involved in founding (such as the Hudson Shore Labor School, which was established on the site of her family home on the Hudson River), she served on the advisory committees of many such initiatives. She also established and served as first Director of the Affiliated Schools for Workers (1927–1939), later known as the American Labor Education Service (1939–1962).

The later years of Worthington Smith's career were dominated by federal appointments, listed here:

- Specialist in Workers' Education for the Federal Emergency Relief Administration, 1933–1943
- Director of the Workers' Service Program for the Works Progress Administration 1939–1943
- Consultant in Labor Education, 1943
- Federal Public Housing Authority as Chief of the Project Services Section 1943–1945
- Chairman of the National Committee for the Extension of Labor Education 1945–1951
- Member of the New York State Adult Education Bureau (1957 to 1959)
- Consultant for the Connecticut State Commission for Services to Elderly Persons from 1959 to 1961.
- Consultant for the Training Division of the Community Action Program of the Office of Economic Opportunity, 1965

Worthington Smith retired at the age of 83 to focus on various writing projects related to her life experiences and career, including a narrative of her seven years with the Office of Economic Opportunity and a revised and expanded version of her autobiography, Opening Vistas in Workers' Education, which was self-published in 1978.

In addition to these publications, Worthington Smith's poetry was published in songbooks, periodicals, and in three printed volumes: Castle of Dream (1910) and Poems (1964), both privately printed, and Selected Poems (1977). She died of leukemia, aged 95, on March 3, 1984, in Washington, D.C.

== Life philosophy ==
To sum up Jane's life a story done in 1984 for The New York Times does come close to sewing 1919 to 1983 into a fine embroidery. The author noted that in 1937 the programs Smith initiated but couldn't in 1933 call by name became the W.P.A.'s Workers Education Service. When tasked by Harry Hopkins to be education specialist, she already knew what she wanted.

Smith also wanted to teach "workers' education", a term that had a strong communist association. She related years later, "I hardly dared mention it because it was so unpopular."

Workers'education was ... "unusual because it involved three groups virtually ignored at the time: women, blue collar workers, and blacks.."—Priscilla Van Tassel, New York Times, June 24, 1984, NJ5. (Caption for HWSmith picture) from the interview for the story in the NYTimes

"And what is workers' education? I think the first thing is to say what workers' education is and what it is not. I'd like to say, first, it is not vocational education. Many people think that that is what it is; it's not trade training for workers. That's entirely separate, should supplement workers' education and go along with it. But it is not the same thing. Workers' education is a specialized branch of adult education. It covers in general the economic and labor problems related to the experience of industrial workers, office workers, farmers, anything that touches the economic field. It is also and usually supplemented with much work in English, with elementary science, social psychology, with history, with a background of life in the United States. It touches: employers' problems, trade union problems, the worker in the community as citizen, the government's relation to industry and to the labor movement." Interview with Hilda Worthington Smith, Franklin D. Roosevelt Library, Hyde Park, NY, October 17, 1963

== Published works ==
Worthington Smith's published works include:

- Castle of Dream. Smith, 1910. (Full text on Internet Archive.)
- Women Workers at the Bryn Mawr Summer School. New York City : Affiliated Summer Schools for Women Workers in Industry and American Association for Adult Education, 1929.
- Poems. Washington : Merkle Press, 1964.
- Selected Poems. New York: Institute for Education and Research on Women and Work, New York State School of Industrial and Labor Relations, Cornell University, 1977.
- Opening Vistas in Workers' Education: an autobiography. Smith, 1978.

== See also ==
- Louise Leonard McLaren
- M. Carey Thomas
