= Westlawn Cemetery =

Jewish cemetery in Cook County, Illinois

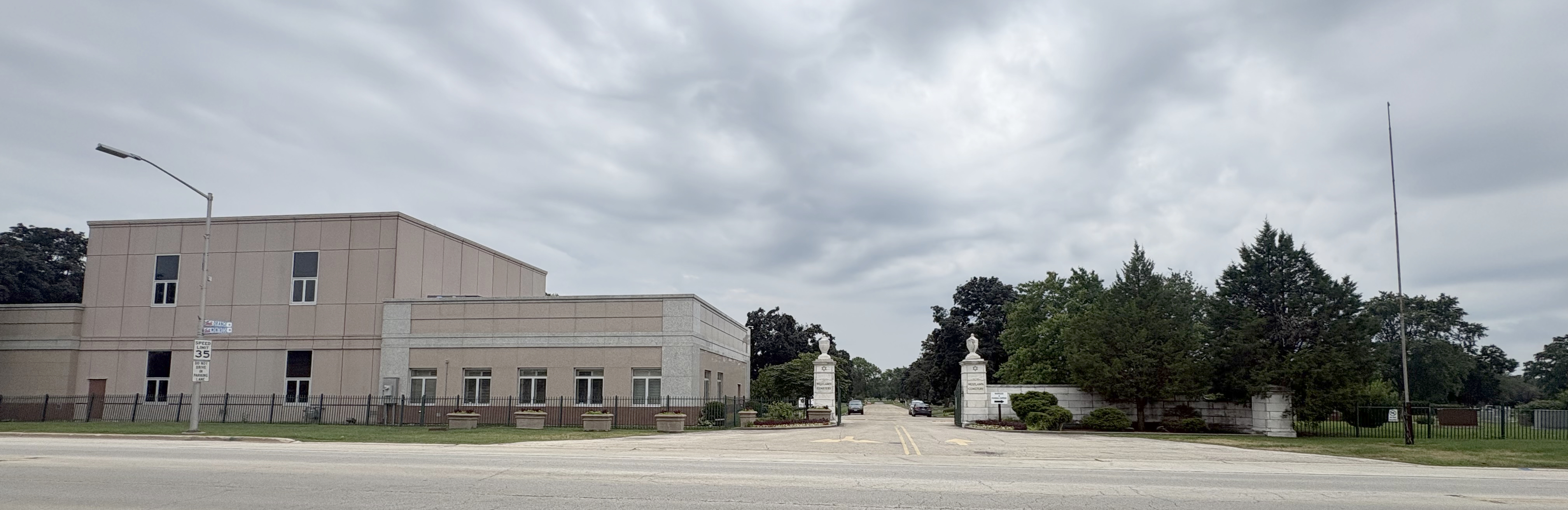
- Interactive map of Westlawn Cemetery

Details
- Established: 1937
- Location: Norridge, Illinois
- Country: United States
- Coordinates: 41°57′28″N 87°49′38″W
- Type: Public
- Style: Jewish cemetery
- Size: 72 acres (29 ha)
- No. of interments: 49,000
- Website: Official website
- Find a Grave: Westlawn Cemetery

Westlawn Cemetery is a Jewish cemetery located in Norridge, a suburb of Chicago in Illinois. The cemetery covers 72 acres (29 ha) and roughly 46,000 people are buried there.

== Notable interments ==
- Jeffrey Barron, gag writer for Bob Hope, Alan King, Bill Cosby.
- Leonard S. Chess, record company executive
- Virginia Lee Corbin, actress
- Sandy Dvore, artist
- Mike Nussbaum, actor
- Susan Nussbaum, actress and playwright
- Richard Elrod, jurist, sheriff, and legislator
- Jack Ruby, convicted of the murder of Lee Harvey Oswald, who at the time was under arrest for the assassination of US President John F. Kennedy
  (His conviction was later reversed. He died awaiting a new trial, still legally presumed innocent.)
- Abe Saperstein, creator of the Savoy Big Five, precursor of the Harlem Globetrotters
- Harry Sawyer, Jewish-American organized crime boss based in the Twin Cities, co-conspirator and protector of the Dillinger and Barker-Karpis Gangs.
- Shel Silverstein, poet, author, satirist, and cartoonist
- Gene Siskel, film critic

== Vandalism ==
Westlawn was the site of gravestone desecration in January 2008. At least 57 tombstones were defaced with anti-Semitic slogans. Using white and blue spray paint, the vandal drew swastikas and slurs on tombstones in a western section of the cemetery.

A 21-year-old Polish immigrant male was charged with the crime in February 2008. He has been directly linked by police to a neo-Nazi organization in the Chicago area and he was a member of the National Socialist Movement. He was convicted on two charges of felony vandalism and sentenced to 7 years in prison, the maximum sentence.
