= War Manpower Commission =

US government agency during World War II

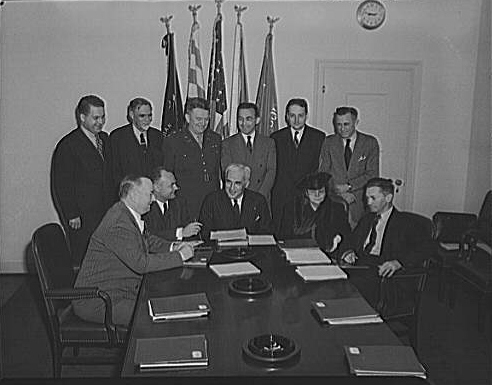
Chairman Paul V. McNutt opens the first meeting of the War Manpower Commission, May 6, 1942.

The War Manpower Commission was a World War II agency of the United States government charged with planning to balance the labor needs of agriculture, industry and the armed forces.

== History ==
The Commission was created by President Franklin D. Roosevelt in Executive Order 9139 of April 18, 1942. Its chairman was Paul V. McNutt, head of the Federal Security Agency. In this Executive Order, the War Manpower Commission was headed by the Federal Security Administrator as Chairman, and consisted of representatives from the Department of War, the Department of the Navy, the Department of Agriculture, the Department of Labor, the War Production Board, the Labor Production Division of the War Production Board, the Selective Service System, and the United States Civil Service Commission to ensure effective mobilization of manpower in the post-war era.

Executive Order 9279, dated December 5, 1942, transferred the Selective Service System to the War Manpower Commission. However, a year later it was made a separate agency directly responsible to the President.

=== Women's Advisory Committee ===
McNutt appointed all men to his labor advisory committee, despite the pleas of Women's Bureau director, Mary Anderson, to have women represented. According to a 1953 Women's Bureau Bulletin by the United States secretary of labor Martin Patrick Durkin, the Women's Advisory Committee was initially considered after National Defense Advisory Commission member Sidney Hillman "recognized the need for women's point of view on problems relating to women workers". After repeated refusals to include women in his labor advisory committee, McNutt accepted an official proposal from the National Federation of Business and Professional Women's Clubs.

The Women's Advisory Committee was appointed by Administrative Order No. 22 of the War Manpower Commission on August 31, 1942. Thirteen prominent women professionals, business executives, journalists, educators and organizational presidents were appointed to serve on the Committee.

However, many women workers' groups, whilst not formally opposing the Committee, took Anderson's stance that the body would be severely limited in its effectiveness, especially as it would lack the ability to actually determine policy. Perhaps the most notable organisation with this stance was the National Women's Trade Union League. Additionally, McNutt did not provide a budget and Committee members were not paid.

== Gallery ==
Paul V. McNutt, head of the War Manpower Commission

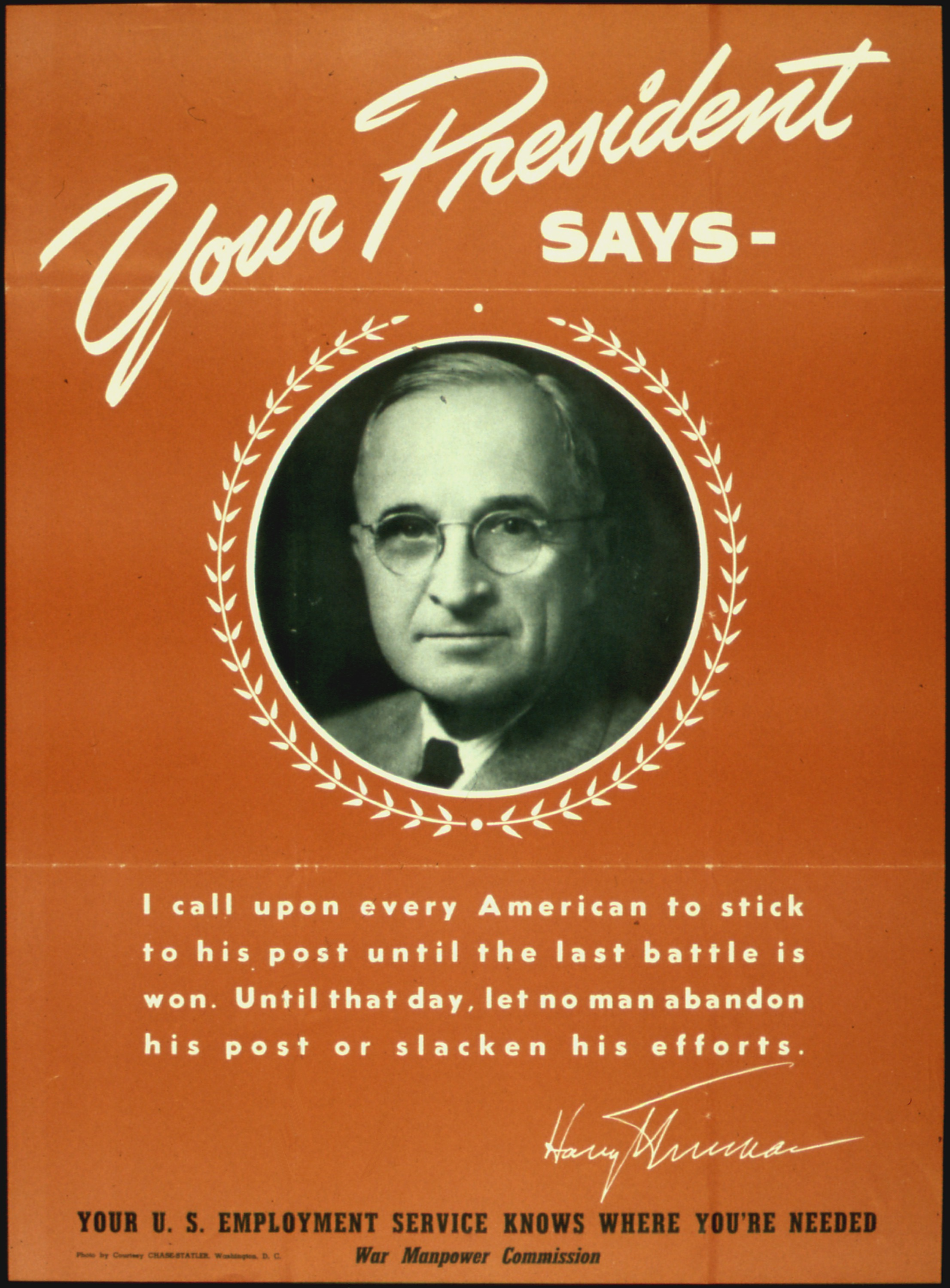
President Truman calling on workers to stay on the job

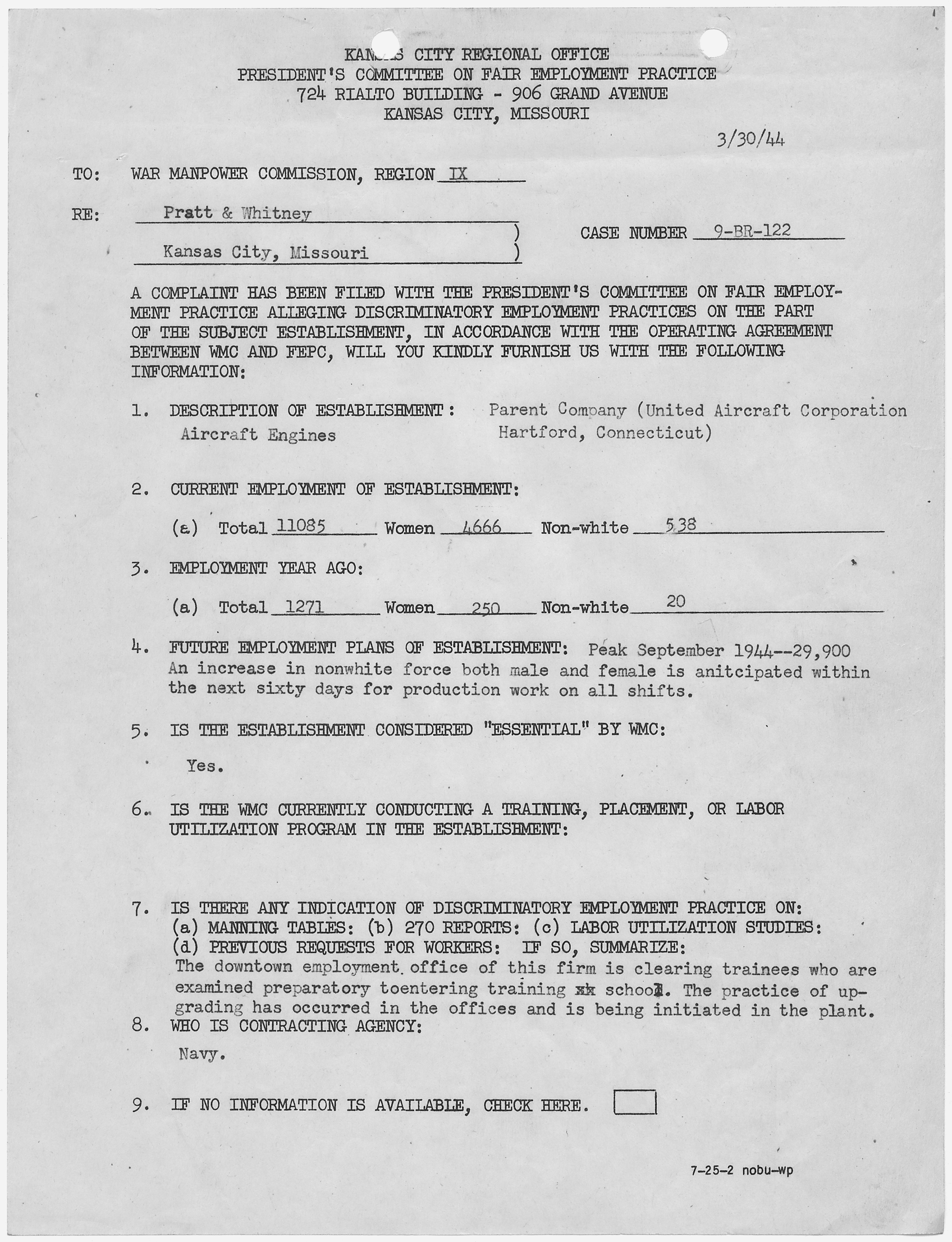
War Manpower Commission and employment discrimination complaint against aircraft engine manufacturer Pratt & Whitney

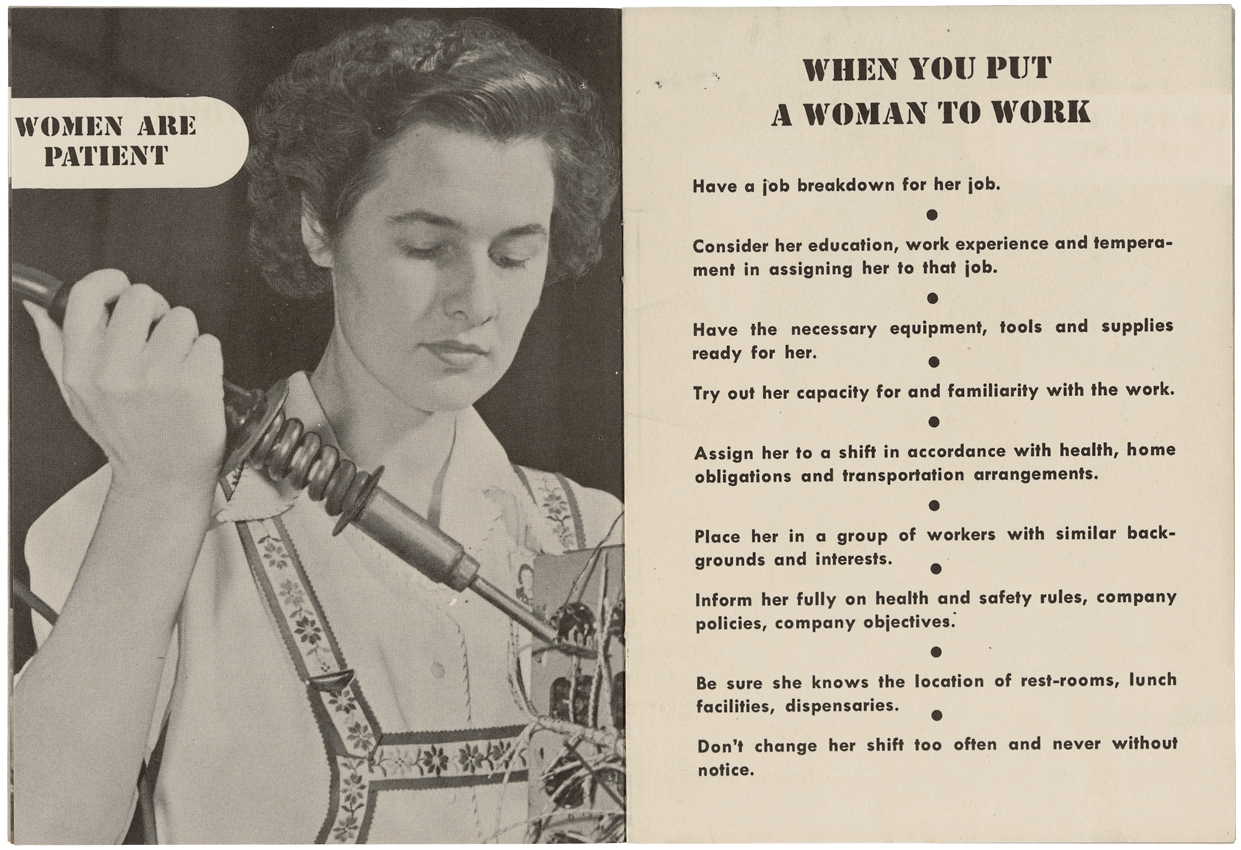
Page from Women Want to "Get It Over"
