= Elizabeth Duncan Koontz =

American educator (1919–1989)

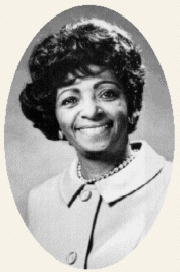

6th Director of the United States Women's Bureau
- In office 1969–1973
- President: Richard Nixon
- Preceded by: Mary Dublin Keyserling
- Succeeded by: Carmen Rosa Maymi

Personal details
- Born: June 3, 1919 Salisbury, North Carolina
- Died: January 6, 1989 (aged 69) Salisbury, North Carolina

Elizabeth Duncan Koontz (June 3, 1919 – January 6, 1989) was an American figure in education, civil rights and the women's movement. She was the first African-American president of the National Education Association and the first African-American director of the United States Department of Labor Women's Bureau.

== Early life and education ==
Elizabeth (Libby) Duncan was born on June 3, 1919, in Salisbury, North Carolina. She was the youngest of seven children, who were all able to read and write at seven years old. Her parents, Samuel E. Duncan and Lena Bell (Jordan) Duncan, wanted to make sure their children were all well-educated, despite the institutional segregation at the time. Her father was a high school principal at Dunbar High School, located in East Spencer, NC. Samuel also taught at Livingstone College, and served as the sixth president at Livingstone College. He died when Elizabeth was nine years old. Her mother, Lena Duncan was an elementary teacher at Dunbar Elementary School. Lena also taught illiterate adults how to read with Elizabeth's help. Her brother Samuel later served as president of Livingston College in Salisbury after their father did. Her other brother, John, was the first African-American commissioner of the District of Columbia. Koontz attended segregated schools in Salisbury and graduated as salutatorian from Price High School in 1935. She graduated with a BA in English and elementary education in 1938 from Livingstone College. In 1941, she earned her master's degree from Atlanta University. She later studied at Columbia University, Indiana University, and North Carolina College. Elizabeth Duncan married fellow teacher Harry Koontz in 1947. They had no children together. Harry later died in 1986. In 1965, Elizabeth became an honorary member of Zeta Phi Beta sorority.

== Career ==
Koontz' first teaching job was a fourth-grade teacher at Harnett County Training School in Dunn, North Carolina working with special needs students. The school owned a boarding house for teachers and staff, but Koontz discovered that the principal was charging too much for board. She organized teachers to protest and was fired from that position. She later became a special education teacher at Price High School in Salisbury, North Carolina.

She was a lifelong member of the National Education Association and served as President of its largest department, the Association of Classroom Teachers during the 1965-66 school year. In 1968, she became the first black president of the National Education Association. During her presidency, she took the conservative and rural-oriented organization in a more liberal direction, notably establishing the Human and Civil Rights Division of the NEA. The Division was responsible for a variety of issues affecting minority education.

She was a member of the national Advisory Council of the Education of Disadvantaged children in 1965, during President Lyndon B. Johnson’s term and served as Assistant Secretary for the Coordination of Nutrition Programs in the North Carolina Department of Human Resources. In 1969, she was appointed by Richard Nixon as the first African-American director of the United States Department of Labor Women's Bureau. As the head of the Bureau, Koontz helped to: share research and expertise with women abroad; address and eliminate discrimination against women and minorities in the workforce; identify discriminatory provisions in State statutes; support and fight for passage of the proposed Equal Rights Amendment (ERA). In advocating for equal pay for women, she stated, “I believe that what women must have is freedom–the freedom to choose different life styles, the freedom to fulfill the best that is in them. She was a U.S. Delegate to the United Nations Commission on the Status of Women in 1975 and counselor to the Secretary of Labor on women's programs.

Koontz was the assistant state school superintendent in North Carolina in 1975 until she retired in 1982. She served on various boards including as vice chairman of the Commission on North Carolina Year 2000, as a trustee Educational Testing Service in Princeton, N.J., the University of North Carolina at Charlotte, and Pfeiffer College.

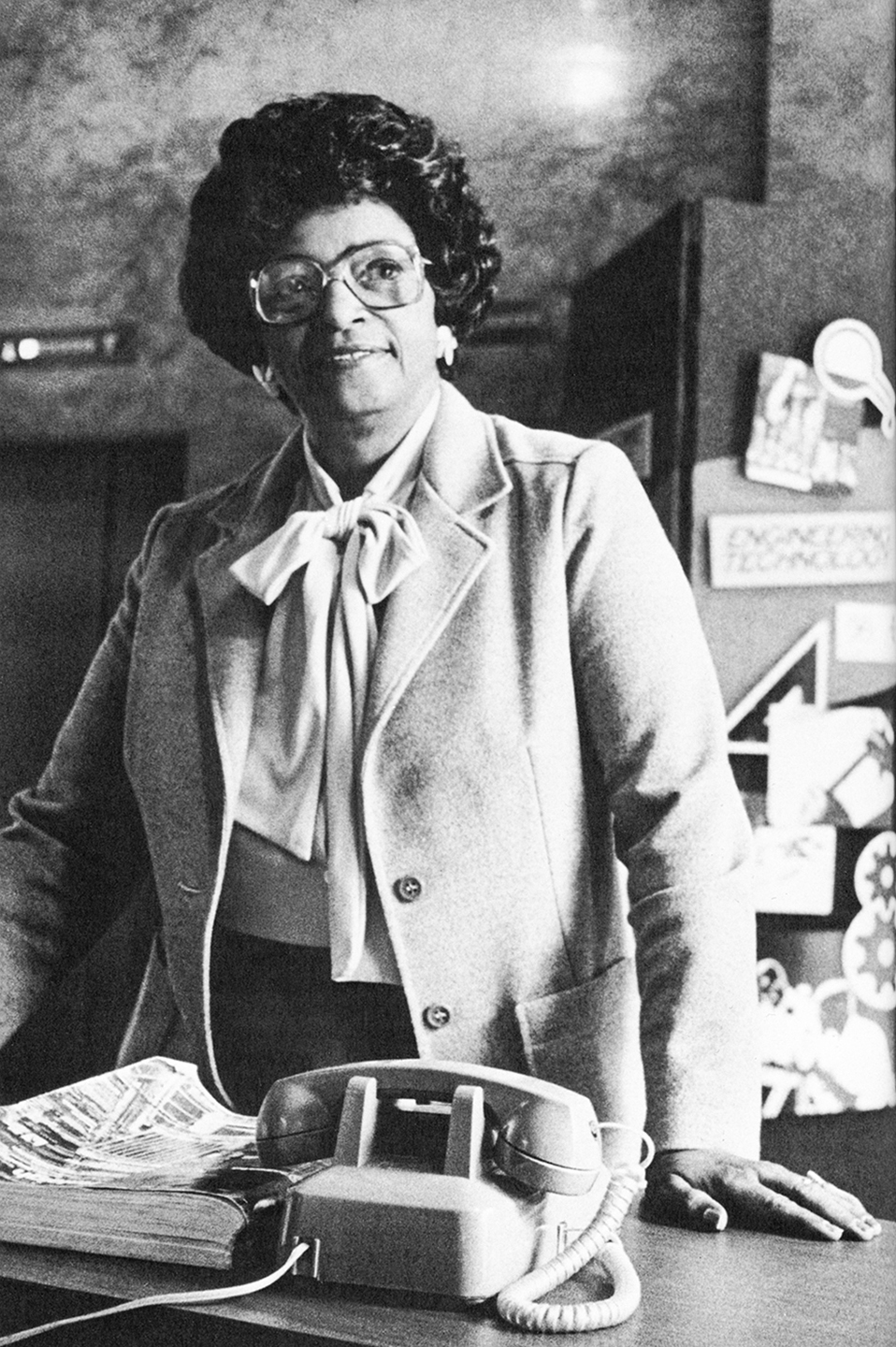
Elizabeth Duncan Koontz photographed by Lynn Gilbert

She died from a heart attack in her home on January 6, 1989.

== Legacy ==
The Salisbury Human Relations Council (HRC) now awards the "Elizabeth Duncan Koontz Humanitarian Award" every year in remembrance of Koontz. It is awarded to people or groups are a part of the Salisbury community and have made great contributions to community relations. Elizabeth Duncan Koontz Elementary School, which opened in 2006 in Salisbury, is named in her honor.

Throughout her career, she pushed for equality of gender and race. In her 1968 acceptance speech for NEA president, she asked educators “to make use of their united power to bring about change... that educators ... men and women ... young and old ... black and white ... stand together.” Koontz aimed to get rid of the phrase "women's work," as that capped the potential of women.

== Awards and honors ==
- Honorary Doctorate of Science in Education, Northeastern University, 1969
- Honorary Doctor of Pedagogy, Bryant University, 1969
- Honorary Doctorate of Laws, Indiana University, 1974
- North Carolina Award for Public Service, 1977
