= Tom of Your Life =

- Directed by: Jeremy Sklar
- Written by: Jeremy Sklar
- Produced by: James Sharpe
- Starring: Jeremy Sklar; Baize Buzan; Dominic Rescigno; Joshua Paul; Judah Abner Paul
- Cinematography: Christopher Rejano
- Music by: Jeremy Sklar
- Production company: Satori!Studios
- Distributed by: Gravitas Ventures
- Release dates: 6 March 2020 (Cinequest Film & Creativity Festival); 1 September 2020 (US)
- Running time: 93 minutes
- Country: United States
- Language: English

Tom of Your Life is a 2020 American comedy-drama film directed by Jeremy Sklar, starring Jeremy Sklar, Baize Buzan, Dominic Rescigno, Joshua Paul and Judah Abner Paul. It was Mike Nussbaum’s last film role before his death in 2023.

== Cast ==
- Baize Buzan as Jess
- Levi Emerson Paul as Tom (4)
- Judah Abner Paul as Tom (8)
- Joshua Paul as Tom (12)
- Dominic Rescigno as Tom (20s)
- Jeremy Sklar as Tom (28-104)
- James Sharpe as Carl
- Paul Tigue as Dennis
- Mike Nussbaum as Father McMurphy
- Bob Rusch as Grabowski
- Michael Saad as Socrates
- Chuck Sklar as Schmitty
- Annabel Steven as Madelyn
- Janelle James as Agent Parker
- Kara Zediker as Ana

== Reception ==
Richard Roeper of Chicago Sun-Times rated the film 3.5 stars out of 4 and wrote that "each stop on this unique journey is handled with humor and warmth and grace."

Rob Rector of Film Threat gave the film a score of 8.5/10 and wrote that it is "captured and rendered stunningly" while Buzan is "outstanding, providing authentic, frantic frailty to her role as Jess".
