= Karen Nussbaum =

American labor leader (born 1950)

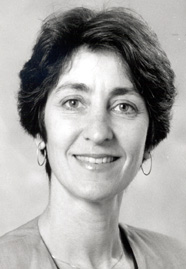

13th Director of the United States Women's Bureau
- In office 1993–1996
- Preceded by: Elsie Vartanian
- Succeeded by: Irasema Garza

Personal details
- Born: May 25, 1950 (age 76) Chicago, Illinois, U.S.
- Spouse: Ira Arlook
- Children: Jack Nussbaum; Gene Nussbaum; Eleanor Nussbaum
- Parent: Mike Nussbaum (father)
- Relatives: Susan Nussbaum (sister)
- Education: Goddard College (BA)

Karen Nussbaum (born April 25, 1950) is an American labor leader and founding director of Working America. Nussbaum was born in Chicago where her mother, Annette Brenner Nussbaum, was a publicist, and her father, Myron "Mike" Nussbaum, was an exterminator, actor, and director. Her parents were active in the anti-Vietnam movement and worked to bring speakers to their community of Highland Park in Chicago including Staughton Lynd. During this time, the family was also receiving hate mail from the local John Birch Society. She enrolled in the University of Chicago in 1968 but dropped out to move to Boston and work in the anti-Vietnam movement. In 1975, she earned a B.A. from Goddard College. While in Boston, she began working as a clerical worker at Harvard where she was exposed to inequalities in the workplace for female office workers.

== Biography ==
=== Working with 9to5 ===
In 1972, she co-founded 9to5: Organization for Women Office Workers with Ellen Cassedy. 9to5 is an organization that addressed issues female office workers faced, such as sexual harassment. Women became a driving force during the labor movement by leading woman-dominated unions and associations. Female unionists and feminists came together during the 9to5 movement which benefitted both organizations. The labor movement gained female workers and support while the feminists became a much stronger and a recognized feminist union. The 9to5 organization eventually helped create a labor union for female office workers in 1975. As a radical activist, Nussbaum realized that her job in life was to organize powerful unions for groups overlooked by the labor movement. In 1977, 9to5 Boston merged with Cleveland Women Working (est. 1975 primarily by Helen Williams) to create the Cleveland-based Working Women Organizing Project. Based in Cleveland from 1977 to 1993, the national organization was a coalition of like-minded associations and was headed by Nussbaum. (The name was later changed to 9to5: National Association of Women Office Workers.) In 1978, Karen Nussbaum became the director. In 1981, 9to5 worked as a partner with the Service Employees International Union (SEIU) known as District 925. During the partnership with the union, she served as director from 1981 to 1993.

=== Later work ===
During the Clinton Administration, Nussbaum served as the director of the Women's Bureau in the United States Department of Labor from 1993 to 1996. During this time, Nussbaum noticed that women's health problems due to the workplace often go unreported and unnoticed. Most reported workplace hazards for women are identified as fertility issues, although there are few regulations to protect female workers from fertility hazards. Nussbaum states that she "plans to work closely with the Occupational Safety and Health Administration (OSHA) " to act as an advocate for workplace safety on a gender-specific basis. As director of the Women's Bureau, she sent out surveys to working women titled, Working Women Count!, which described the things that working women in the U.S. want and what they are looking to the Administration for. The survey entailed questions asking working women about their jobs where she found a similarity among the complaints. Nussbaum hopes to educate women about their workplace rights regarding the Pregnancy Discrimination Act, Civil Rights Act, and the Family and Medical Leave Act.

Later on in life, Nussbaum involved herself with the Washington D.C.–based labor federation AFL–CIO. In 1996 she served as the head of the AFL-CIO's new Working Women's Department. During her time, a study by her group found that nearly half of the wage gap between men and women is accredited to discrimination. She stated, "One of the biggest reasons for the narrowing of the gap was that many high-paying manufacturing jobs held by men have gone overseas".

=== Awards and achievements ===
- She was inducted into the Ohio Women's Hall of Fame in 1984
- Founding Director of Working America
- Co-founded the 9to5 movement
- Co-founded the AFL-CIO
- Director of the Women's Bureau
- “9to5: The Working Women’s Guide to Office Survival” by Ellen Cassedy and Karen Nussbaum, Penguin Books, 1983
- “Solutions for the New Workforce” by John Sweeney and Karen Nussbaum, Seven Locks Press, 1989
- Chapter in “The Sex of Class”, edited by Dorothy Sue Cobble, ILR Press 2007. “Working Women’s Insurgent Consciousness"
- A member of "Working America" Foundation, the organization is AFL-CIO, and is designed to help the labors in non-government organizations. Karen's works feature women, labor, politics, and culture!

== Bibliography ==
- "Karen Nussbaum; Transcript (1 Pdf), Nov. 16, 2006 | ArchivesSpace@Wayne". archives.wayne.edu. Retrieved 2023-03-24.
- "Census data reports narrowing gender wage gap". Journal Record. Oklahoma City. 5 June 2002. ProQuest 259421415.
- "9TO5, NATIONAL ASSN. OF WORKING WOMEN". Encyclopedia of Cleveland History | Case Western Reserve University. 2019-05-31.
- Windham, Lane (1 September 2015). "'A Sense of Possibility and a Belief in Collective Power': A Labor Strategy Talk with Karen Nussbaum". Labor. 12 (3): 35–51. doi:10.1215/15476715-2920388.

== See also ==
- 9to5, National Association of Working Women
- Karen Nussbaum website
