= Working America =

Political organizing arm of the AFL–CIO

- Founded: 2003
- Headquarters: Washington, D.C.
- Location: United States
- Members: 5 million
- Key people: Matt Morrison, executive director
- Affiliations: AFL–CIO
- Website: workingamerica.org

Working America is the political organizing arm of the AFL–CIO. Its membership is made up of non-union individuals. It is the largest non-employer based affiliate union and workers' group in the United States, with a self-reported membership of 5 million individuals. Working America advocates for progressive policy issues. The organization recruits people in working-class neighborhoods on their doorsteps in an effort to persuade them to support labor-backed candidates at election time.

== Overview ==
The organization started as a two-state pilot project of the AFL–CIO in 2003. The organization was launched nationally that fall, as a national directly affiliated labor union that would "not be employment-based or workplace-based in any way." Instead, it was to be a "neighborhood-based, membership organization affiliated with the labor movement... [that] will give working Americans who do not belong to unions the platform and the tools to join together and have their voices heard... canvassers will go door-to-door to educate, recruit members, and mobilize working families around important national, state, and local issues such as jobs, health care, and education". The organization's founding director was Karen Nussbaum.

In October 2005, the organization announced that it had enrolled 1 million members. It reported a membership of 2.5 million by the fall of 2008. As of October 2024, they report a membership of 5 million.

== Campaigns ==
Working America undertook its first nationwide activities in the 2004 U.S. presidential election. It organized a "Show Us The Jobs" bus tour of workers throughout the Midwest. The tour was critical of President George W. Bush's policies.

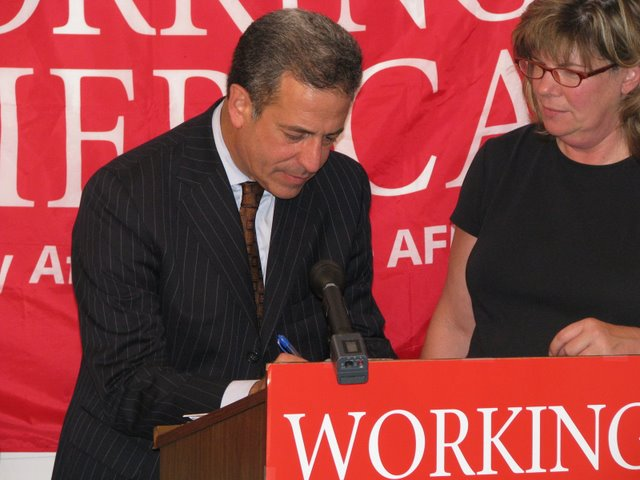
Senator Russ Feingold signing up as a member of Working America on August 4, 2008

Working America was active in the 2006 midterm congressional elections. Working America activists were credited by the press and Democrats for helping to deliver federal and state victories in Ohio and Pennsylvania.

In 2007, Working America began a campaign to build support for universal health care. The group established a "Health Care Hustle" website on which consumers could post stories about how lack of health insurance or under-insurance led to significant financial, health or other problems. Working America promised to launch a campaign against the organization or corporation which received the most "horror stories." The effort built upon a previous campaign by Working America in mid-2006 in which the organization asked the public to submit stories about "bad bosses."

In 2015, Working America led a "massive get-out-the-vote effort" to elect Democrat Jack Conway as Governor of Kentucky. Conway was defeated by Republican Matt Bevin.

== Policy positions ==
Working America opposes social security privatization. It supports the Affordable Care Act and Medicaid expansion. The organization advocates for an increased minimum wage and universal health care.
