= Things Change (film) =

1988 American drama film by David Mamet

- Theatrical release poster
- Directed by: David Mamet
- Written by: David Mamet; Shel Silverstein
- Produced by: Michael Hausman
- Starring: Don Ameche; Joe Mantegna; Robert Prosky
- Cinematography: Juan Ruiz Anchía
- Music by: Alaric Jans
- Distributed by: Columbia Pictures
- Release dates: August 31, 1988 (Venice Film Festival); October 21, 1988 (United States)
- Running time: 100 minutes
- Country: United States
- Language: English
- Box office: $3,527,886

Things Change is a 1988 American comedy-drama film directed by David Mamet and starring Joe Mantegna and Don Ameche. It was co-written by Mamet and Shel Silverstein.

== Plot ==
Gino, a humble shoe-shiner in Chicago, is approached by Mafia Don "Mr. Green", who offers him a large sum of money to take the blame for a murder committed by another gangster. When he refuses, the don starts to order what may be a hit on him. Gino then agrees, planning to buy a fishing boat with the money he will earn after a three-year sentence. He signs a confession and allows his fingerprints to be put on the murder weapon.

While preparing for his court confession, Gino is watched over by Jerry, a bottom-rung gangster who has recently gotten into trouble for failing to follow orders. Facing a boring stay at a local hotel and faced with Gino's inability to suggest recreations he would like for his last few days of freedom, Jerry decides to give Gino a weekend to remember in Lake Tahoe before he goes to prison.

Arriving at the resort and casino, Jerry's tall tales and Gino's quiet dignity immediately get Gino mistaken for a powerful mafioso, resulting in his and Jerry's treatment as VIPs. However, they are then summoned to the Nevada home of Joseph 'Don Giuseppe' Vincent, where a frantic Jerry is certain that their lowly status will be found out. However, Don Giuseppe takes a liking to Gino and the two elderly Sicilians bond.

Narrowly escaping after Mr. Green turns up at Vincenzo's home as part of a Mafia meeting, a relieved Jerry manages to get Gino back to Chicago safely. Jerry, who has become sympathetic to Gino, now urges Gino to flee but he refuses to break his word. However, on the day Gino is to confess in court, Jerry discovers that his superiors were merely stalling for time; Gino is to be killed, and Jerry is to be the one who does the killing. Instead, Gino calls Don Giuseppe, taking him up on his promise to do anything to help Gino due to their friendship. Mr. Green's henchman Frankie is shown pleading guilty to the crime and receiving a 20-year sentence. In the end, Jerry begins working with Gino, shining shoes.

== Cast ==
- Don Ameche as Gino
- Joe Mantegna as Jerry
- Robert Prosky as Don Giuseppe
- Mike Nussbaum as Mr. Green
- J. J. Johnston as Frankie
- Ricky Jay as Mr. Silver
- William H. Macy as Billy Drake
- Jonathan Katz as Jackie Shore

== Film connections ==
Things Change was Mamet's directorial follow-up to House of Games and also takes place in the world of crime. The two films share many cast members, including Joe Mantegna, Ricky Jay, Mike Nussbaum, William H. Macy (credited as W.H. Macy), and J. T. Walsh, as well as many production staff members. In addition, other recurring collaborators from Mamet's resident ensemble at Atlantic Theatre Company appeared in the film, including Felicity Huffman and Clark Gregg.

== Release ==
Things Change was first shown at the 1988 Venice Film Festival on August 31, 1988 and had its U.S. premiere on October 7, 1988 at the Lincoln Center in New York City. It was released on October 21, 1988, in 99 U.S. theaters.

== Reception ==
The film carries an 85% rating on Rotten Tomatoes from 13 reviews, with an average score of 7/10.

Critic Roger Ebert praised the film, describing it as "a neat little exercise in wit and deception" and "a delicate balance of things that don't easily go together: farce, wit, violence and heart."

Co-stars Mantegna and Ameche received Volpi Cups at the Venice Film Festival for their performances in the film.

Things Change grossed US$3.5 million.

== See also ==
- List of American films of 1988
