= United States Women's Bureau =

US government agency

Women's Bureau
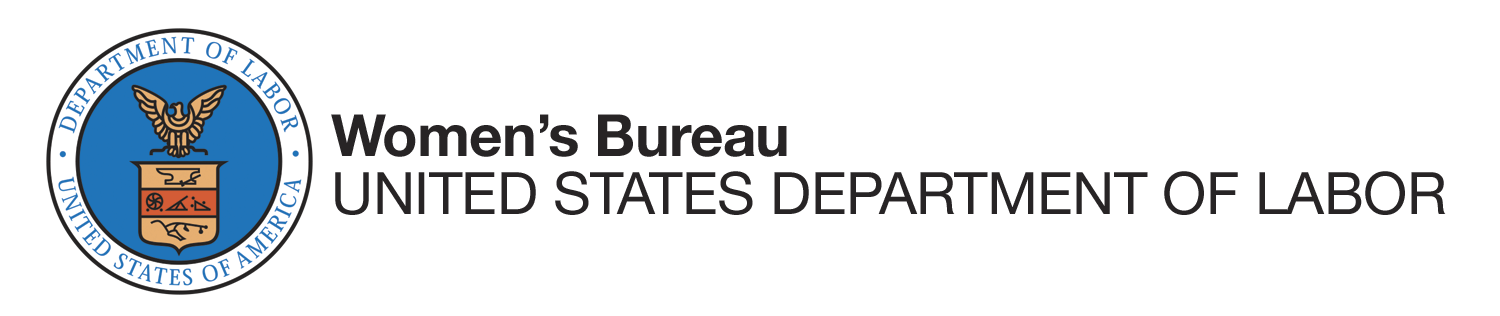

Agency overview
- Formed: June 5, 1920
- Preceding agency: Woman in Industry Service
- Jurisdiction: Federal government of the United States
- Headquarters: Frances Perkins Building Washington, D.C.
- Employees: 100
- Agency executives: Loretta Greene, Acting Director; Reeba Daniel, Acting Deputy Director; Michael Brice, Acting Administrative Officer; Charmaine Davis, Director of Regional Programs and Operations
- Parent department: Department of Labor
- Website: dol.gov/wb

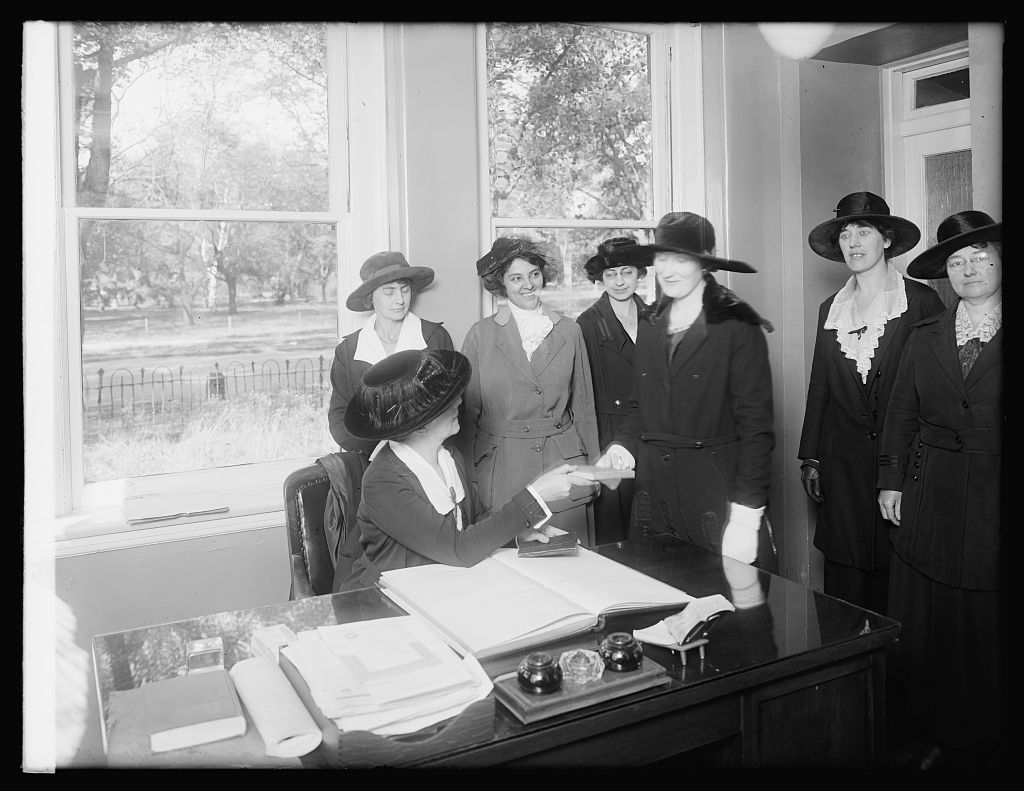
Women's Bureau in 1920

The United States Women's Bureau (WB) is an agency of the United States government within the United States Department of Labor. The Women's Bureau works to create parity for women in the labor force by conducting research and policy analysis, to inform and promote policy change, and to increase public awareness and education.

The Director is appointed by the President. Prior to the Presidential Appointment Efficiency and Streamlining Act of 2011, the position required confirmation by advice and consent of the Senate. Since its founding in 1920, the Director of the Women's Bureau has always been a woman. She is supported by a staff in the national office as well as ten regional offices.

== Establishment ==
The Women's Bureau evolved out of the Woman in Industry Service, which was established on July 1, 1918, as a war-time service to employ women. It was headed by social activist Mary van Kleeck, who was the head of the Department of Industrial Studies at the Russell Sage Foundation. In 1917, amidst World War I, van Kleeck undertook an investigation of the possibility of employment of women in Army warehouses at the behest of the War Industries Board. She recommended the creation of a Women's Bureau in the War Department, and as a result President Wilson appointed van Kleeck to lead a new Women in Industry Service group, a sub-agency of the Department of Labor. Van Kleeck wrote that the great numbers of women brought into the workforce by the war represented a "new freedom" for women: "freedom to serve their country through their industry not as women but as workers judged by the same standards and rewarded by the same recompense as men".

The Women in Industry Service group produced a series of reports documenting wage disparities, unsafe working conditions, and discrimination against female laborers, conducting investigations in 31 states. However, their recommendations were often ignored, and at an October 1918 conference to discuss women's labor organized by van Kleeck, Secretary of Labor William Wilson declined to take action to address wage inequality. In December 1918, the group published a wide-ranging report entitled Standards for the Employment of Women in Industry, which was later used as the basis for the groundbreaking Fair Labor Standards Act of 1938, which applied basic working standards to men and women throughout the country.

After the war, van Kleeck's group became the United States Women's Bureau. Van Kleeck helped write the law enabling this transition in June 1920. On July 14, van Kleeck was appointed as the head of the new agency within the Department of Labor. Although she was expected to lead the Bureau permanently, van Kleeck was called away to help care for her dying mother and resigned after a few weeks. Mary Anderson, her close friend and colleague, became its first long-term director instead.

The Bureau was established by Congress on June 5, 1920, just two months before women achieved the right to vote, and continues its responsibility to carry out Public Law 66-259; 29 U.S.C. 11–16.29 (1920) Their enabling legislation gives them the duty to formulate policies and standards to promote the welfare of wage-earning women, improve their working conditions, increase their efficiency, and advance their opportunities for profitable employment. The Women's Bureau's collaboration with the National Consumers League and the Women's Educational and Industrial Union allowed the Bureau to effectively research and advocate for women workers.

== History ==
In the 1920s and 30s, the Women's Bureau focused on women's working conditions in industries including manufacturing, household employment and clothing industry. 21% of American's employed at this time were women, who worked long hours with little wages. In 1922, the WB began investigating the conditions facing 'negro women in industry.' By focusing on minority groups, Mary Anderson, the Bureau's first director, was able to get social justice legislation passed for women since the administration largely ignored these groups. The WB successfully advocated for the inclusion of women under the Fair Labor Standards Act of 1938, which, for the first time, set minimum wages and maximum working hours.

As American men were mobilized for entering World War II, many women began working in nontraditional roles such as in aircraft plants, shipyards, and manufacturing companies. These jobs also paid more than traditional "women's work". The Bureau shifted its focus in this time to achieve more skills training, wider job opportunities, higher wages and better working conditions for the 'new' female workforce. The WB was an esteemed agency by 1942 and reports were consistently conservative, often repeating stereotypical ideas of women's strengths and weaknesses. However, the records of the Bureau during World War II contain a wealth of data and information about women with the focus remaining on the conditions of employed women, often neglecting middle-class women and continual support for special legislation for women's employment.

In the 1940s and 50s, the WB turned its attention how women's employment outlook and opportunities changed in the postwar period. After 1942, the Bureau officials hoped to have an audience in the federal government and to play a large role in labor mobilization. This hope never came to fruition and in April 1942, the War Manpower Commission headed labor mobilization. The commission, led by Paul McNutt, rejected the idea of having any woman on his labor advisory commission instead creating a Women's Advisory Committee. However, both the Bureau and the Advisory Committee's advice regarding women's employment was often disregarded.

in the 1950s and 60s, the WB developed policies and programs to increase women college graduates. The WB played an instrumental role in the passage of the Equal Pay Act of 1963, which amended the Fair Labor Standards Act. It effectively removed the ability to pay employees differently, based on sex. John F. Kennedy signed the law on June 10, 1963. However, during this time, the Bureau was opposed to the Equal Rights Amendment (ERA) introduced by the National Woman's Party in 1923 until Kennedy took office in 1961. This was due to the commitment the WB had in maintaining protective labor legislation for women. During Kennedy's campaign, he needed to recognize a political constituency. However instead of supporting an ERA during his presidency, he created a Presidential Commission on the Status of Women. The commission was headed by Eleanor Roosevelt, an ERA supporter, until her death 1962, after which the commission was unofficially headed by Women's Bureau director and ERA opponent, Esther Peterson, who had advocated for the formation of the Commission early on. With Peterson as the de facto head, the final report by the commission made no flat statement for or against passage of the ERA. It did, however, urge the courts to expand the 14th amendment to grant full Constitutional equality to women.

Elizabeth Duncan Koontz was the first Black woman to head the Bureau in 1969. The United Nations Commission on the Status of Women named Koontz a U.S. Delegate and with this added role, she worked with the Bureau to share research and expertise in developing countries. Under Koontz's leadership, the WB also worked to address and eliminate description against women and minorities in the workforce. They supported the proposed Equal Rights Amendment (ERA). Carmen Rosa Maymi headed the Women's Bureau in 1975 as the highest-ranking Hispanic woman in the Federal Government and the first Hispanic Director of the Bureau.

Following the 1973 Comprehensive Employment and Training Act (CETA) designed to train workers and provide them with public service jobs, the Bureau began developing programs for CETA funds that focused on special counseling and referral services, women in non-traditional jobs, pre-apprenticeship training and job development. Many of these new programs were also designed to help low-income women. The Bureau also had a role in the passage of the Pregnancy Discrimination Act of 1978.

From 1978 to 1980, the Bureau contracted with Coal Employment Project to carry out a two-phase, experimental program in the five county mining area of Anderson, Campbell, Claiborne, Morgan, and Scott in Tennessee. CEP was a non-profit women's organization founded in 1977 with the goal of women gaining employment as miners. With local support groups in both the eastern and western coalfields, CEP also advocated for women on issues such as sexual harassment, mine safety, equal access to training and promotions, parental leave, and wages.

The program with CEP centered on the development of a training program that considered the needs of women—which was accomplished with the aid of federal and state mining officials, coal industry leaders, union officials, U.S. Department of Labor Mine Safety and Health officials, state training instructors, and actual women miners. Its focus was on federally required safety instruction, information on federal and state antidiscrimination laws, union rights, physical development, techniques on assertiveness, and credit and social security rights. Also involved were all-women panels that discussed how they handled problems that often concerned women, like sexual harassment.

In the 1960s, the Bureau started an on-site day care center. This led to the Bureau launching a major initiative to encourage employer-sponsored child care in 1982. The result of this initiative was the establishment of a multi-media Work and Family Clearinghouse in 1989 and the Family and Medical Leave Act of 1993, that mandated employers to provide employees job-protected and unpaid leave for qualified medical and family reasons.

The Bureau focused on non-traditional employment for women in the 1990s, including apprenticeships and domestic workers. In 1996, the WB published a fact sheet on the workplace effects of domestic violence.

In 2014, the WB teamed up with the White House and the Center for American Progress for the White House Summit on Working Families convening businesses, economists, labor leaders, legislators, advocates, and the media for a discussion on issues facing the entire spectrum of working families, including workplace flexibility, equal pay, workplace discrimination, worker retention and promotion, and childcare/early childhood education.

== List of directors ==
- Mary van Kleeck, 1920 (temporary)
- Mary Anderson, 1920–1944
- Frieda S. Miller, 1944–1953
- Alice Leopold, 1953–1961
- Esther Peterson, 1961–1964
- Mary Dublin Keyserling, 1964–1969
- Elizabeth Duncan Koontz, 1969–1973
- Carmen Rosa Maymi, 1973–1977
- Alexis M. Herman, 1977–1981
- Lenora Cole Alexander, 1981–1986
- Shirley M. Dennis, 1986–1988
- Jill Houghton Emery (Phillips), 1988–1989
- Elsie Vartanian, 1991–1993
- Karen Nussbaum, 1993–1996
- Irasema T. Garza, 1999–2000
- Shinae Chun, 2001–2009
- Sara Manzano-Diaz, 2010–2012
- Latifa Lyles, 2012–2017
- Patricia G. Greene, 2017–2018
- Laurie Todd-Smith, 2019–2021
- Wendy Chun-Hoon, 2021–2024
- Tiffany Boiman, 2024–2025
- Loretta Greene, 2025–present

== Select publications ==
- Pidgeon, Mary Elizabeth. Bureau Special Bulletin 20: Occupational Status of Women in 1944. Washington: U.S. Government Printing Office, 1944.
