= Pauline Newman (labor activist) =

American labor activist (1887–1986)

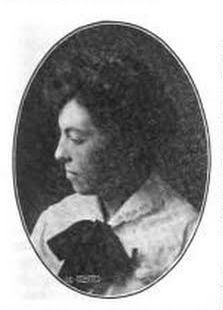
- Pauline M. Newman in The Progressive Woman, February 1912
- Born: October 18, 1887; Kaunas, Kovno Governorate, Russian Empire (present-day Lithuania)
- Died: April 8, 1986 (aged 98); New York City, New York, U.S.
- Occupation: Labor union functionary
- Known for: General Organizer for the International Ladies Garment Workers Union

Pauline M. Newman (October 18, 1887 – April 8, 1986) was an American labor activist. She is best remembered as the first female general organizer of the International Ladies Garment Workers Union (ILGWU) and for six decades of work as the education director of the ILGWU Health Center.

== Biography ==
=== Early years ===
Pauline M. Newman was born in the late 1880s, near Kaunas, a city in the then Russian Empire's Pale of Settlement. Today that city is in present-day Lithuania. She was the youngest of four children. Her father was a teacher and her mother sold produce in the local market.

Newman fought for her early education. The local public school refused Jews, and Jewish schools refused women. She convinced her father to let her sit in on his classes. She learned to read and write in Hebrew and Yiddish. She also challenged the custom of the mechitza, dividing the congregation along gender lines. Following the death of her father, Newman, her mother and sisters emigrated to New York City where her older brother had settled. At age nine, Newman went to work in a brush factory. At 11 she took a job at the Triangle Shirtwaist Factory. Disturbed by the miserable conditions, Newman was drawn to the Socialist Party through the popular Yiddish newspaper The Jewish Daily Forward. At age fifteen, she joined a Socialist Literary Society, and organized after-work study groups at the Triangle factory. These became the basis for the women's unions she would soon organize.

=== Initial labor activism ===
In 1907, with New York City in the grip of a depression and thousands facing eviction, the twenty-year-old Newman took a group of "self-supporting women" to camp for the summer on the Palisades above the Hudson River. There, they planned an assault on the "high cost of living". In late 1907 - early 1908, on Newman and her band led a winter rent strike involving 10,000 families in lower Manhattan. These families refused to pay their rent and this strike became the largest rent strike New York City had ever seen, and it triggered decades of tenant activism, which eventually led to the establishment of rent controls. As the leader of the strike, Newman received a great deal of attention and was dubbed by New York Times as the East Side Joan of Arc.

Soon after, at the age of twenty-one, Newman won the New York State Socialist Party nomination for secretary of state. Women did not yet have the vote in New York, but Newman used her 1908 campaign as an opportunity to stump for woman suffrage. She believed that women workers needed the political power of the ballot to back up the economic power they had won by joining unions. Using the two together, they would help the working class achieve economic freedom.

Newman's campaigns for the vote were always conducted in the context of organizing women workers. For two years after the great rent strike, Newman and other garment workers went shop to shop in Lower Manhattan organizing young women who were growing increasingly discontented with the working conditions such as speedups in the production rate, being charged for thread and electricity, and with having their pay docked whenever they made mistakes.

On November 22, 1909, Newman began organizing and preparing for a general strike. In weeks and months that followed, more than 40,000 young women workers in New York left their sewing machines and refused to work. This would be the largest strike created and organized by American women up to that time, and Pauline Newman was a whirlwind at its core. Newman met with some of the city's most powerful and wealthy women, explaining the horrific conditions under which shirtwaist dresses were manufactured. She won the sympathy of many of New York's wealthiest and their mere presence dramatically cut down police brutality against the strikers.

=== ILGWU organizer ===
In recognition of her central role in organizing and sustaining the strike, Newman was appointed as the first woman general organizer for the International Ladies Garment Workers Union (ILGWU). From 1909 to 1913, she organized garment strikes around the country, organizing in Philadelphia, Cleveland, Boston, and Kalamazoo, Michigan. In addition, she stumped for the Socialist Party of America in the freezing, bleak coal-mining camps of southern Illinois and continued to campaign for woman suffrage for the Women's Trade Union League. Although, waves of successful strikes were happening all around the United States, it was a lonely and frustrating few years for Newman. She felt that the union leadership had little interest in organizing women and that her work was undervalued and undermined at every turn.

Her anger, fears, and doubts sank her into a deep depression following the Triangle Shirtwaist Factory fire of March 25, 1911. A total of 146 young workers lost their lives during the tragedy, most of them immigrant Jews and Italians. Newman, who had worked at the factory for seven years, was friends of many of the victims. Soon after, New York State established the Factory Investigation Commission (FIC). An investigative body with real powers of enforcement, the FIC brought government into the shops to guarantee worker safety. Newman was offered a post as one of the FIC's first inspectors and she gladly accepted.

Through this job, she met Frances Perkins, who would later become Franklin Roosevelt's secretary of labor and the first woman to serve in the cabinet post. Newman and Perkins worked together to improve working conditions. Perkins and Newman took state legislators on tours of the worst factories in the state and through this, Newman gained the respect of these political figures, who would call on her for advice or consultation many times over the next half century.

Her years on the FIC marked the beginning of a new career path for Newman that would end her days as a street-level organizer. As a result of her ability to speak with equal effectiveness to workers, governmental officials, labor leaders, and educated women reformers, Newman had become a liaison between the labor movement and government. Newman's life was forever changed by her entry into the world of lobbying and legislative politics. In 1917, the Women's Trade Union League dispatched Newman to Philadelphia, to build a new branch of the league. There she met a young Bryn Mawr economics instructor named Frieda S. Miller.

Miller, who was chafing at the constraints of academic life, gladly left academia to help Newman with her organizing. Within the year, the two were living together. It was the beginning of a turbulent but mutually satisfying relationship that would last until Miller's death in 1974. In 1923, the two women moved to New York's Greenwich Village, where they raised Miller's daughter together. Though lesbian families were not openly discussed in the 1920s, their family seems to have been accepted by government and union friends and colleagues.

=== ILGWU Health Center Education Director ===
In 1923, Newman became the educational director for the ILGWU Health Center. This center was the first comprehensive medical program created by a union for its members. Newman would carry out that position for sixty years, using it to promote worker health care, adult education, and greater visibility for women in the union. She quickly became a beloved and highly respected mentor to young women in the union. In addition, she promoted the cause of women in trade unions through her positions as vice president of the New York and National Women's Trade Union Leagues.

From the late 1920s on, Newman worked for and helped to shape government agencies charged with the task of improving working conditions for women workers. She negotiated state minimum wage and factory safety codes during the 1930s and 1940s that exceeded federal standards. She also served on the U.S. Women's Bureau Labor Advisor Board, the United Nations Subcommittee on the Status of Women, and the International Labor Organization Subcommittee on the Status of Domestic Laborers.

Newman's access to the federal government had come first through her connection to Eleanor Roosevelt. Newman and Miller were part of the circle of women who surrounded Eleanor Roosevelt in the 1920s and 1930s. They were both regular guests at Val-Kill, the cottage that Franklin Roosevelt built for Eleanor Roosevelt near the family mansion at Hyde Park. During the mid-1930s, Newman visited the White House regularly. In 1936, she received national news coverage when Franklin and Eleanor Roosevelt invited her and a group of young women garment and textile workers to stay as guests for a week at the White House.

Newman also made a point of reaching out to ethnic constituencies who had been ignored or shut out of trade unions. She worked to bring African American women as well as Mexican American women into previously all-white labor unions.

=== Post-World War II years ===
After World War II, Newman and Miller were commissioned by the U.S. Departments of State and Labor to investigate postwar factory conditions in Germany. During the Truman years, Newman addressed the White House Conference on child labor and served as a regular consultant to the U.S. Public Health Service on matters of child labor and industrial hygiene.

Newman continued to work for the ILGWU until 1983. Mentorship was Newman's major contributions to the women's labor struggle in the later years of her career. Writing, lecturing, and advising younger women organizers, Newman educated and prepared them for the future. Moreover, during her seventy-plus years with the union, she waged a constant struggle to convince male leaders to acknowledge the needs and talents of women workers.

With the revival of the feminist movement in the 1970s, the elderly Newman came to be seen as a feminist hero. In 1974, the Coalition of Labor Union Women honored her as a foremother of the women's liberation movement. In addition, she spoke regularly to historians and reporters and to groups of young women workers, her heavily wrinkled face telling as much as her words about her decades of struggle on behalf of the labor movement. Newman's regular writings also serve as a valuable resource for scholars of women and trade unionism.

=== Death and legacy ===
Pauline Newman died on April 8, 1986, at the New York City home of her adopted daughter, Elisabeth Burger. She was 98 years old at the time of her death. Newman's death aroused grief and sadness among the ILGWU and women trade unionists. She had created a space for herself as a negotiator- standing with one foot in the male-dominated labor movement and one foot in the cross-class world of women reformers. She influenced many people during her time. Her contributions as an organizer, a legislative expert, a writer, and a mentor to younger women activists were significant and wide-ranging.

Newman left an unpublished autobiography, the manuscript of which resides at the Kheel Center for Labor-Management Documentation and Archives at Cornell University in Ithaca, New York.
