= Elisabeth Burger =

American economist

- Born: Elisabeth Miller; December 7, 1923; Naples, Italy
- Died: December 22, 2013 (aged 90)
- Education: Little Red School House; Vassar College
- Occupation: Economist
- Organization(s): International Labour Organization; Council on Foreign Relations; Planned Parenthood
- Spouse(s): Arthur David Kemp Owen (1950 - 1970); Chester Burger (1971 - 2011)
- Children: Michael Owen; Hugh Owen
- Parent(s): Frieda S. Miller; Pauline Newman

Elisabeth Owen Burger (1923–2013) was an American economist who served as a consultant for various state, national, and international organizations. She was involved in a numerous women's political events and organizations. She was the daughter of labor activists Pauline Newman and Frieda S. Miller, and wife of Sir Arthur David Kemp Owen and, later, Chester Burger.

== Childhood and family life ==
Burger was born in 1923 to Frieda S. Miller, a noted labor rights activist. Born Elisabeth Miller, Burger was raised by Miller and her partner, Pauline Newman. Newman and Miller's relationship had been romantic in nature for several years, however in 1923 Miller participated in an affair with labor mediator Charles Kutz that resulted in her pregnancy with Elisabeth. Upon the revelation that Miller was pregnant, Miller and Newman left several months early for the 1923 International Congress of Working Women in Vienna and told the public that they had done so to adopt a European orphan. Instead, Miller hid her pregnancy through this trip to Europe. Burger herself was not told that Miller was her biological mother until she was seventeen years old.

When Miller and Newman returned to the United States with Elisabeth, they raised her together in Greenwich Village, New York. Greenwich Village was home to many other progressive women committed to labor politics, and the family was close friends with neighboring couples such as Nancy Cook and Marion Dickerman, and Mary (Molly) Dewson and Mary "Polly" Porter. Burger attended the Little Red School House, a progressive school, and said in an interview: "'From time to time I had the sense that my situation was different, but only from time to time.'" In that interview, she did not recall encountering prejudice from her classmates or neighbors regarding her family life. The family was not questioned by Miller nor Newman's labor colleagues, either; both Miller and Newman kept photographs of Elisabeth on their desks at work, and Elisabeth was invited as part of the family to official functions. Elisabeth said in an interview about Pauline Newman that "'just as Pauline was a pioneer in her role as an organizer of women in sweatshops and factories...the home that I grew up in was in some respects a harbinger of things to come — a female-headed household made up of two employed women and a child.'" After Elisabeth's birth, Newman chose work close to New York so as to allow her to spend more time at home, while Miller worked wherever she was needed. Newman and Elisabeth developed a close relationship that lasted throughout Newman's life. When Elisabeth had children, Newman would often come to her home on Sundays to help Elisabeth with childcare. Frieda Miller spent the last years of her life in an old age home, the Walsh Home, which Burger regretted intensely, so when Newman slipped and injured herself in 1983, Burger invited her to stay in the Burger family home. Newman lived with Elisabeth Burger for two and a half years before she died in 1986, at age 96.

== Adulthood and career ==
Burger attended Vassar College and spent the early years of her career training as an economist. Beginning in 1944, she worked for the International Labour Organization in Geneva, Switzerland. She was a research assistant, and did research and editorial work on the topic of women and young workers, vocational education, and manpower. It was at the ILO that she met her first husband, Arthur David Kemp Owen. Owen was the Assistant-Secretary General for Economic Affairs at the United Nations, and co-founded the United Nations Development Programme. They were married in 1950. Arthur and Elisabeth had two sons, Michael and Hugh. She continued her career as a staff member on the Council on Foreign Relations and as a member of the New York State Committee on the Education and Employment of Women. From 1951 to 1956, Elisabeth was a member of the East Manhattan Branch of the League of Women Voters, working on their economic program, and she was active in the Parents' Associations of her sons' schools. She also served on the Independent Schools Committee of the Public Education Association, and took some classes towards a master's degree in education at Columbia University in the late 1950s. In 1969, Owen became the General Secretary of the International Planned Parenthood Federation, and was knighted that same year. Elisabeth briefly became Lady Owen, and Sir Arthur David Kemp Owen died in 1970.

Elisabeth was remarried in 1971 to Chester Burger, the owner of a management consulting firm specializing in public relations. Chester Burger was also the vice president and trustee of the National Urban League Development Foundation. Elisabeth worked as a consultant to various organizations on the state, national, and international level, including the Council on Foreign Relations. She served on the board of directors for Planned Parenthood in New York, and participated in the United Nations Secretariat for the International Women's Year in 1975. She was also an active member of the Cosmopolitan Club. Chester Burger died in March, 2011.

== Death and legacy ==
Burger died on December 22, 2013. At the time of her death, she had ten grandchildren and eleven great-grandchildren, as well as many step children, step-grandchildren, and step-great-grandchildren. Her papers were donated to Schlesinger Library at the Radcliffe Institute for Advanced Study by her son Michael Owen in November, 2014.
