= Frieda S. Miller =

American labor activist

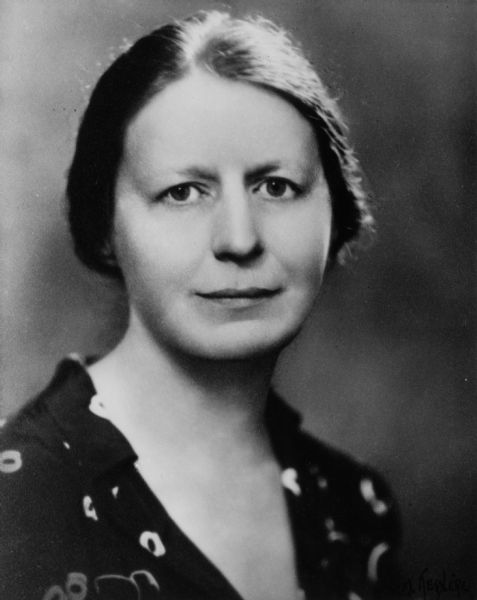
- Born: Frieda Segelke Miller; April 16, 1890; La Crosse, Wisconsin
- Died: July 21, 1973 (aged 83); Manhattan, New York
- Occupations: government administrator, labor and women's rights activist
- Years active: 1916–1967

Frieda S. Miller (April 16, 1890 – July 21, 1973) was an American labor activist, government administrator and women's rights activist. She served as the Industrial Commissioner of New York from 1938 to 1942 and the director of the United States Women's Bureau from 1944 to 1953. From 1936 through the 1950s, she worked with the International Labour Organization advising on women's employment issues. In the 1960s, she served in various capacities as a delegate to the United Nations focused on issues for women and children.

== Early life ==
Frieda Segelke Miller was born on April 16, 1890, in La Crosse, Wisconsin, to Erna (née Segelke) and James Gordon Miller. Her father was a lawyer, who died when she was thirteen. Her mother had died when Miller was five years old. She was raised in La Crosse, along with her sister Elsie, by her maternal grandparents Charles and Augusta Segelke. After completing her secondary education, she attended Downer College, graduating in 1911 with a bachelor's degree. She pursued graduate studies at the University of Chicago, over the next four years, researching in economics, law, political science, and sociology, but did not obtain a degree.

== Career ==
In 1916, Miller began her career working as a research assistant and teaching social economics at Bryn Mawr College in Pennsylvania. Hired as a secretary in 1917, she worked at the Philadelphia Women's Trade Union League, organizing a college and teaching economics courses through 1923. Around the same time, she met Pauline Newman, a labor organizer who had recently come to Philadelphia working with the Women's Trade Union League. The two women would become life-long partners and moved in together within a year. When women won the right to vote, Miller became a candidate for the United States House of Representatives running on the Farmer-Labor Party ticket. Though she did not win, she received over 25,000 votes in the 1920 election. Miller had an affair with a married man, Charles Kutz, in 1922 and became pregnant. Deciding to raise the child (the future Elisabeth Burger (1923–2013), at one time Lady Owen), together she and Newman invented a story that they had adopted a child abroad, to protect Miller's reputation. As a cover for their fiction, the two attended the International Congress of Working Women in Vienna in 1923 and the baby was born abroad. They did not return to Philadelphia, but instead moved to Greenwich Village in New York City, where Newman took up a post as the educational director at the International Ladies' Garment Workers' Union (ILGWU). Miller soon found work, as an inspector for the Joint Board of Sanitary Control.

Within the circle of friends the two made through their affiliation with the Women's Trade Union League were Elisabeth Cristman, Mary Dreier, Frances Perkins, Eleanor Roosevelt, Rose Schneiderman, Maude Swartz. In 1928, Perkins, Industrial Commissioner for the State of New York, hired Miller as the director of the Bureau of Women in Industry and she spent the next several years working on legislation to create a minimum wage law for women and children, which passed in 1933. When Franklin D. Roosevelt won the presidency, he took Perkins with him to Washington, and she used her influence to have Miller appointed as a delegate to the International Labour Organization (ILO), an agency of the League of Nations in 1936. President Roosevelt appointed her to represent the United States in the Inter-American Regional Conferences of the ILO and she served as an advisor for women workers to the executive board. In 1938, Miller was appointed by Governor Herbert H. Lehman to fill the post as state Industrial Commissioner, replacing Elmer F. Andrews. During her tenure as commissioner, Miller developed a system to implement the state unemployment insurance program and reorganize the state's employment service to improve job placement and deal with the unemployment problems generated by the Great Depression. Within a year, her reforms led to a fifty percent increase in employment placements in the state.

When Lehman's governorship ended in 1942, Miller resigned as commissioner and went to work as the special assistant for labor the United States Ambassador to the United Kingdom, John G. Winant. In 1944, when Mary Anderson retired from the United States Women's Bureau, she selected Miller to be her successor. Her major focus as director was to develop programs to improve equal pay and access to jobs for women. When the war ended, women, who had been employed in war industries lost their jobs creating both large-scale unemployment and a push to return women to low-wage jobs, primarily in clerical and service-related positions. Creating a Labor Advisory Committee in 1945, Miller was the first director of the Women's Bureau to invite union women to attend monthly conferences to discuss labor issues. Miller stressed the importance of women using their networks to bring awareness to the low pay and poor conditions under which women labored. She recognized that collective bargaining alone would be insufficient to generate change, as so many women's jobs were not unionized, and urged union leadership to reach out to legislators to improve wages for all occupations in which women worked. She also proposed innovative solutions, such as establishing pay rates according to job, which would eliminate discrimination based on outside factors, such as gender. The recommendations were partially successful, as during her tenure six states approved equal pay laws, though they did not meet all the protections the Women's Bureau wanted. By the end of the 1950s twenty states had adopted limited policies for equal pay, but the efforts were inadequate and advocates continued to push for national legislation.

When Dwight D. Eisenhower was elected president in 1953, he asked for Miller to resign. She returned to her work for the ILO, and increasingly relied on Newman to care for Elisabeth while she traveled abroad. Evaluating the economic status of women workers, Miller compiled reports in the Far East and South America throughout 1955 and 1956. In 1957, she became a delegate to the United Nations for the International Alliance of Women, serving through 1958. In that year, Miller, who was nearing seventy began a relationship with a man, that Newman felt threatened by and which caused her to wonder if their relationship had ended. The concern was serious enough for Newman to sell her interest in the summer home the two women owned in Coffeetown, Pennsylvania. Miller remained in Geneva, and beginning in the early 1960s, she worked on a survey for the International Union for Child Welfare becoming the organization's delegate to the United Nations. She worked on various UNICEF programs until 1967, when she retired and returned to New York. Miller had a stroke in 1969 and though they placed her in the Mary Manning Walsh Home at that time, Newman and Miller's daughter Elisabeth shared the care for Miller for the last four years of her life.

== Death and legacy ==
Miller died from pneumonia on July 21, 1973, in Manhattan, New York. Her papers were donated to the Schlesinger Library at Harvard's Radcliffe Institute for Advanced Study.
