= Elsie Vartanian =

12th Director of the United States Women's Bureau
- In office 1990–1993
- Preceded by: Jill Houghton Emery
- Succeeded by: Karen Nussbaum

Member of the New Hampshire House of Representatives
- In office 1979–1990

Personal details
- Born: July 9, 1930 Haverhill, Massachusetts
- Died: September 12, 2019 (aged 89) Tampa, Florida
- Party: Republican
- Children: 2

Elsie Vartanian (July 19, 1930 – September 12, 2019) was an American politician from New Hampshire. She served in the New Hampshire House of Representatives from 1979 to 1990, and later served as the director of the United States Women's Bureau.

== Biography ==
Vartanian was born on July 19, 1930 in Haverhill, Massachusetts. She married her husband, David, on November 9, 1952. After marriage, the two moved to their farm in New Hampshire.

Vartanian worked as a realtor. In 1977, she founded her own real estate company, Elsie Vartanian Real Estate, Inc., and served as the company's president until 1990.

Vartanian served as a representative in the New Hampshire House of Representatives from 1979 to 1990. On January 24, 1985, Vartanian was elected chairwoman of the New Hampshire Republican State Committee. In 1990, Vartanian resigned from the New Hampshire House after President George H. W. Bush selected her become director of the United States Women's Bureau, a position which she held until 1993.

In 1992, Vartanian and her husband moved to Tampa, Florida, where she continued working in real estate until 2012. She died there on September 12, 2019, at the age of 89.
