= Monroe Street School =

Historic school building in North Carolina, United States

- U.S. National Register of Historic Places
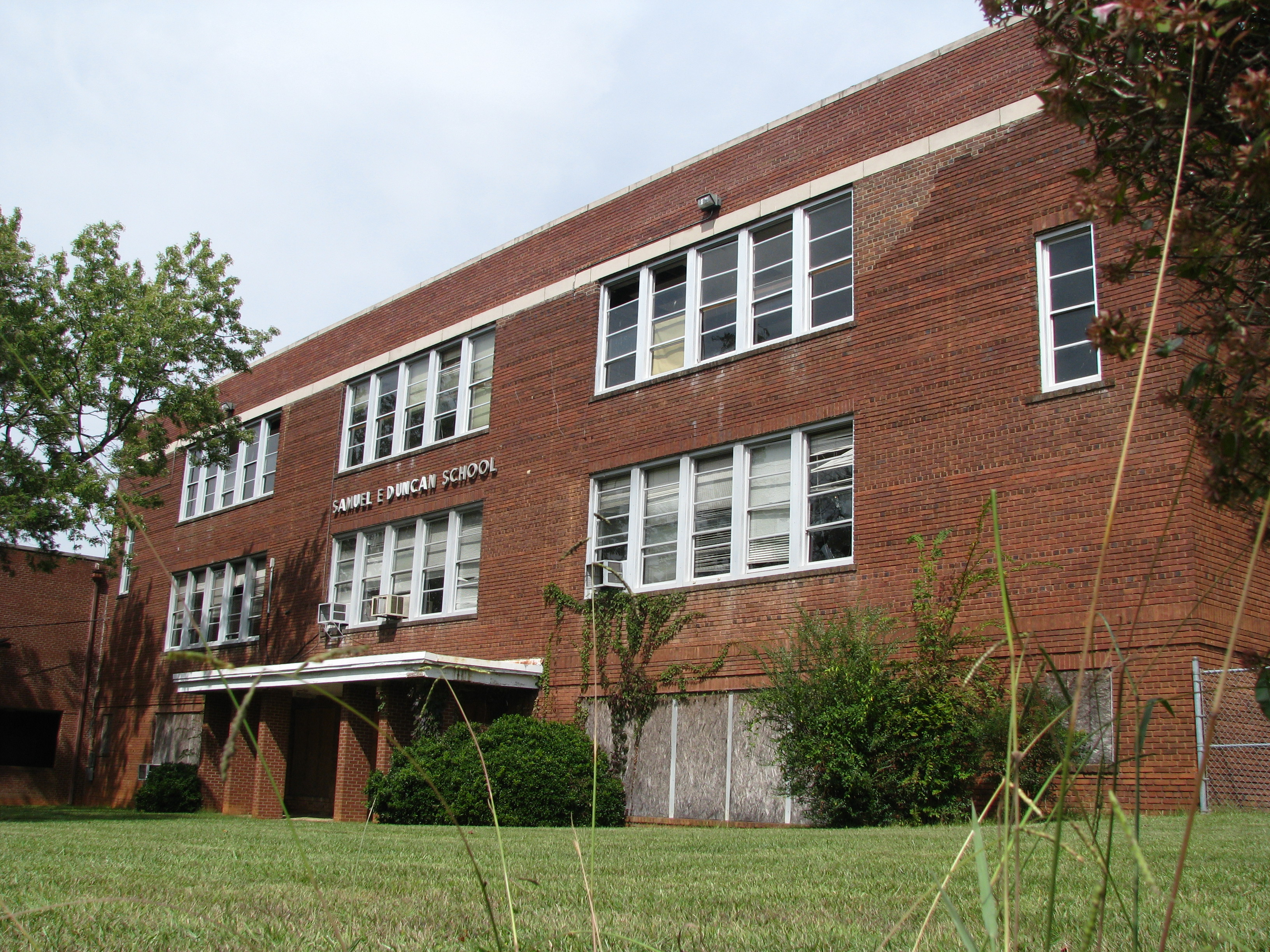
- Monroe Street School, September 2012

- Location within North Carolina Location within the United States
- Location: 1100 West Monroe St., Salisbury, North Carolina
- Coordinates: 35°40′24″N 80°29′6″W
- Area: 1.3 acres (0.53 ha)
- Built: 1923, 1941, 1960
- Architectural style: Classical Revival
- NRHP reference No.: 04000463
- Added to NRHP: May 19, 2004

Monroe Street School, also known as J.C. Price High School and S.E. Duncan Education Center of Livingstone College, is a historic school building located at Salisbury, Rowan County, North Carolina. It was built in 1923, and is a three-story, Classical Revival-style red brick building. It was damaged by fire in 1941 and rebuilt. A cafeteria addition was completed in 1960. The school originally served as Salisbury's only African-American public school. It was originally named J. C. Price High School, but the name was changed in 1931 with the construction of another school given that name.

It was listed on the National Register of Historic Places in 2003.
