= Susan Nussbaum =

American actress and activist (1953–2022)

- Susan Nussbaum, from a 1984 newspaper photo
- Born: Susan Ruth Nussbaum; December 12, 1953; Chicago, Illinois, U.S.
- Died: April 28, 2022 (aged 68); Chicago, Illinois, U.S.
- Occupations: Playwright, novelist, activist
- Father: Mike Nussbaum
- Relatives: Karen Nussbaum (sister)

Susan Ruth Nussbaum (December 12, 1953 – April 28, 2022) was an American actress, author, playwright, and disability rights activist.

== Early life and education ==
Nussbaum was born in Chicago and raised in nearby Highland Park, the daughter of Mike Nussbaum and Annette Brenner Nussbaum. Her father, a former exterminator, became a well-known actor and director; her mother was a publicist. Her sister Karen Nussbaum is a noted labor leader.

Nussbaum studied acting at Roosevelt University and Goodman School of Drama, both in Chicago. Nussbaum used a wheelchair after she survived being hit by a car in her twenties. "When I became a wheelchair user in the late '70s," she wrote in a 2012 essay, "all I knew about being disabled I learned from reading books and watching movies, and that scared the shit out of me."

== Career ==
As a performer, Nussbaum appeared a comic revue, Staring Back (1984), as Emma Goldman in Frank Galati's She Always Said, Pablo (1987), in another comic review, The Plucky and Spunky Show (1990), in her own one-woman show, Mishuganismo, directed by her father, in Activities of Daily Living (1994), and in No One As Nasty (2000). She worked with Marca Bristo on Access Living, and started a group of disabled girls and young women, The Empowered FeFes. She directed a production of Michael Vitali's G-Man! (1995), and two productions of Mike Ervin's The History of Bowling (1999).

Riva Lehrer painted a portrait of Nussbaum in 1998. In 2008, Nussbaum was named one of Utne Reader's "50 Visionaries Who Are Changing Your World." Her debut novel Good Kings, Bad Kings (2013) won the 2012 PEN/Bellwether Prize for Socially Engaged Fiction. The novel is set in an institution for disabled young people in the Chicago area.

== Works ==
- Staring Back (1983, sketch comedy show, co-written with Lawrence Perkins)
- The Plucky and Spunky Show (1990)
- Mishuganismo (1992, play)
- Telethon (1993, play, co-written with William Hammack)
- Activities of Daily Living (1994, play, co-writer)
- No One as Nasty (2000, play)
- Crippled Sisters (play)
- "Why are Fictional Characters with Disabilities So Unreal?" (2012, essay)
- Good Kings, Bad Kings (2013, novel)
- Code of the Freaks (2020, documentary, co-written and co-produced by Nussbaum)

== Personal life ==
Nussbaum had a daughter, Taina Rodriguez. She died from pneumonia in 2022, at the age of 68, at her home in Chicago. She was buried at Westlawn Cemetery in Norridge Illinois.
