= Harry Sawyer (mobster) =

Jewish-American organized crime boss (1890–1955)

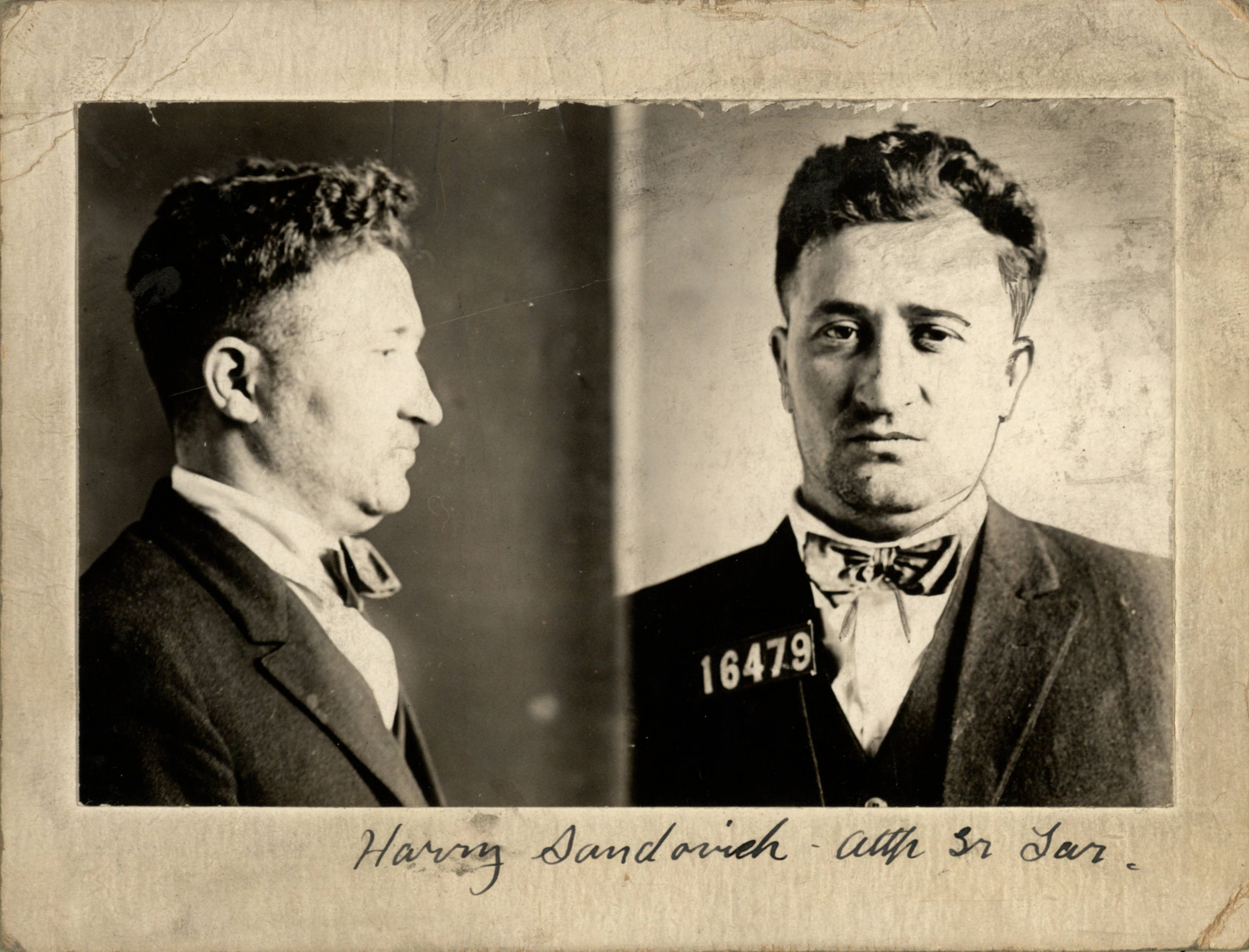
- Sandlovich's 1918 mugshot
- Born: Harry Sandlovich; March, 1890; Vilna Governorate-General, Russian Empire
- Died: June 23, 1955; Chicago, Illinois, U.S.
- Resting place: Westlawn Cemetery, Chicago, Illinois, U.S.
- Occupations: Gangster, racketeer, bootlegger
- Known for: Crime boss of the St. Paul mob
- Predecessor: Danny Hogan
- Allegiance: Barker–Karpis Gang; Chicago Outfit

Harry Sandlovich (c. 1890 – June 23, 1955), better known as Harry Sawyer, was a Jewish-American organized crime boss based in Saint Paul, Minnesota, during Prohibition and the Great Depression.

== Life ==
He was born into an Orthodox Jewish family in Vilna Governorate-General, Lithuania, Russian Empire.

He is infamous for the 1928 car bombing murder of St. Paul Irish mob boss Danny Hogan, and for collusion with mobbed up St. Paul police chief Thomas Archibald Brown and the Barker-Karpis Gang in both the Hamm and Bremer kidnappings, and with the Chicago Outfit in the murder of Fred Goetz.

On May 4, 1935, FBI agents from New Orleans, following up on a tip from local police, arrested Sawyer inside "a shabby gambling house", that he was secretly running in, "The Colored Section", of Pass Christian, Mississippi. He was returned to St. Paul for trial on May 6, and immediately identified in the testimony of cooperating witness Byron Bolton as the "finger man", in the Bremer kidnapping.

During his incarceration in Federal prison, the only one of Sawyer's relatives to remain in contact with him was his brother, Sam Sandlovich.

== Death ==
After being diagnosed with spinal cancer, Sawyer was finally paroled for medical reasons in February 1955. He died in a hospital in Chicago, Illinois in June 1955 and was buried in Westlawn Cemetery. According to Paul Maccabee, "Even in death, Sawyer remained an outcast from his family."

In an interview with Paul Maccabee, Harry Sawyer's niece, Carole DeMoss, the daughter of his brother Sam Sandlovich, recalled, "My mother said that the Sandlovich family disowned Harry. First for running a saloon in St. Paul, and then when he became involved with the Barker-Karpis Gang, they severed all ties with him. I didn't even know I had an uncle Harry until he died."
