= Danny Hogan =

American mobster

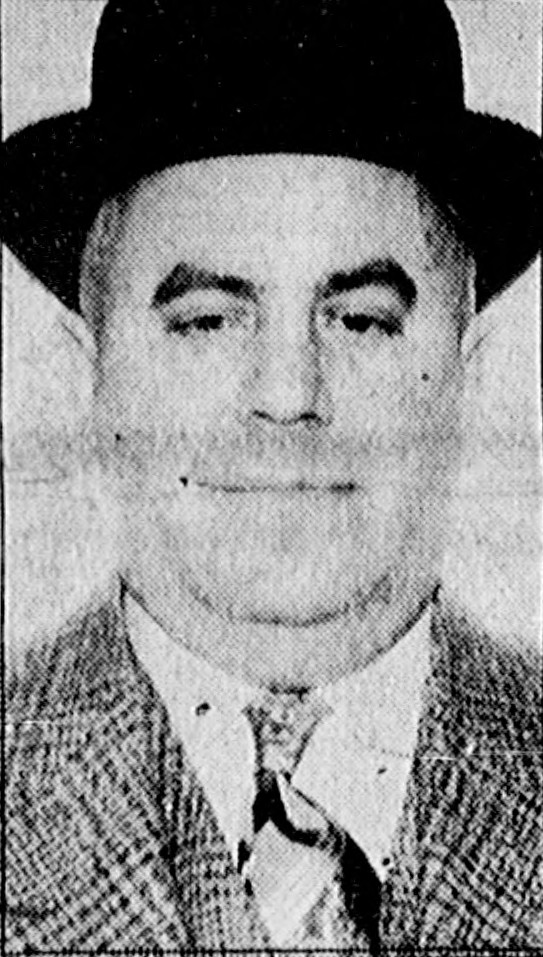
- Hogan c. 1928
- Born: Daniel P. Hogan c. 1880; California, U.S.
- Died: December 4, 1928; St. Paul, Minnesota, U.S.
- Cause of death: Car bomb
- Resting place: Calvary Cemetery, St. Paul, Minnesota, U.S.
- Other names: Dapper Dan; Danny
- Occupations: Gangster, fixer, racketeer, bootlegger
- Known for: Crime boss of the St. Paul Irish Mob
- Successor: Harry Sawyer
- Spouse: Leila Hogan
- Allegiance: Irish Mob

Daniel P. "Dapper Dan" Hogan (c. 1880 - December 4, 1928), also known as Danny Hogan, was an Irish-American organized crime figure, political fixer, and the boss of Saint Paul, Minnesota's Irish Mob both before and during Prohibition.

Following Hogan's 1928 murder by car bomb, his former position as leader of organized crime in St. Paul was taken over by Lithuanian Jewish gangster and former Hogan associate Harry Sawyer and his ally, corrupt police chief Big Tom Brown. They did not share Hogan's distaste for unnecessary violence. Their collusion with both the Dillinger and Barker-Karpis Gangs resulted in some of the most infamous crimes of the Depression era and in the rise of the Federal Bureau of Investigation under J. Edgar Hoover.

== Early life ==
According to his death certificate, Daniel Hogan was born c. 1880 to Irish Catholic parents in California.

Hogan was first arrested in Los Angeles for "room prowling" in 1905 and accordingly served a sentence at San Quentin. He went on to also serve prison terms in South Dakota, Minnesota, and Wisconsin for bank robbery and stealing furs.

== Criminal career in Saint Paul ==
Around 1909, Hogan permanently settled in Saint Paul, where, "he discovered his true calling - organizing major crimes from the sanctuary of St. Paul, selecting the criminal personnel for the job, and laundering stolen merchandise, particularly hard-to-fence Government bonds."

During the same era, Hogan's close ally, mobbed up St. Paul Police Chief John O'Connor, allowed criminals and fugitives to operate in the city as long as they checked in with Hogan, paid a small bribe, and promised not to kill, kidnap, rape, or rob within the city limits.

Even though Hogan himself often skirted this rule, according to Paul Maccabee, "Hogan's robberies, unlike those of Bonnie Parker, Clyde Barrow, and other better-known bandits, nearly always reaped substantial profits and seldom resulted in gunplay."

Hogan became a fixer so closely connected to the Democratic Party political machine that ran St. Paul that police officers not only feared him, but actively protected his organization. The U.S. Department of Justice made repeated attempts to prosecute him, but always failed.

Hogan also acted as an "ambassador" for Chief O'Connor and visiting mobsters from the National Crime Syndicate. Hogan himself owned the Green Lantern saloon on Wabasha Street, Saint Paul, which was also an illegal gambling casino, and became a speakeasy during Prohibition. Hogan was involved in planning armed robberies in the towns surrounding the Twin Cities, and also in money laundering and casino gambling in the Minneapolis-Saint Paul area.

In an interview with Paul Maccabee, retired journalist Fred Heaberlin recalled, "Danny Hogan... today he'd probably be called a Godfather, sort of a father figure for hoods who were climbing the world of hoodlumism."

In a 1927 memo, the U.S. Justice Department alleged, "Hogan is a nationally know character as a 'fence' for the disposal of stolen property and undoubtedly hundreds of thousands of dollars of stolen stamps and bonds and other valuable property have come into his hands... He is doubtless one of the most resourceful and keenest criminals in the United States and has always been able to cover his tracks so as to avoid detection."

In his memoir Robbing Banks was my Business, Harvey Bailey described how he regularly went to Hogan, who regularly laundered the money and bonds from Bailey's armed robberies. Bailey praised Hogan as a trustworthy, principled, and honorable gangster. According to Bailey, Danny Hogan's word, once given, was good.

== Murder ==
On December 4, 1928, Dapper Dan got behind the wheel of his Paige coupe in his garage at 1607 Seventh St W, Saint Paul, and turned on the ignition. A bomb located beneath the floorboards detonated and blew off his right leg. He slipped into a coma at the hospital and died nine hours after the blast.

Accompanied by $5,000 worth of lilies, roses, and gold and white chrysanthemums sent by criminal associates from the Twin Cities, Chicago, and New York City, Hogan received a funeral worthy of Prohibition-era Chicago and was buried in Calvary Cemetery in St. Paul's North End. Following the funeral, Chicago North Side Gang leader Bugs Moran personally stood guard outside the Hogan family residence at West Seventh Street, apparently to protect his fallen friend's family from further attacks.

The boss' widow, Leila Hogan, was heard to say, however, "I am sure there will be justice. If Danny had lived, he would have gone on the one leg they left him and taken care of it himself."

Although the murder is still considered unsolved, recently declassified FBI files reveal that the most likely person responsible was Jewish-American mobster and longtime Hogan associate Harry Sawyer.

According to declassified FBI interviews with his ex-wife Rita Gladys Sawyer, Harry Sawyer believed that Hogan had cheated him out of a $36,000 cut from an illegal gambling casino they jointly ran at the Hollywood Inn in Mendota, Minnesota. In addition, Harry Sawyer had contributed $25,000 to Hogan's bail in 1927, after the boss had been indicted for masterminding the 1924 armed robbery of $35,000 from the Chicago Great Western Railroad station at South St. Paul. To Sawyer's undying fury, Hogan had never repaid him.

In an interview with Paul Maccabee, Hogan's niece, Anne Michaud, recalled, "Uncle Danny knew who had killed him, but he'd never tell his family, because he was afraid the gangsters would come after us."

Hogan's death is especially notable because it was one of the first instances in the National Crime Syndicate of a crime boss being murdered by a car bomb. After the funeral, Sawyer took over Hogan's former position as boss of St. Paul's underworld and, with the help of mobbed up police chief Big Tom Brown, masterminded a violent crime spree that, according to Paul Maccabee, would have horrified Danny Hogan.
