= Sandy Dvore =

American artist (1934–2020)

- Born: Sanford Dvore; August 28, 1934; Chicago, Illinois, U.S.
- Died: November 20, 2020 (aged 86)
- Burial place: Westlawn Cemetery
- Occupations: Graphic designer, motion picture main title designer, graphic artist

Sanford Dvore (August 28, 1934 – November 20, 2020) was an American artist, graphic designer, and title designer.

== Biography ==
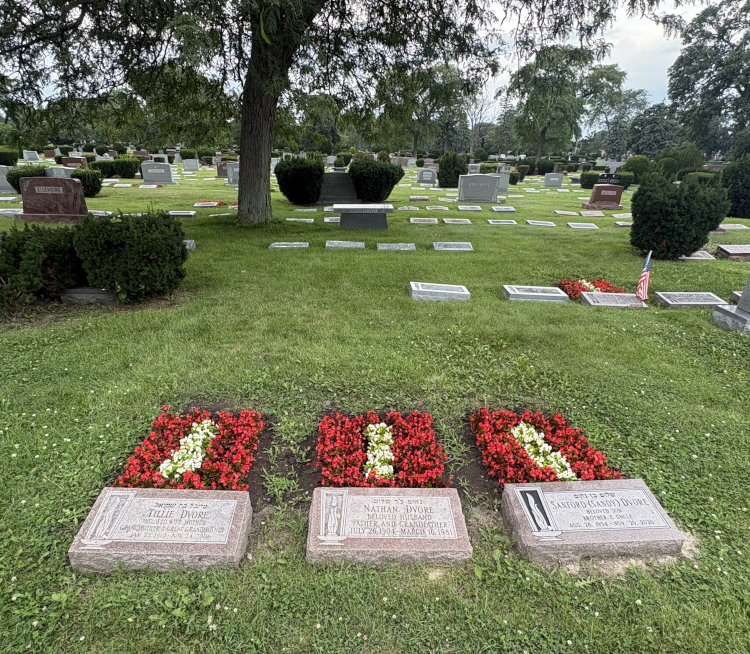
Dvore's grave (right) at Westlawn Cemetery

Sandy Dvore was born in Chicago, Illinois where he studied at the American Academy of Art from 1953-1954. He moved to California in 1958, aspiring to be an actor.

Around 1962, he met Hollywood publicist Guy McElwaine playing baseball, who represented Natalie Wood, Warren Beatty, Judy Garland and Tony Bennett and needed ads created. Through this connection, Dvore became well known for designing back cover art for Sammy Davis Jr. in Variety. Dvore then illustrated an ad for Judy Garland for Judy at Carnegie Hall which caught the attention of American theatrical agent and film producer Freddie Fields. The pair worked together for 13 years on numerous projects. Dvore would go on to illustrate hundreds of ads for stars like Frank Sinatra, Liza Minnelli, Natalie Wood, David Bowie, Mick Jagger, and Steve McQueen. His minimal but vibrant illustrated trade ads held the coveted back pages of The Hollywood Reporter and Variety for years.

Sandy Dvore is best known for his work in designing television title sequences, such as the walking partridges in The Partridge Family, and the brush-stroke logo and paintings from the long-running soap opera The Young and the Restless. His film title credits include the 1970 film The Dunwich Horror, the 1972 Blaxploitation thriller Blaculaand the 1976 film Lipstick. He also designed the opening credits for selected seasons of the nighttime soap opera Knots Landing.

Dvore's work in graphic design won him an Emmy Award in 1987 for Carol, Carl, Whoopi and Robin.

Dvore died from bone cancer at his home on the evening of November 20, 2020. He was buried at Westlawn Cemetery in Norridge, Illinois.

== Logo design ==
- United Artists
- Picturemaker Productions
- International Creative Management (ICM)
- Los Angeles International Film Exhibition (Filmex)
- Solo Cup Company
- Lorimar
- The Komack Company

== Television title sequences ==
- Knots Landing (1987–1989 TV series; main titles design)
- The Young and the Restless (1973–1988 drawings and 1984-1999 logo)
- A Hobo's Christmas (1987 TV movie; title designer)
- Sister Margaret and the Saturday Night Ladies (1987 TV movie; main title designer)
- North and South, Book II (1986 TV miniseries; title designer: main titles)
- North and South (1985 TV miniseries; drawings)
- The Waltons (1973-1981 TV series; main title designer)
- The Partridge Family (1970–1974 TV series; main title designer)
- The Bold Ones: The New Doctors (1972-1973 TV series; main title design)
- James Dean (1976 TV movie; illustrator: main titles)
- Breaking Up Is Hard to Do (1979 TV movie; title designer: main titles)
- Police Story (1974–1978 TV series; graphic artist)
- Jennifer Slept Here (1983-1984 TV series; main title design)

== Filmography ==
- Lipstick (1976; design graphics)
- For Pete's Sake (1974; title designer)
- Jonathan Livingston Seagull (1973; visual consultant)
- Scream Blacula Scream (1973; title designer)
- Blacula (1972; title designer)
- De Sade (1969; title designer)
- The Dunwich Horror (1970; title designer)
- Three in the Attic (1968; titles)
- Skidoo (1968; titles)
