= Mike Nussbaum =

American actor and director (1923–2023)

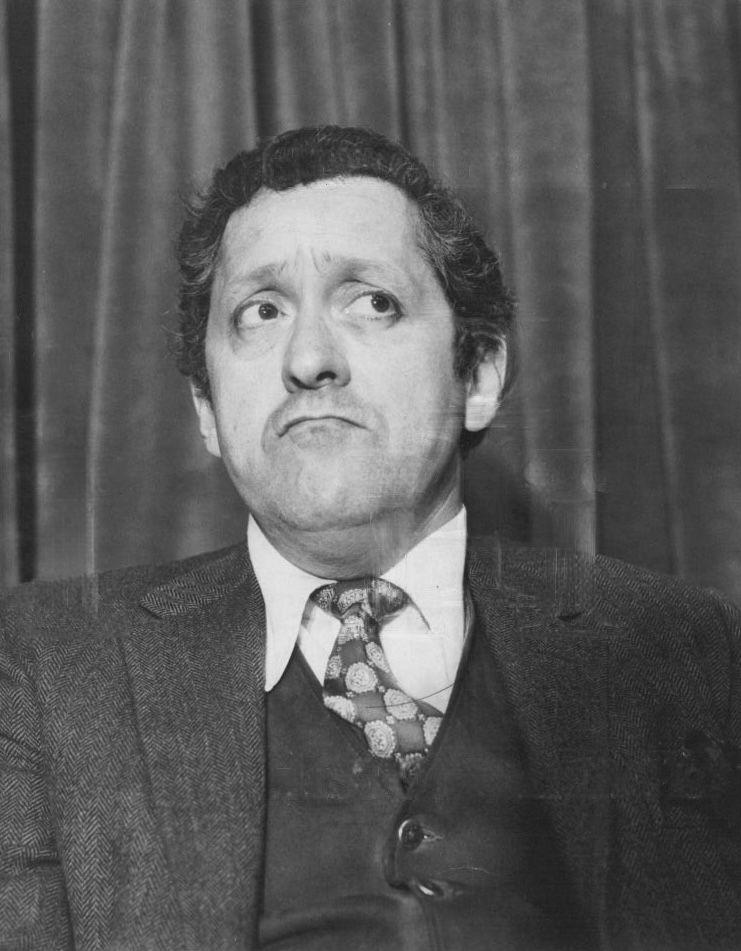
- Nussbaum in 1974
- Born: Myron Nussbaum; December 29, 1923; New York City, U.S.
- Died: December 23, 2023 (aged 99); Chicago, Illinois, U.S.
- Occupations: Actor, director
- Years active: 1950–2023
- Spouses: Annette Brenner (m. 1949; died 2003) Julie Brudlos (m. 2004)
- Children: 3, including Susan and Karen

Myron G. Nussbaum (December 29, 1923 – December 23, 2023) was an American actor and director.

== Early years ==
Myron Nussbaum (he adopted "G." while in the Army, to avoid the "no middle initial" descriptor in roll call) was born in New York City to a Jewish family on December 29, 1923, and grew up in the Albany Park area of Chicago. He married soon after he returned to Chicago following military service during World War II. His Army assignments included being chief of the message center for General Dwight D. Eisenhower, in which he dispatched the official notification of Germany's surrender. For 20 years, he worked with his brother-in-law in an extermination business.

== Career ==
Nussbaum's acting career started in community theatre in the 1950s. In the 1960s, he was active in a developing professional theatrical community in Chicago, meeting a young David Mamet in the process. He appeared in many of Mamet's plays both on and off Broadway, as well as in Chicago. His films include Field of Dreams, House of Games, Things Change, Fatal Attraction and Men in Black.

As a director, his work has included Where Have You Gone, Jimmy Stewart? (2002) by Art Shay.

Nussbaum also appeared in local TV commercials for Chicago's Northwest Federal Savings (with the jingle, "It's Northwest Federal Savings time, sixty-three hours a week"). He also did national commercials for United Airlines and Scope mouthwash.

Nussbaum continued to act through his 90s, and he was still working on theatre projects up until his death in 2023.

== Personal life and death ==
Nussbaum was married to Annette Brenner from 1949 until her death in 2003. He married Julie Brudlos in 2004. He had three children with his first wife, Jack, Karen, and Susan.

Nussbaum died at his Chicago home on December 23, 2023, six days shy of his 100th birthday.

== Recognition ==
Nussbaum received the following Jeff Awards:

Year	Award	Play
1977	Director - Play	Lunching
1997	Actor in a Principal Role - Play	Racing Demon
2001	Special Award	---
2011	Actor in a Supporting Role - Play	Broadway Bound
2014	Actor in a Supporting Role - Play	Smokefall
2015	Actor in a Supporting Role - Play	The Price

== Filmography ==
=== Film ===
Mike Nussbaum film credits
Year	Title	Role
1997	Early Edition	Yuri Rosanov
1969	The Monitors	Exercise Chief
1971	T.R. Baskin	Office Manager
1974	Harry and Tonto	Old Age Home Clerk
1978	Towing	Phil
1987	House of Games (film)	Joey
1987	Fatal Attraction	Bob Drimmer
1988	Things Change	Mr. Green
1989	Field of Dreams	Principal
1990	Desperate Hours	Mr. Nelson
1992	Gladiator	Doctor
1995	Losing Isaiah	Dr. Jamison
1995	Steal Big Steal Little	Sam Barlow, Clifford Downey's Attorney
1997	Men In Black	Gentle Rosenberg
2005	The Game of Their Lives	Johnny Abruzzo
2006	Dirty Work	Gaga
2008	Osso Bucco	Uncle Sil
2020	Tom of Your Life	Father McMurphy

=== Television ===
Mike Nussbaum television credits
Year	Title	Role	Notes
1987	The Equalizer	Harry Dawson	Episode: "First Light"
1992–1996	The Commish	Ben Metzger	3 episodes
1993	Love, Honor & Obey: The Last Mafia Marriage	Gaspar DiGregorio	TV movie
1993	Gypsy	Weber, Los Angeles Theatre Manager	TV movie
1997	The X-Files	Dr. Charles Goldstein	1 episode
1997	Early Edition	Yuri Rosanov	TV movie
