= J. C. Price High School =

Historic school building in North Carolina, United States

- J.C. Price High School
- U.S. National Register of Historic Places
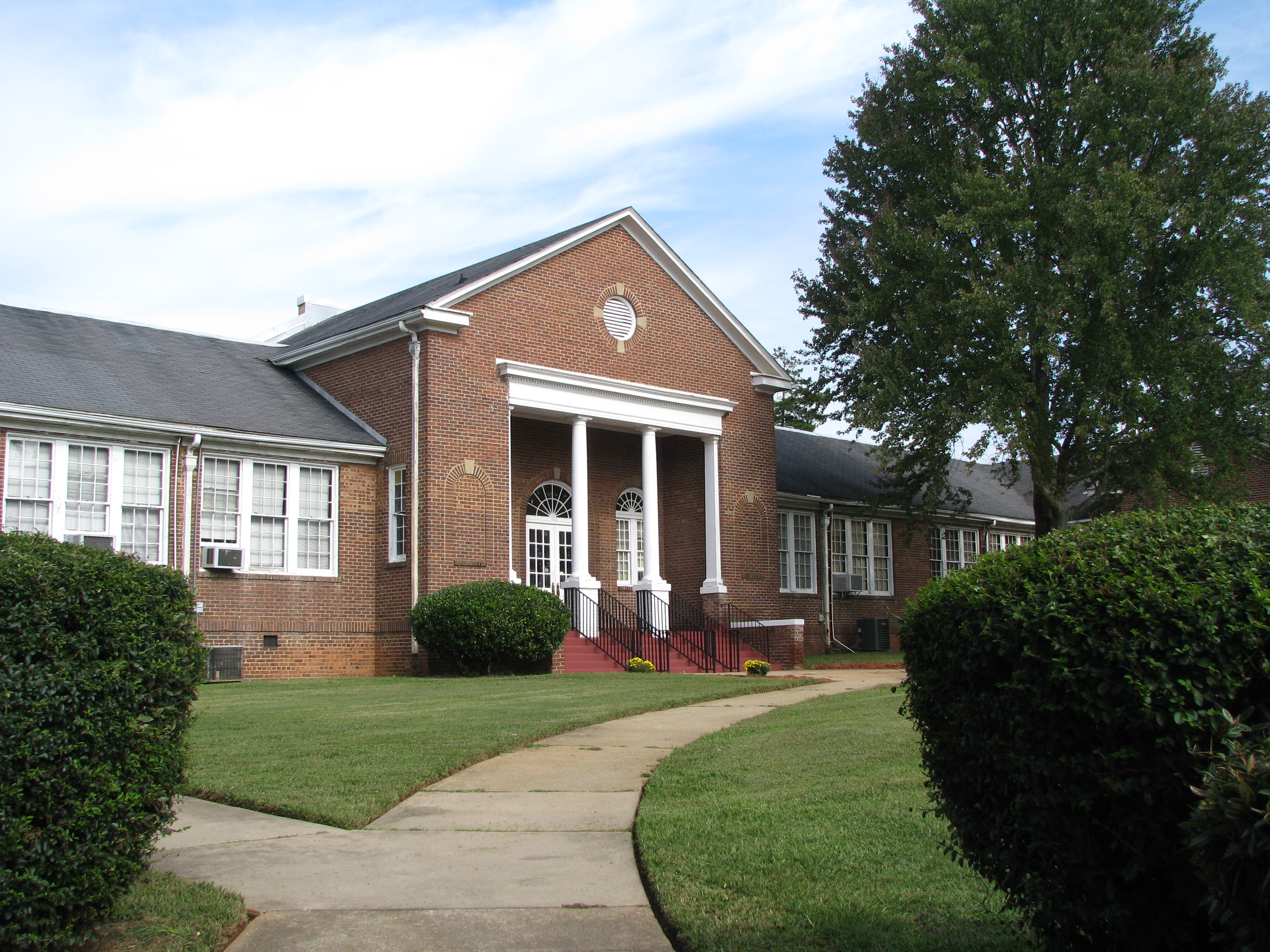
- J.C. Price High School, September 2012

- Location within North Carolina Location within the United States
- Location: 1300-1400 W. Bank St., Salisbury, North Carolina
- Coordinates: 35°40′37″N 80°29′45″W
- Area: 9.5 acres (3.8 ha)
- Built: 1932, 1947, 1969
- Architect: Barbee and Yoe
- Architectural style: Colonial Revival, Modern Movement
- NRHP reference No.: 10000208
- Added to NRHP: April 21, 2010

J.C. Price High School, also known as the Joseph Charles Price High School, is a historic high school complex located at Salisbury, Rowan County, North Carolina. The school served as Salisbury's high school for African-American students from 1932 through the 1968–1969 school year. It was listed on the National Register of Historic Places in 2010.

J. C. Price High School was originally housed in the Monroe Street School. The Rosenwald Fund supported the construction of a school building with a grant of $5,300. A gymnasium was built in 1951, a classroom building was built parallel to the original building in 1956–1957, and cafeteria in 1956–1957

The complex consists of four symmetrically positioned one-story brick buildings built between 1931 and 1957. The original building was built in 1931–1932, and is an H-shaped, Colonial Revival-style brick building.
