= Mary Anderson (labor leader) =

Labor activist and an advocate for women in the workplace

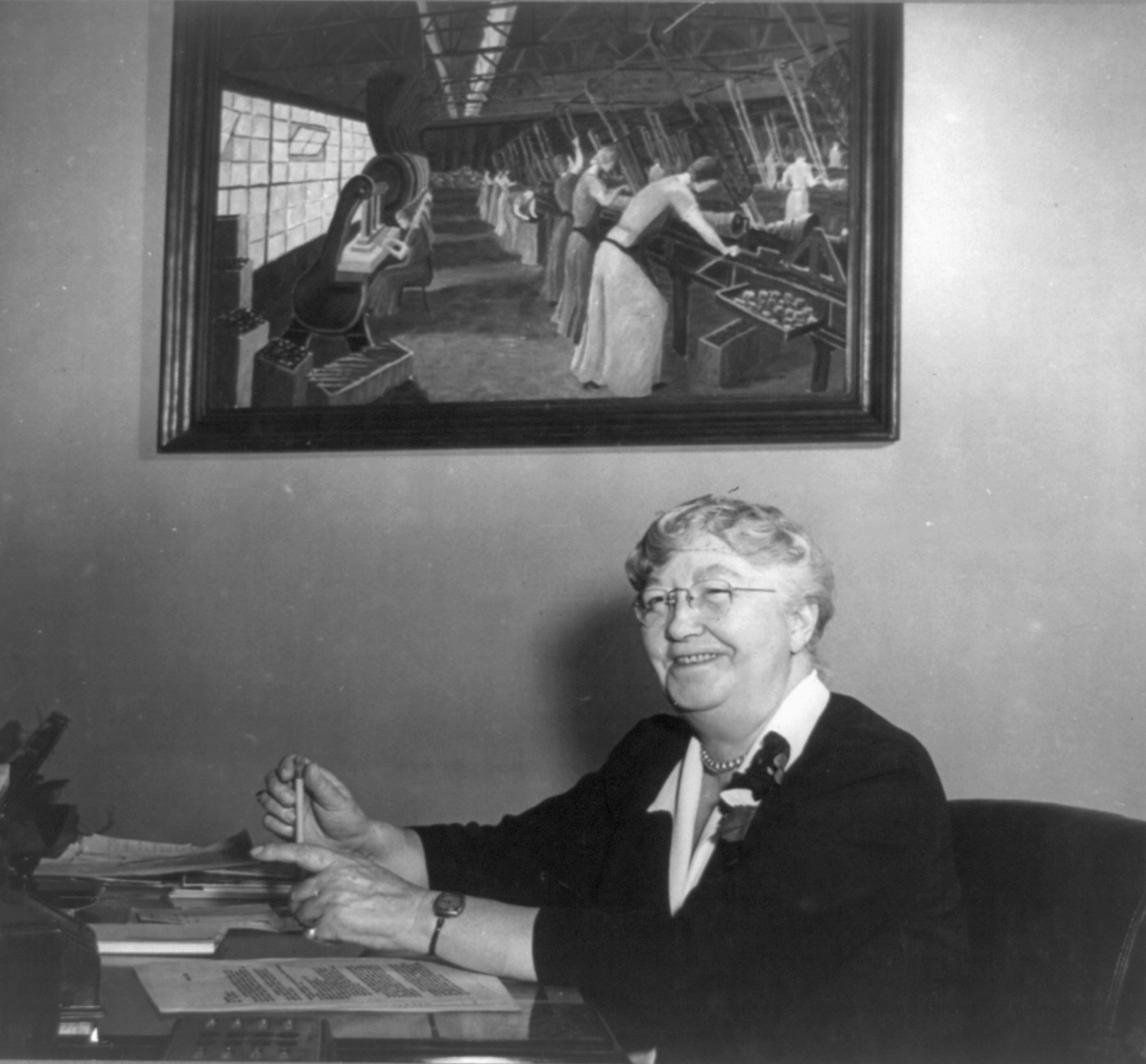

Director of the United States Women's Bureau
- In office 1920–1944
- President: Woodrow Wilson; Warren Harding; Calvin Coolidge; Herbert Hoover; Franklin D. Roosevelt
- Preceded by: Position created
- Succeeded by: Frieda S. Miller

Personal details
- Born: August 27, 1872 Lidköping, Sweden
- Died: 1964

Mary Anderson (August 27, 1872 – 1964) was a Swedish-born American labor activist and an advocate for women in the workplace. A feminist, she rallied support to ratify many new laws to support women and equal rights. Throughout her lifetime, Anderson held a large range of roles, rising from a factory worker to the Director of the Women's Bureau in the United States Department of Labor. Anderson's work to protect the rights of women in the workplace made no small impact on the lives of working women across the country.

== Biography ==
=== Introduction ===
Mary Anderson was born in Lidköping, Sweden 1872, daughter of Magnus and Matilda (Johnson) Anderson. She emigrated to the United States when she was sixteen in 1888. Once in America she worked as a dishwasher at a lumberjacks' boarding house in Ludington, Michigan. She moved to Chicago where she worked in a garment factory and as a shoe stitcher in West Pullman. She joined the Boot and Shoe Workers Union and was elected president of the women's stitchers Local 94 in 1900. She became a leader in the Women's Trade Union League in Chicago, Illinois. She gained valuable experience from the Women's Trade Union League in public administration. She then applied these skills to her work with the Women's Bureau in the U.S. Department of Labor which she was the first director of in 1920. She directed and used the Bureau for 25 years to better the working conditions, wages, and hours for women. And even once she retired from office Mary Anderson continued to fight for the rights of working women.

=== Woman's Trade Union League 1900–1919 ===
The main goal of this league was to organize women and to gain support for a union. This union would strive to get safer factory conditions for women workers. Mary Anderson had first hand experience of the very dangerous working conditions of the factory floor and knew things had to be improved.

It was during Anderson's time in the WTUL that's she began a friendship with Jane Addams who would greatly influence Anderson's views on helping all people, not just women. In Anderson's eulogy to Addams she tells of how, "'She was not one of those feminist who are for women alone. Her heart and her brilliant mind recognized that as long as one group could be exploited society as a whole must suffer'". Anderson too believed that the work of feminists should not be constrained to only women's issues but more importantly address broader social concerns.

40,000 garment workers went on strike in Chicago in 1910. This was Anderson's and the WTUL chance to organize these women and to use the tactics of the male unions to gain better pay for pant makers and better working conditions. During the strike the main goal of the WTUL was to relieve distress of families by donating food clothes and coal to those who were not getting paid and had very little money saved up.

The strike seemed to be working as employers were beginning to give in to the demands for collective bargaining of the garment workers. However the strike was abruptly called off by the United Garment Workers without any forewarning. Anderson was disappointed and shocked. She felt that for how much people endured through the strike they gained very little from their suffering. This failure of the method of collective organization to achieve the WTUL's goals in the garment strike would affect Anderson's views later on in her political career. She defiantly rejected of the National Woman's Party proposed Equal Rights Amendment and embraced the idea of Social Justice Feminism.

=== Women's Bureau of the U.S. Department of Labor 1920–1944 ===
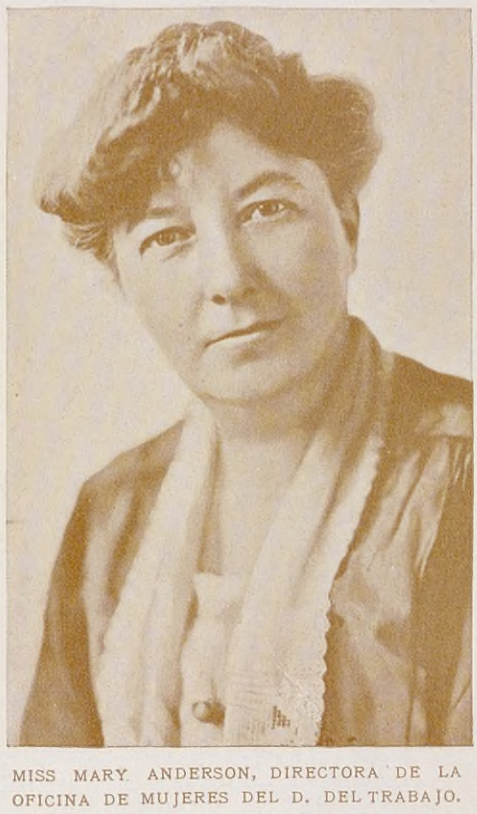
Mary Anderson in the Argentine magazine Plus Ultra, February of 1922.

Mary Anderson became the head of the Women's Bureau in March 1920, replacing her friend and fellow activist Mary van Kleeck. She was going to lead the Bureau and use its influence to advance her agenda of Social Justice Feminism. Social Justice Feminism is using legislation to bring social justice and improvement of lives. The ultimate goal was to use women's labor legislation to set precedents so that the state would protect all workers, male and female, from the very real oppressions of the employer in the work place. Here you can see Addams influence on Anderson, with her goal to help society at large, not just women.

However, after World War I and the ratification of the 19th Amendment there was a rhetorical reform going through government of Administrative Orthodoxy, that placed an emphasis on scientific objectivity and expertise as the criteria for action within the Bureaucracy. Men in government argued that because women now had equal say in voting on policies that there was no need for gender specific legislation based on old ideals of women's subordination to men and thus needing their own gendered protection in the law. By today's standard, 2012, these men in government would appear to be in consensus with modern feminists. However, the reality was even with the vote women were still oppressed by their lower wage than men and conditions in the factory were still horrible as Anderson saw firsthand when she toured the U.S. war factories in 1917. Mary Anderson had to figure out a way to pass legislation that would bring social justice and protect women from the realities of factory work while battling with the ideology of Administrative Orthodoxy.

From her life experiences, of first hand factory work, witnessing the Chicago garment worker strike, actively engaged in the work of the WTUL, and her factory tour in 1917, Mary Anderson could arguably be called an expert on Women's struggle in the factory. All that was left to do to fulfill the Administrative Orthodoxy requirements was to have the expert collect data, or scientific objectivity. This is precisely what the Women's Bureau did. One example was filing and publishing reports on African American female workers. By focusing the Bureau's efforts and minority groups that other public administrators' largely ignored Anderson was able to resolve her dilemma of getting legislative social justice for women while staying within the government's trend or Administrative Orthodoxy. Again we see Addams influence on Anderson, helping society at large by giving attention to ignored minority groups.

=== Women's Bureau vs. National Woman's Party and the Equal Rights Movement ===
Once the 19th Amendment was ratified and women received the vote the National Woman's Party set its sights on a new goal, an Equal Rights Amendment that would end all discrimination against women. This included the social justice legislation that Anderson and the Women's Bureau had gathered all that data and filed reports to enact in order to protect women. The NWP thought women should get equality in the work place by organizing into unions like men do. Anderson opposed this idea because of the anticlimactic end to the Chicago garment worker strike. The chasm here is one of ideal versus reality. The NWP had very strong ideological views of what it viewed as women's equality i.e. the ERA. However, the reality of the situation, as Anderson knew from scores of data collected by the Women's Bureau, was that not just women but all workers needed protection from harsh conditions allowed to exist in the factory. Mary Anderson would do all she could to prevent an Equal Rights Amendment from being ratified. Not because she thought women were weaker, but only because there was a real societal need for protective legislation.

Thus, through some tactical political maneuvering Mary Anderson was able to select who would head the NWP committee to study the effects of women specific labor legislation. She chose her close friend and committed social justice advocate Mary van Kleeck to be the technical advisor of the committee. Leaders on the NWP and Kleeck bickered and debated on every point making it virtually impossible for the committee to do anything. Eventually members on the committee who supported the ERA left the group, and the Women's Bureau and Mary Anderson successfully defended the policies they had worked so hard to enact.

=== After The Bureau 1945–1964 ===
Mary Anderson retired from the Women's Bureau in 1944. She never married, and did not end her efforts to gain woman's equality in the work place. She stayed active by lobbying Washington D.C. for equal pay for equal work by men and women in the factory. She became the legislative representative of the National Consumers League and again found statistical facts to point out the real abuses in wage discrimination against women in union contracts. While the unions preached the ideology of equal pay for equal work, they also had a "wage scale" which posed a reality of a set pay for men and a separate lower set pay for women. She goes on to state that with more women in the work force it is "simple justice", social justice, to give men and women equal pay for equal work.

Mary Anderson was the first "'up from the ranks" labor woman to head an executive department of the federal government. She served under five U.S. presidents during her tenure at the Women's Bureau. During this time, there was more than a doubling of the number of women working. She did everything in her, the Bureau's, and legislative power to protect the rights of working women.

== Autobiography ==
- Woman At Work: The Autobiography of Mary Anderson as Told to Mary N. Winslow (Minneapolis, MN: Minnesota Historical Society Press. 1951)

== See also ==
- Labor Hall of Honor
