= History of Vienna =

Historical affiliations

Duchy of Austria 1156–1453
Archduchy of Austria 1453–1485
Kingdom of Hungary 1485–1490
Archduchy of Austria 1490–1804
Austrian Empire 1804–1867
Austria-Hungary 1867–1918
First Austrian Republic 1919–1934
Federal State of Austria 1934–1938
German Reich 1938–1945
Allied-occupied Austria 1945–1955
Austria 1955–present

The history of Vienna has been long and varied, beginning when the Roman Empire created a military camp in the area now covered by Vienna's city centre. Vienna grew from the Roman settlement known as Vindobona to be an important trading site in the 11th century. It became the capital of the Babenberg Dynasty and subsequently of the Austrian Habsburgs, under whom it became one of Europe's cultural hubs. During the 19th century as the capital of the Austrian Empire and later Austria-Hungary, it temporarily became one of Europe's biggest cities. Since the end of World War I, Vienna has been the capital of the Republic of Austria.

== Beginnings and early Middle Ages ==
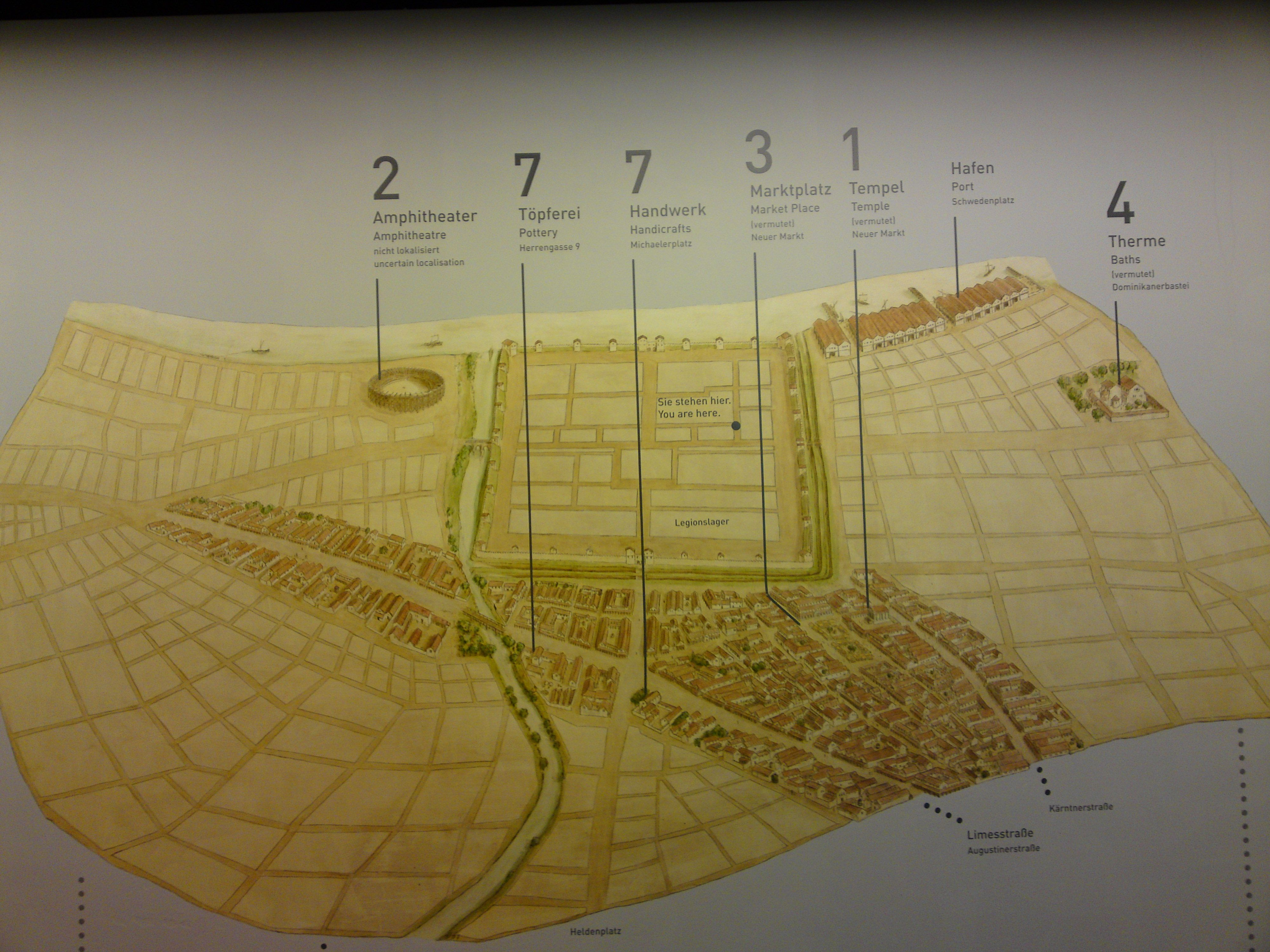
Overview of the Roman legion settlement Vindobona in the centre of today's Vienna

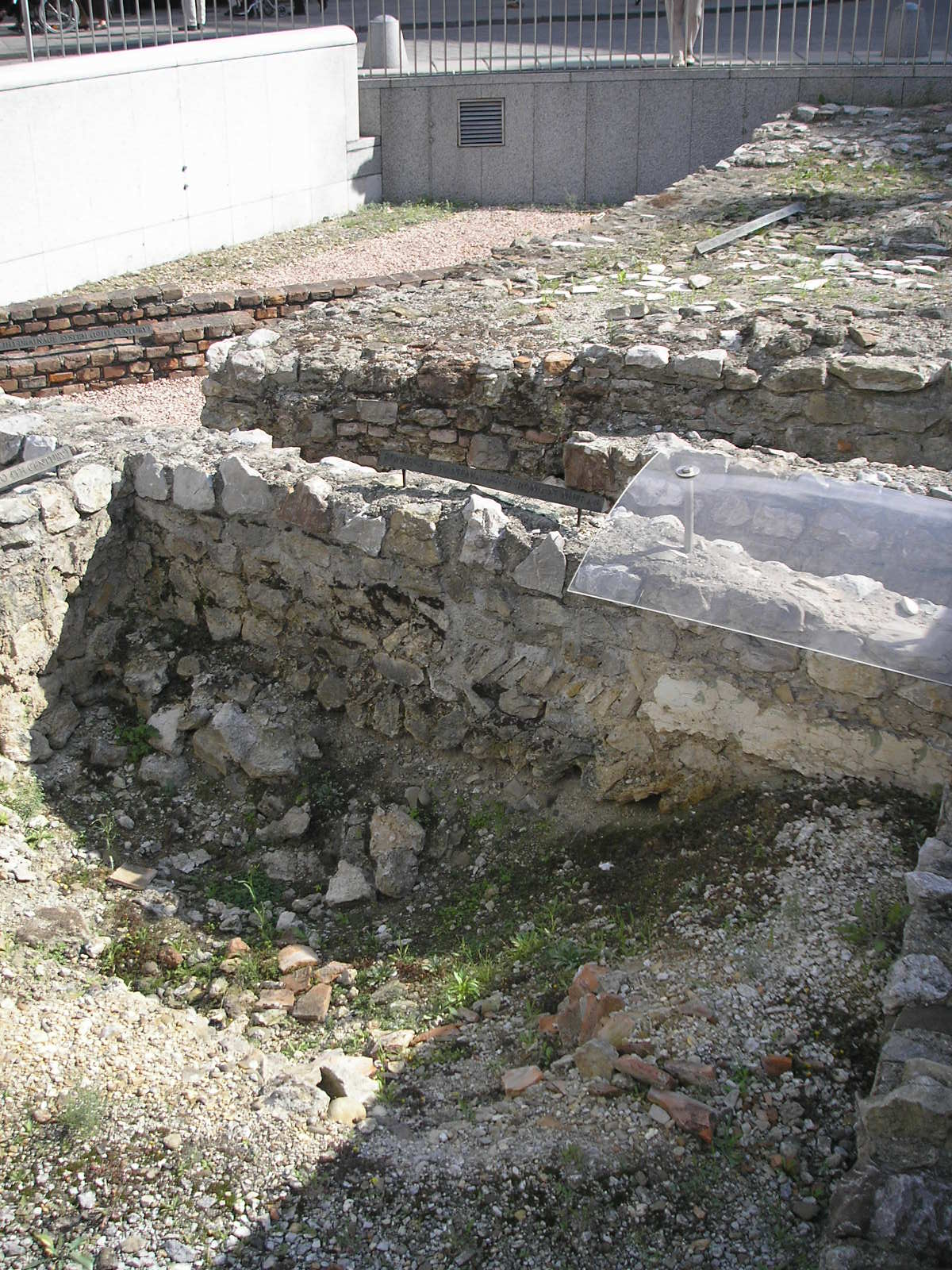
Roman ruins at Michaelerplatz

The name Vindobona derives from a Celtic language, suggesting that the region must have been inhabited before Roman times. The Romans created a military camp (occupied by Legio X Gemina) during the 1st century on the site of the city centre of present-day Vienna. The settlement was raised to the status of a municipium in 212. Even today, the streets of the First District show where the encampment placed its walls and moats. The Romans stayed until the 5th century.

Roman Vindobona was located in the outskirts of the empire and thus fell prey to the chaos of the Migration Period. There are some indications that a catastrophic fire occurred around the beginning of the 5th century. However, the remains of the encampment were not deserted, and a small settlement remained. The streets and houses of early medieval Vienna followed the former Roman walls, which gives rise to the conclusion that parts of the fortification were still in place and used by the settlers.

Byzantine copper coins from the 6th century have been found several times in the area of today's city centre, indicating considerable trade activity. Graves from the 6th century were found during excavations next to the Berghof, in an area around Salvatorgasse. At that time, the Lombards controlled the area, with Slavs and Avars following later. Early Vienna was centred on the Berghof.

The first documented mention of the city during the Middle Ages is within the Salzburg Annals, dating to 881, when a battle apud Weniam was fought against the Magyars. However, it is unclear whether this refers to the city or the River Wien.

== Babenberg rule ==
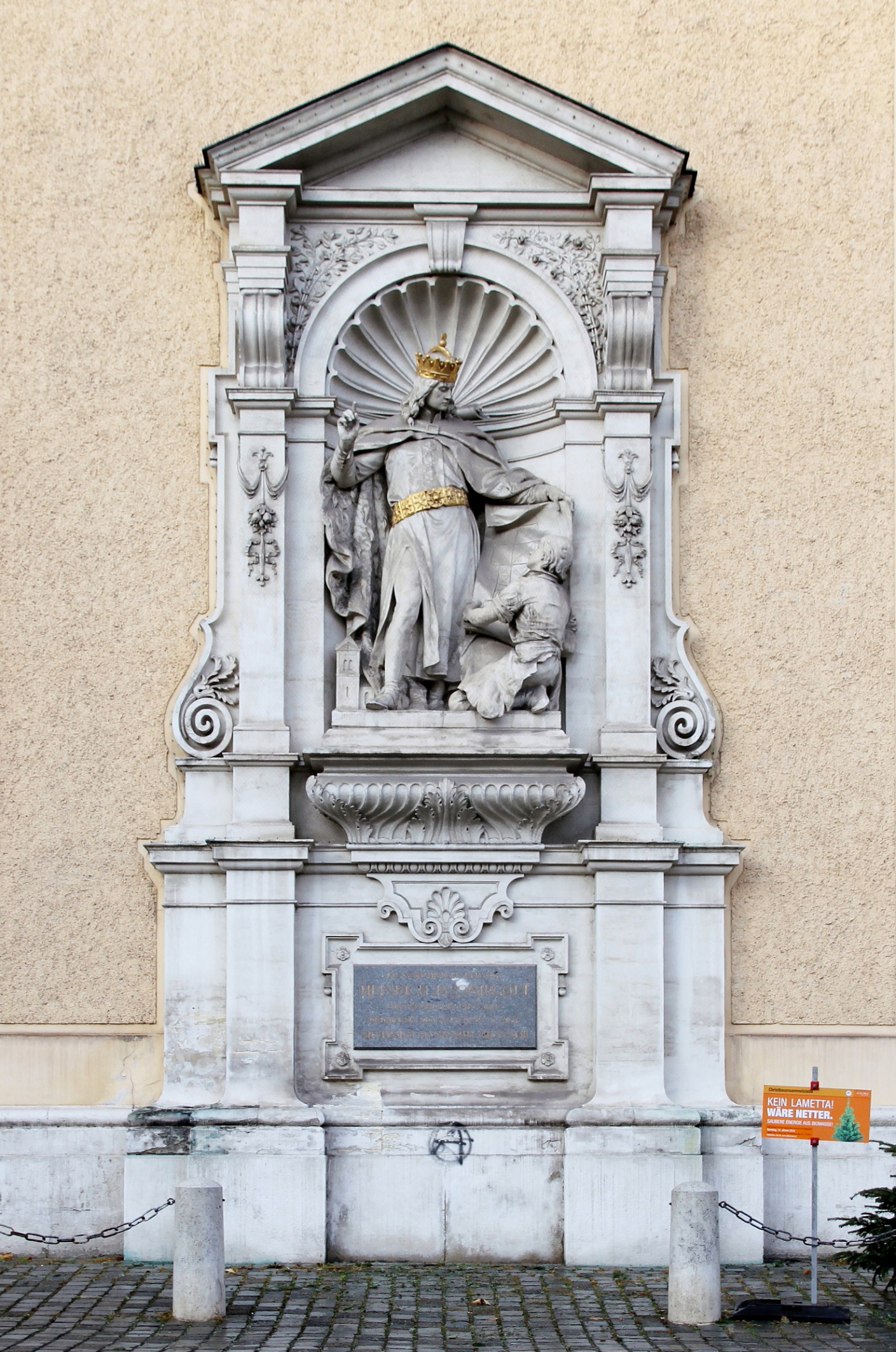
Duke Henry II of the Babenberg dynasty elevated Vienna to his capital in 1155.

In 976, the Margraviate of Ostarrîchi was given to the Babenberg family. Vienna lay at its border with Hungary.

Vienna was an important site of trade as early as the 11th century. In the Exchange of Mautern (German: Tauschvertrag von Mautern) between the Bishop of Passau and Margrave Leopold IV, Vienna is mentioned as a Civitas for the first time, which indicates the existence of a well-ordered settlement. In 1155, Margrave Henry II of Austria made Vienna his capital. In 1156, Austria was raised to a duchy in the Privilegium Minus, with Vienna becoming the seat of all future dukes. During that time, the Schottenstift was founded.

The events surrounding the Third Crusade, during which King Richard the Lionheart was discovered and captured by Duke Leopold V the Virtuous two days before Christmas of 1192 in Erdberg near Vienna, brought an enormous ransom of 50,000 Silver Marks (about 10 to 12 tons of silver, about a third of the emperor's claims against the English. Richard had been extradited to him in March 1193). This allowed the creation of a mint and the construction of city walls around the year 1200. At the U-Bahn station Stubentor, some remains of the city walls can still be seen today. Because he had abused a protected crusader, Leopold V was excommunicated by Pope Celestine III, and died (without having been absolved) after falling from a horse in a tournament.

In 1221, Vienna received the rights of a city and as a staple port (Stapelrecht). This meant that all traders passing through Vienna had to offer their goods in the city. This allowed the Viennese to act as middlemen in trade, so that Vienna soon created a network of far-reaching trade relations, particularly along the Danube basin and to Venice, and to become one of the most important cities in the Holy Roman Empire.

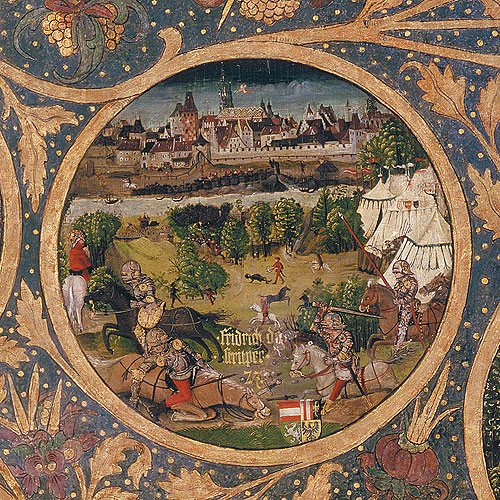
Frederick II with Vienna in the background (Babenberger family tree, 1489-1492)

However, it was considered embarrassing that Vienna did not have its own bishop. It is known that Duke Frederick II negotiated about the creation of a bishopric in Vienna, and the same is suspected of Ottokar II of Bohemia.

== Habsburg rule ==
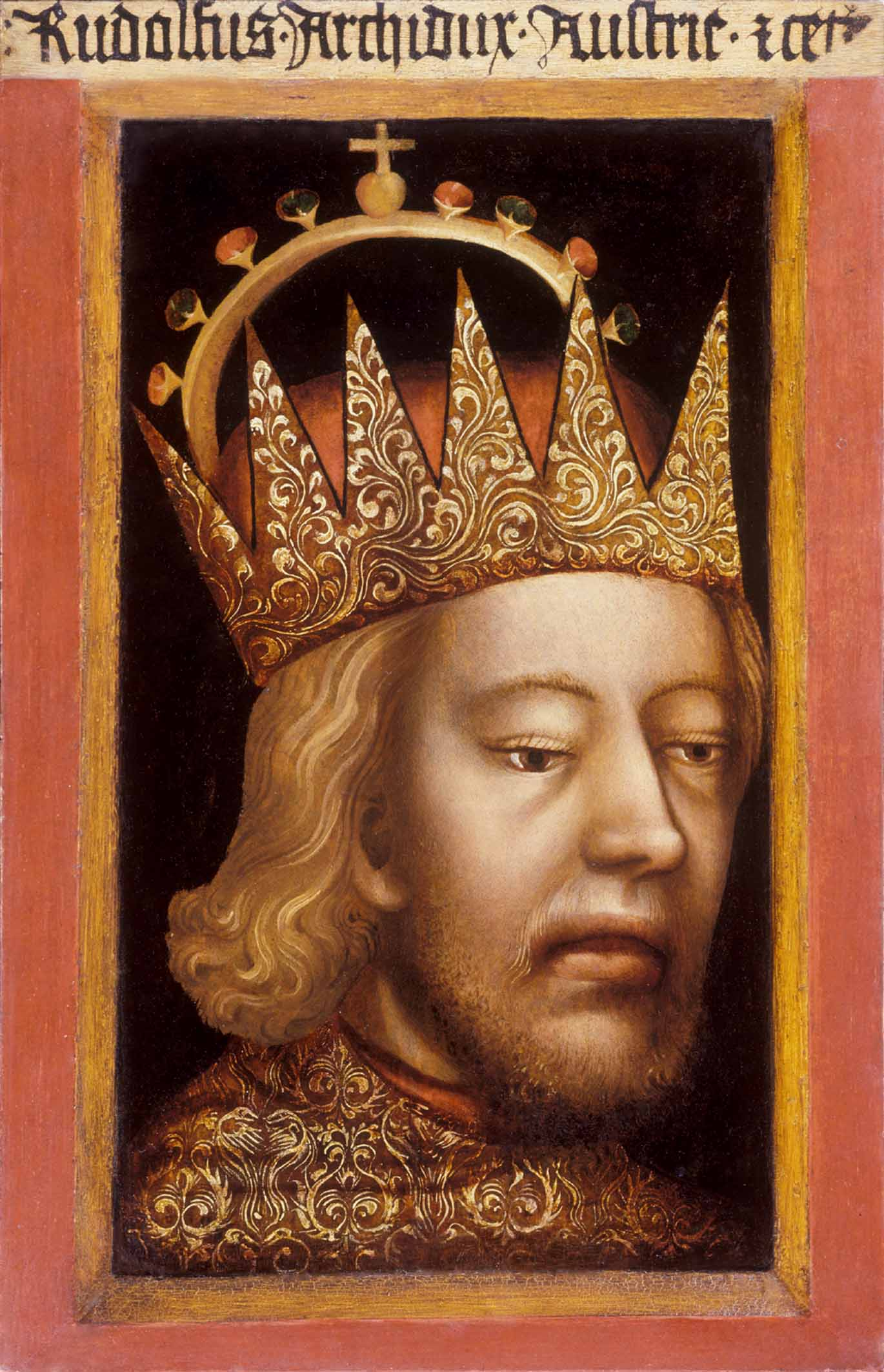
Duke Rudolf IV of Austria, known as "the Founder", did much to expand the city.

In 1278, Rudolf I took control over the Austrian lands after his victory over Ottokar II of Bohemia and began to establish Habsburg rule. In Vienna, it took a relatively long time for the Habsburgs to establish their control, because partisans of Ottokar remained strong for a long time. There were several uprisings against Albert I. The family of the Paltrams vom Stephansfreithof was foremost among the insurgents.

In 1280, Jans der Enikel wrote the "Fürstenbuch", a first history of the city.

With the Luxembourg emperors, Prague became the imperial residence and Vienna stood in its shadow. The early Habsburgs attempted to extend it in order to keep up. Duke Albert II, for example, had the gothic choir of the Stephansdom built. In 1327, Frederick the Handsome published his edict allowing the city to maintain an Eisenbuch (iron book) listing its privileges.

The combination of the heraldic eagle with the city coat of arms showing a white cross in a red field is found on a seal dated 1327. This heraldic emblem was in use throughout the 14th century in different variants.

Rudolf IV of Austria deserves credit for his prudent economic policy, which raised the level of prosperity. His epithet the Founder is due to two things: first, he founded the University of Vienna in 1365, and second, he began the construction of the gothic nave in the Stephansdom. The latter is connected to the creation of a metropolitan chapter, as a symbolic substitute for a bishop.

There was a period of inheritance disputes among the Habsburgs resulting not only in confusion, but also in an economic decline and social unrest, with disputes between the parties of patricians and artisans. While the patricians supported Ernest the Iron, the artisans supported Leopold IV. In 1408, the mayor Konrad Vorlauf, an exponent of the patrician party, was executed.

After the election of Duke Albert V as German King Albert II, Vienna became the capital of the Holy Roman Empire. Albert's name is remembered for his expulsion of the Jewish population of Vienna in 1421/22.

Eventually, in 1469, Vienna was given its own bishop, and the Stephansdom became a cathedral. During the upheavals of the era of Emperor Frederick III, Vienna remained on the side of his opponents (first Albert VI, then Matthias Corvinus), as Frederick proved unable to maintain peace in the land vis-à-vis rampaging gangs of mercenaries (often remaining from the Hussite Wars).

In 1485, the Hungarian King Matthias Corvinus and the Black Army of Hungary conquered the city and Vienna became the king's seat that served as the capital of Hungary until 1490.

In 1522, under Ferdinand I, Holy Roman Emperor the Blood Judgment of Wiener Neustadt led to the execution of leading members of the opposition within the city, and thus a destruction of the political structures. From then on, the city stood under direct imperial control.

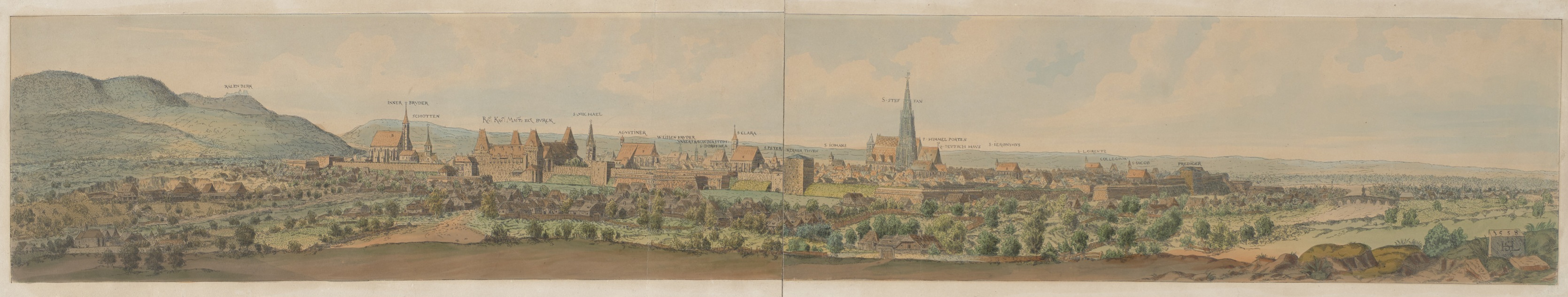
Panorama of Vienna from the south, 1558 (reproduction)

In 1556, Vienna became the seat of the Holy Roman Emperor, with Bohemia having been added to the Habsburg realm in 1526.

During this time, the city was also recatholicised after having become Protestant rather quickly. In 1551, the Jesuits were brought to town and soon gained a large influence in court. The leader of the Counter-Reformation here was Melchior Khlesl, Bishop of Vienna from 1600.

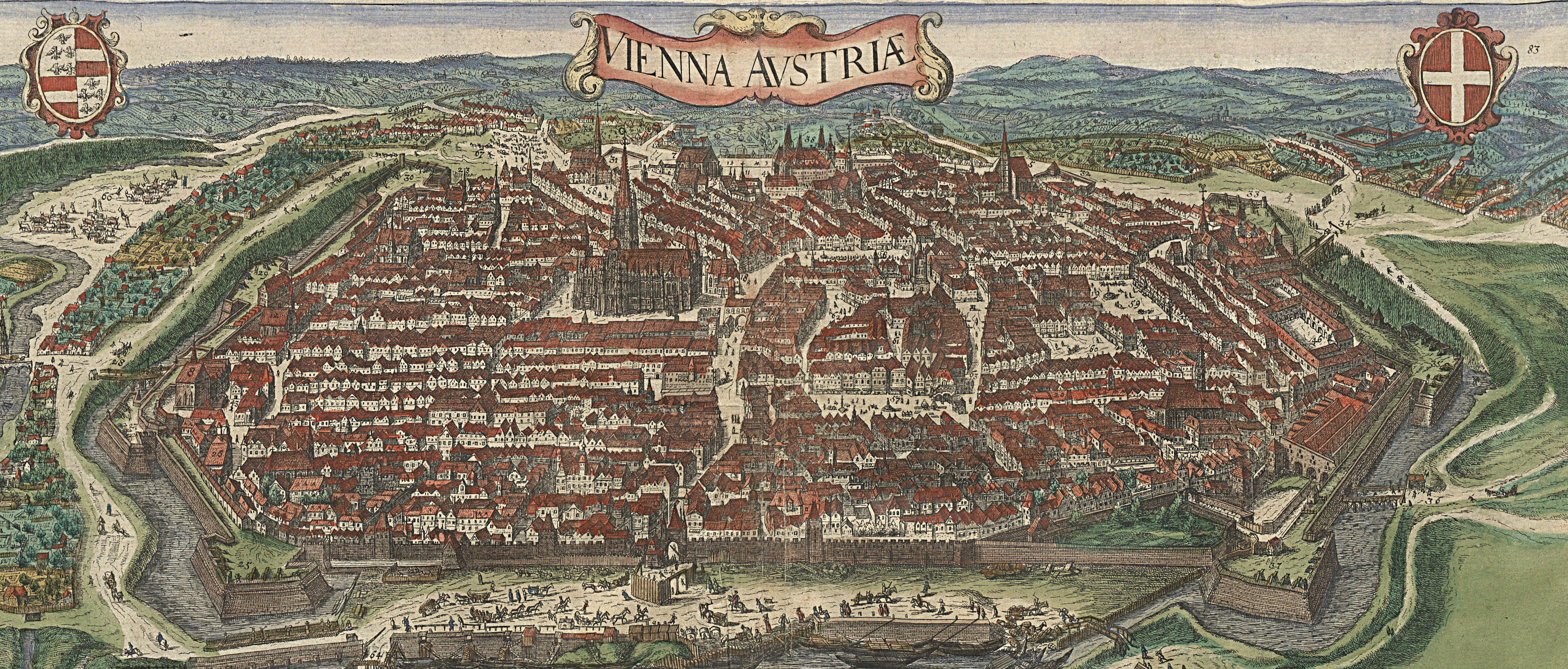
Panoramic view of Vienna after the city walls were reconstructed in 1548. In the middle is St Stephen's Cathedral, behind the medieval Hofburg complex. Right next to it the Minoritenkirche and to the far right Schottenstift with the Schottentor gate.

=== Turkish sieges ===
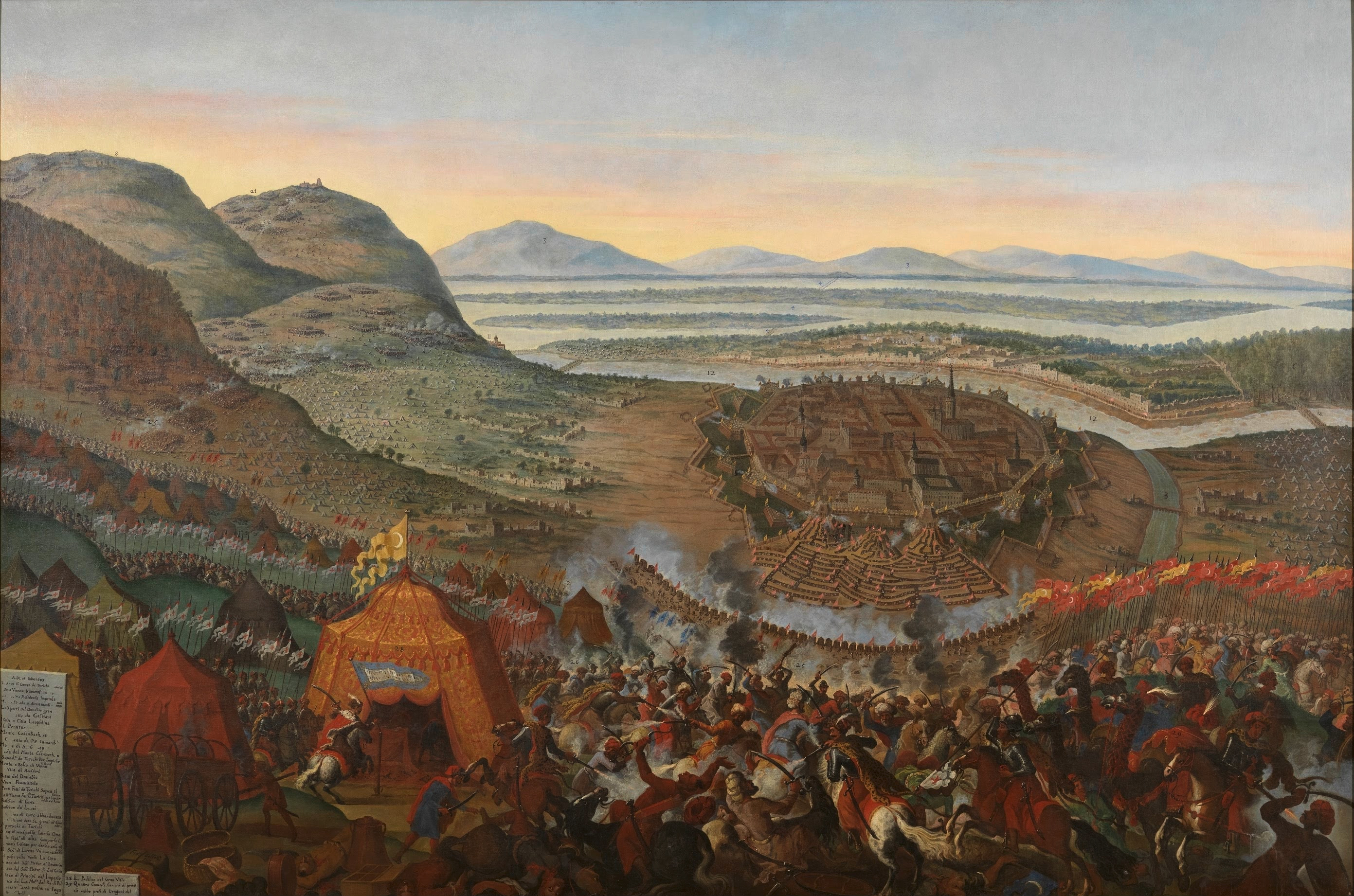
Siege of Vienna in 1683, painting by Frans Geffels

In 1529, Vienna was besieged by the Ottoman Turks for the first time (the First Turkish Siege), although unsuccessfully. The city, protected by medieval walls, only barely withstood the attacks, until epidemics and an early winter forced the Turks to retreat. The siege had shown that new fortifications were needed. Following plans by Sebastian Schrantz, Vienna was expanded to a fortress in 1548. The city was furnished with eleven bastions and surrounded by a moat. A glacis was created around Vienna, a broad strip without any buildings, which allowed defenders to fire freely. These fortifications, which accounted for the major part of building activities well into the 17th century, became decisive in the Second Turkish Siege of 1683, as they allowed the city to maintain itself for two months, until the Turkish army was defeated by the army led by the Polish King John III Sobieski. This was the turning point in the Turkish Wars, as the Ottoman Empire was pushed back more and more during the following decades.

=== 18th century ===
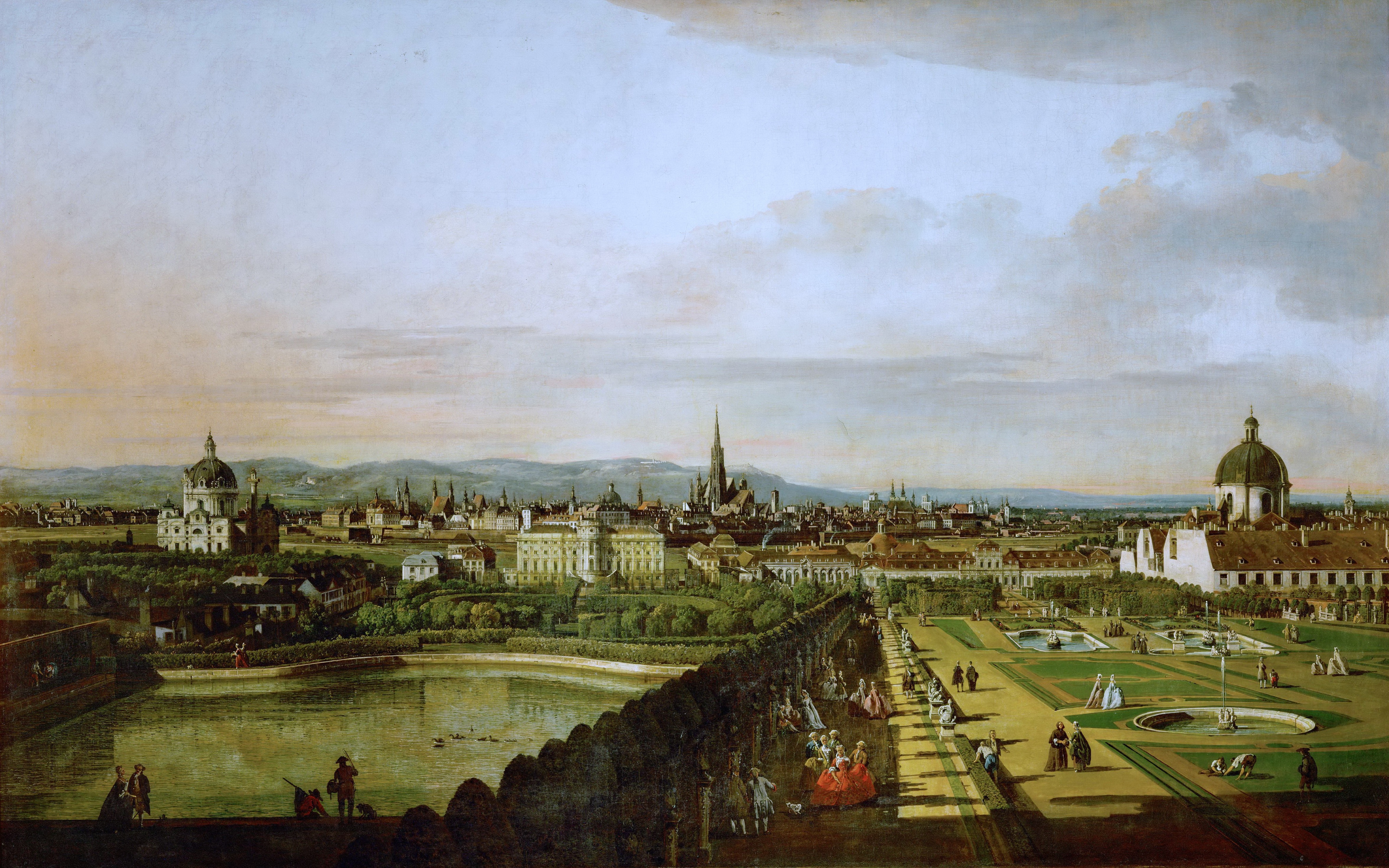
View of Vienna during the Baroque era, by Bernardo Bellotto

The following period was characterised by extensive building activities. In the course of reconstruction, Vienna was largely turned into a baroque city. The most important architects were Johann Bernhard Fischer von Erlach and Johann Lukas von Hildebrandt. Most construction happened in the suburbs (Vorstädte), as the nobility began to cover the surrounding land with garden palaces, known as Palais. The best known are the Palais Liechtenstein, Palais Modena, Schönbrunn Palace, Palais Schwarzenberg, and the Belvedere (the garden palais of Prince Eugene of Savoy). In 1704, an outer fortification, the Linienwall, was built around the Vorstädte.

After the extensive plague epidemics of 1679 and 1713, the population began to grow steadily. It is estimated that 150,000 people lived in Vienna in 1724, and 200,000 in 1790. At that time, the first factories were built, starting in Leopoldstadt. Leopoldstadt also became a site where many Jews lived, as they had been driven out of their 50-year-old ghetto in 1670. Hygienic problems began to become noticeable: sewers and street cleaning began to develop. Also in this time, the first house numbers (the Konskriptionsnummern) were issued, and the government postal system began to develop.

Under Emperor Joseph II, the city administration was modernized in 1783: officials in charge of only the city were introduced, and the Magistrate was created (More information about the Magistrate of the City of Vienna specifically can be found in German at de:Magistrat der Stadt Wien.). At the same time, the graveyards within the city were closed.

=== 19th century ===
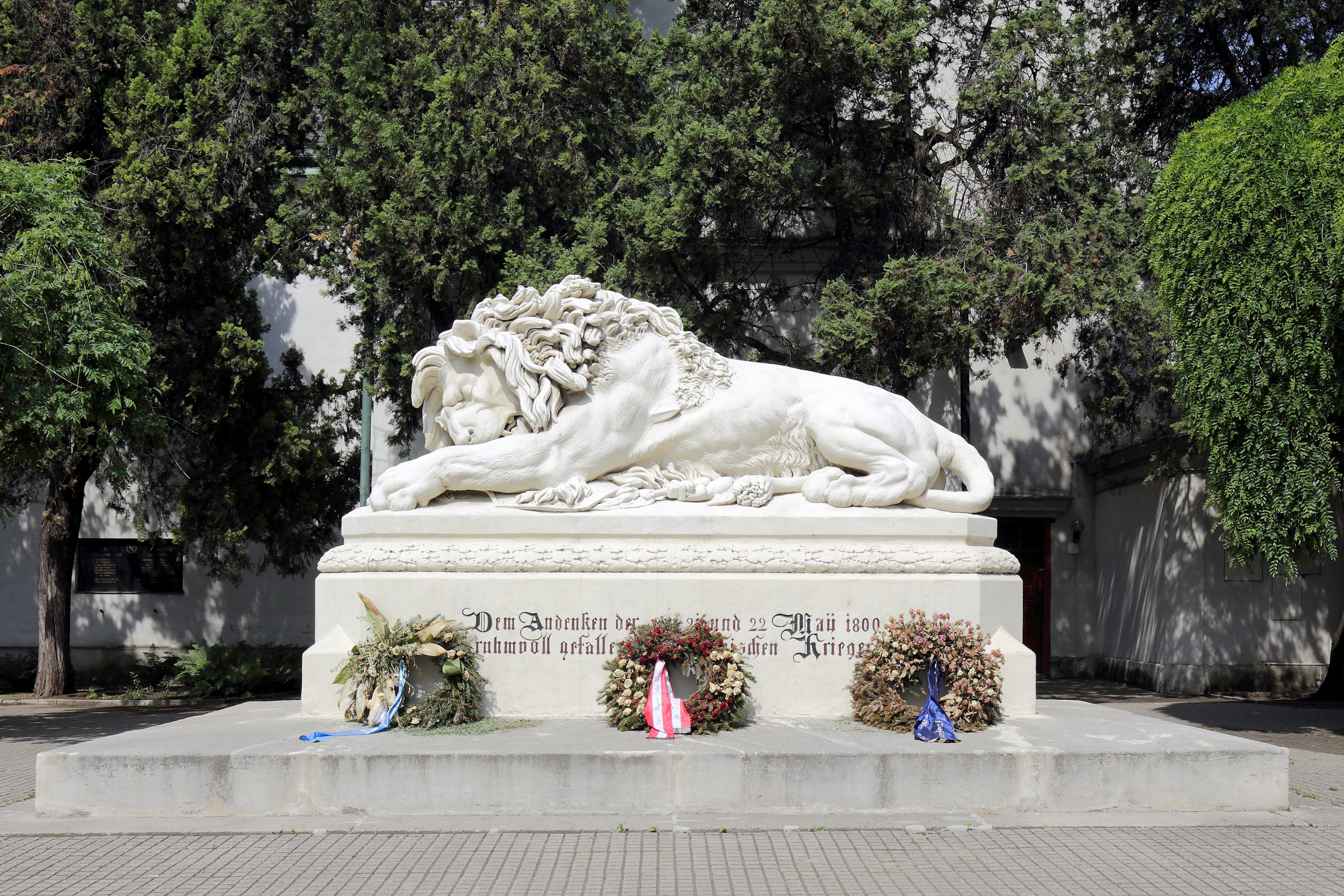
The "Lion of Aspern" is a monument to the fallen Austrian soldiers of the Napoleonic Wars.

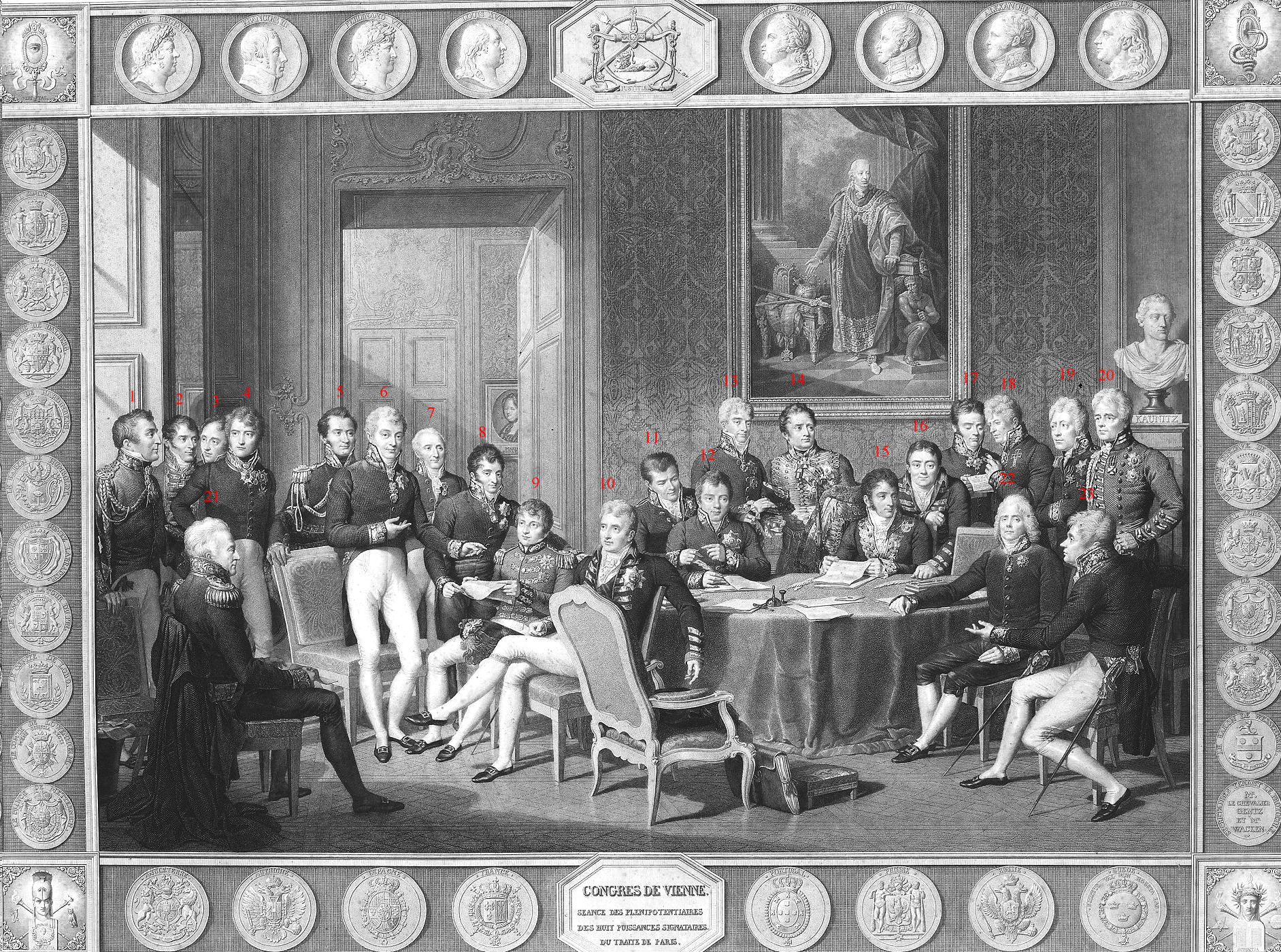
The Congress of Vienna restored peace in Europe after Napoleon

During the Napoleonic Wars, Vienna was taken by the French twice, in 1805 and 1809. The first conquest happened without a battle. Three French marshals crossed the strongly defended Taborbrücke (Tábor bridge), the only Danube bridge at that time, and convinced the Austrian commander that the war was already over. In the meantime, the French army easily entered the city and was greeted by the population with interest rather than rejection. Napoleon allowed 10,000 men of the Vienna national guard to remain armed and left the arsenal to them when he left, as complete as he had found it.

However, the second occupation happened only after heavy fire. Shortly after, Napoleon suffered his first large defeat at Aspern, nearby. Less than two months later, his army crossed the Danube again and fought the Battle of Wagram on the same terrain as the previous Battle of Aspern. This second battle resulted in a victory for the French, and Austria soon surrendered, ending the War of the Fifth Coalition. In 1810, Salomon Mayer Rothschild arrived in Vienna from Frankfurt and sets up a bank named "Mayer von Rothschild und Söhne". The Emperor of Austria in 1823, made the five Rothschild brothers barons. The Rothschild family became famous as bankers in the major countries of Europe, and the Rothschild banking family of Austria remained prominent until the Creditanstalt bank in Vienna was confiscated by the Nazis in 1938.

After Napoleon's final defeat, the Congress of Vienna took place from September 18, 1814 to June 9, 1815, in which the political map of Europe was redrawn. The congress members indulged in many social events, which induced the witty Charles Joseph, Prince de Ligne to famously say: Le congres danse beaucoup, mais il ne marche pas ("The congress dances, but does not progress"). The events cost Austria a great deal of money, which was reflected in mockery about the major participants:

Alexander of Russia: loves for all
Frederick William of Prussia: thinks for all
Frederick of Denmark: speaks for all
Maximilian of Bavaria: drinks for all
Frederick of Württemberg: eats for all
Emperor Francis of Austria: pays for all

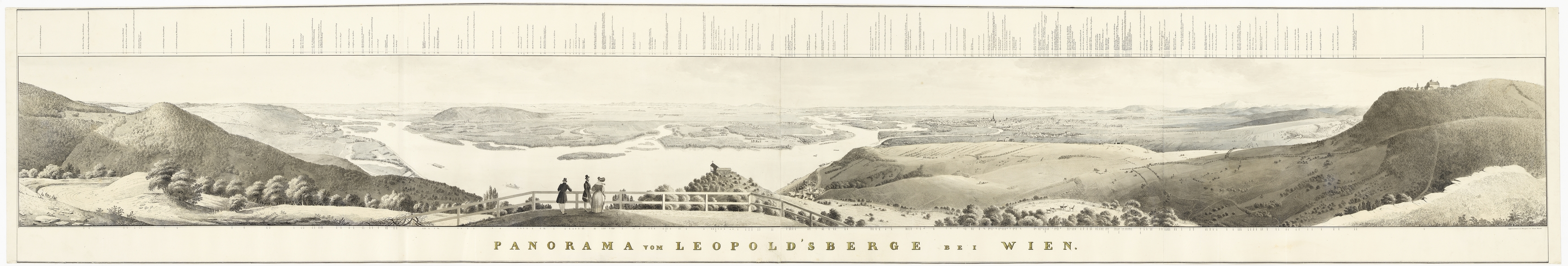
Panorama from Leopoldsberge with topographic indications (around 1830)

The first half of the century was characterised by intensive industrialization, with Vienna being the center of the railway network after 1837.

The French February Revolution of 1848 had an effect as far away as Vienna: on March 13, the March Revolution, which forced long-serving chancellor Metternich to resign.

During the 19th century, Vienna, along with Budapest, became one of the main centers of the Aromanian diaspora. The Aromanian population of these cities stands out for one of the first ones to develop a strictly Aromanian identity.

=== Expansion under Emperor Franz Joseph I ===
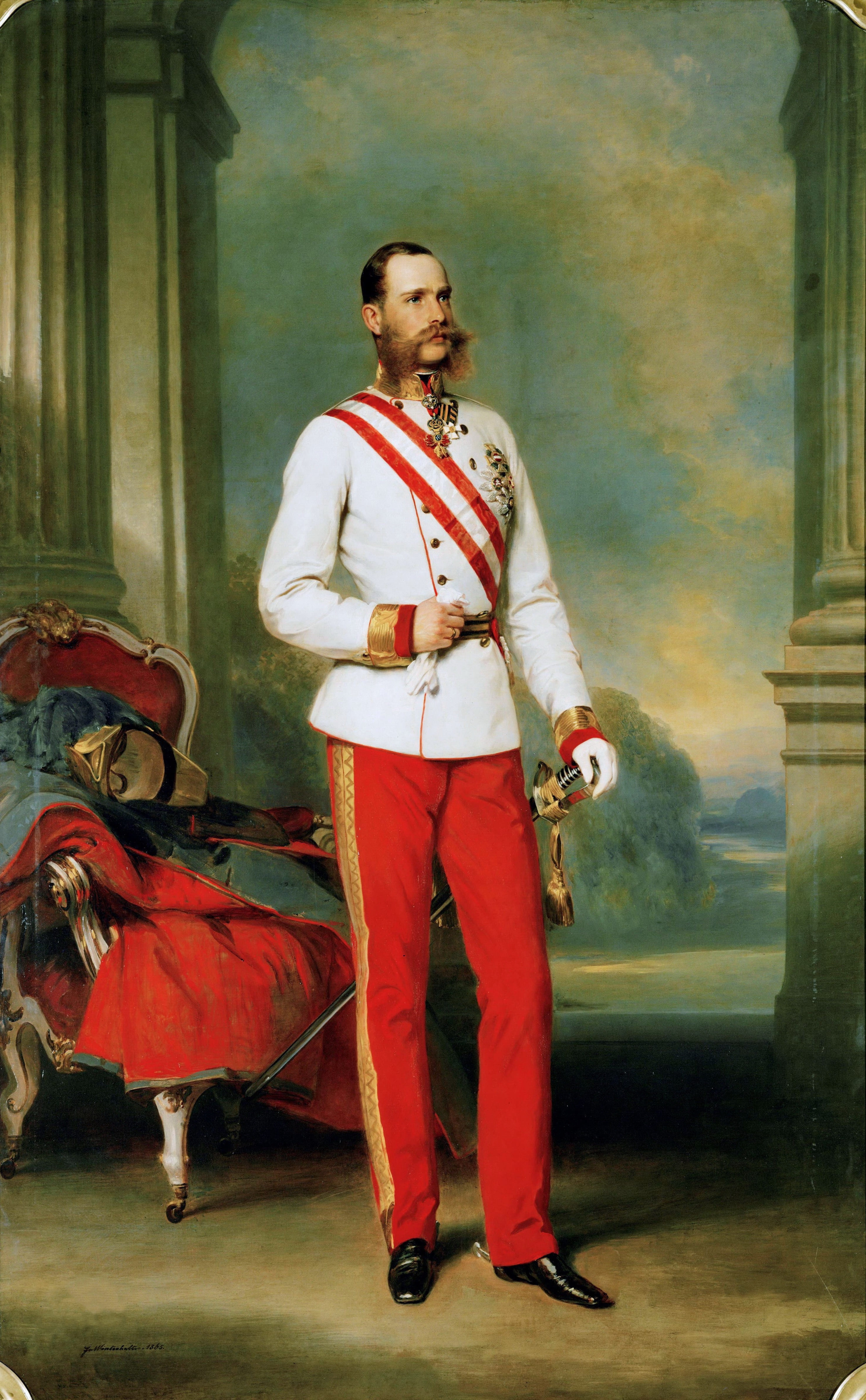
Portrait of Franz Joseph I by Franz Xaver Winterhalter, 1865. Under the rule of Emperor Franz Joseph I the city experienced rapid growth and an unprecedented flowering of culture, the arts and architecture.

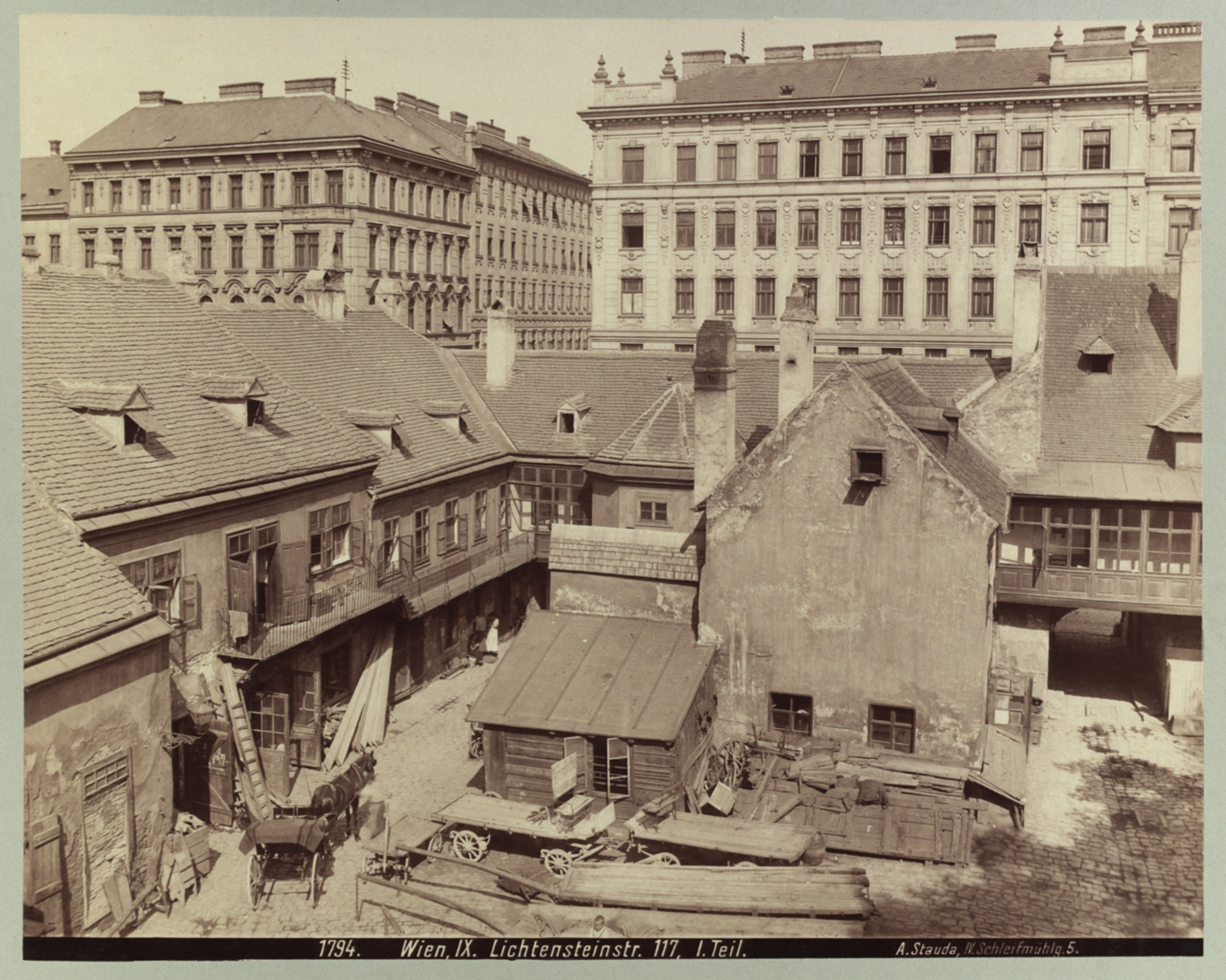
Old, small houses (in the foreground) that were destroyed and replaced during the big expansion under Emperor Franz Joseph

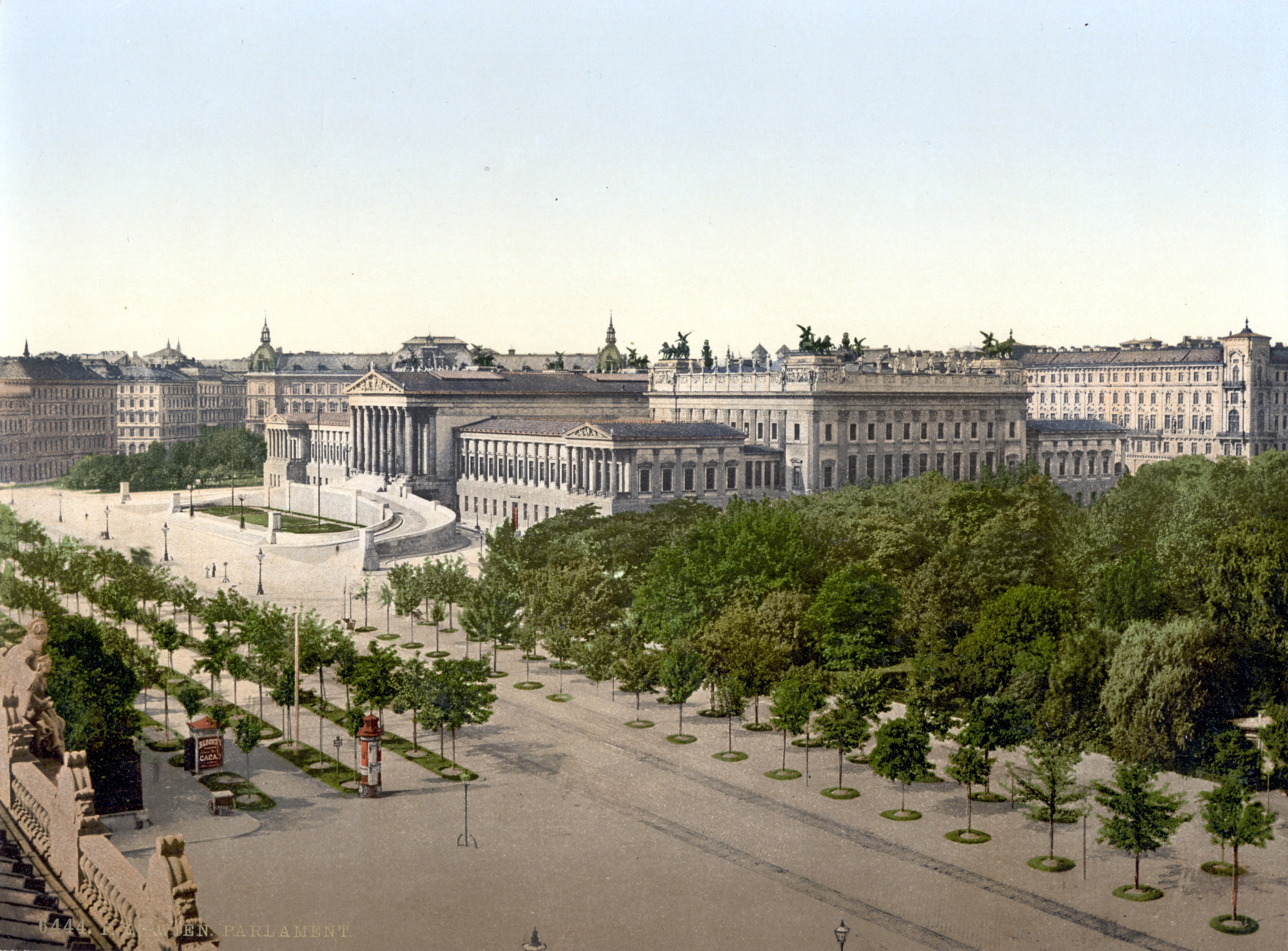
The newly completed Ringstraße with Parliament (1900)

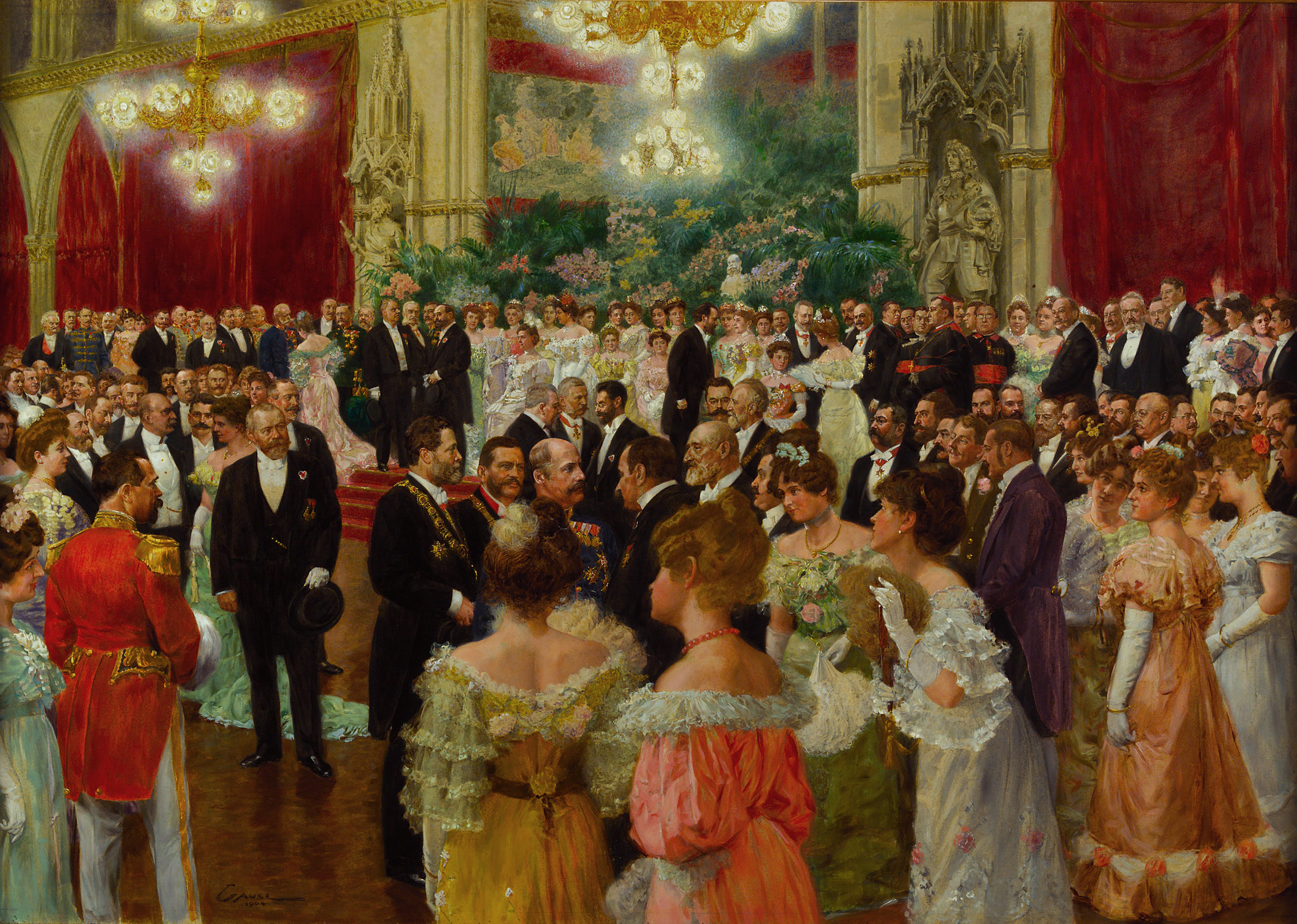
Ball at Vienna city hall with mayor Karl Lueger (1904)

The city was expanded in 1850, mostly to include the area within the Linienwall. The Vorstädte thus became the 2nd to 9th districts, with the old city becoming the first. In 1858, the fortifications were demolished, and the broad Ringstraße boulevard was built in their place. Many monumental buildings were built alongside it. The Ringstraße Style (Historicism) characterises the architecture of Vienna to this day. The period peaked in the World Exhibition of 1873, immediately before the stock market crash, which ended the Gründerzeit ("foundation era").

In 1861, the Liberals won the first (relatively) free elections after the end of neoabsolutism.

After the great flood of 1830, Regulation of the Danube was frequently considered. It was finally put into practice during the 1860s. The many branches of the Danube were removed, and a straight course was created away from the city centre. The branch near the central city was made narrower and has been known under the somewhat misleading name Donaukanal (Danube Canal) ever since.

During that period, the population of Vienna increased sharply, mostly because of migration. Censuses were conducted regularly from 1869 onwards, which showed an all-time high of population in 1910, with 2,031,000 inhabitants.

Around 1900, Vienna became a centre of the Jugendstil (Art Nouveau), most of all with Otto Wagner and the association of artists known as Vienna Secession (after which the characteristic building on Karlsplatz is named).

In 1890, the city was expanded for a second time: the (Vororte) suburbs beyond the old Linienwall were incorporated into the town as the districts 11 to 19 (the 10th district had been created in 1874 by the division of the fourth). Leopoldstadt was divided in 1900, with the northern part becoming the 20th district (Brigittenau). In 1904, Floridsdorf became part of Vienna as 21st district.

During those years, Karl Lueger was the leading figure of city politics. His dedication to social policy cannot be denied, nor other works for the municipality (such as the Wiener Hochquellwasserleitung, bringing fresh water from the mountains to Vienna and the creation of a belt of meadows and forests around the city). However, these positive aspects were coupled with his intense anti-Semitism, which enjoyed popular support at the time.

=== World War I ===
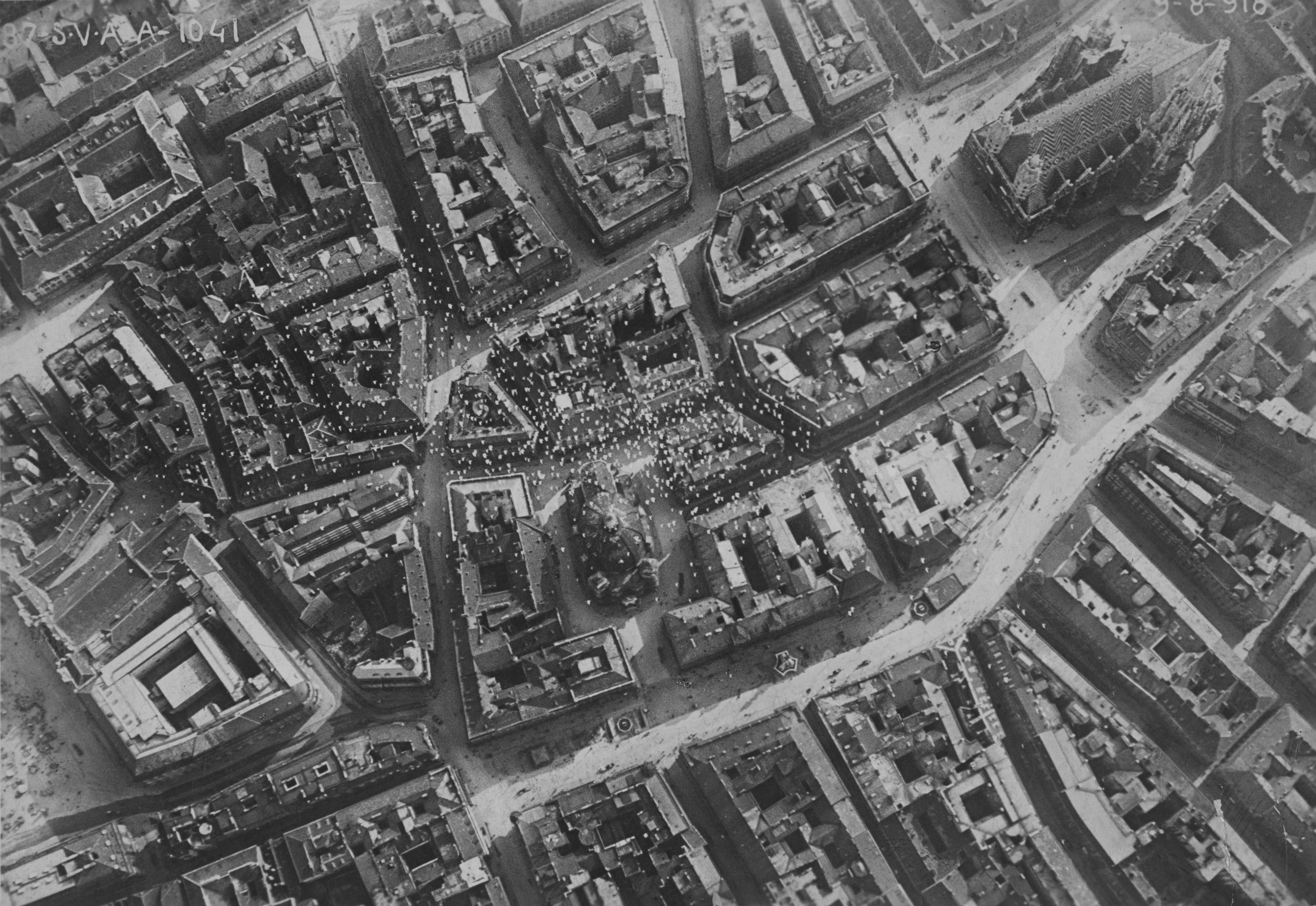
Italian leaflets dropped on Vienna in 1918

World War I (1914–1918) did not result in an immediate threat to Vienna, but it led to a lack of supplies because of the economic embargo imposed by the Entente powers, which resulted in a shortage of food and clothes. The skyrocketing costs of the war, mostly financed by borrowing, resulted in tremendous inflation that—as in Germany—wiped out the savings of many middle-class Viennese. One interesting quirk is that the 1916 Rent Control was never officially repealed; even today there are buildings where the 1916 rent—by now essentially meaningless—applies.

These food shortages led to the 1918 Austro-Hungarian January Strike which started in Vienna. The Bolshevik seizure of power in Russia in November 1917 inspired the youth wing of the Social Democratic Workers' Party of Austria to organise meetings in November 1917 opposing the war.

The Flight over Vienna propaganda flight, an air raid inspired by Gabriele d'Annunzio, was carried out on August 9, 1918, with 11 Ansaldo SVA. He flew undisturbed for over 1,200 km in a roundtrip to Vienna to drop about 400,000 propaganda leaflets, written in Italian and German, asking the people of Vienna the end of the alliance between Austria-Hungary and Germany.

== The First Republic ==
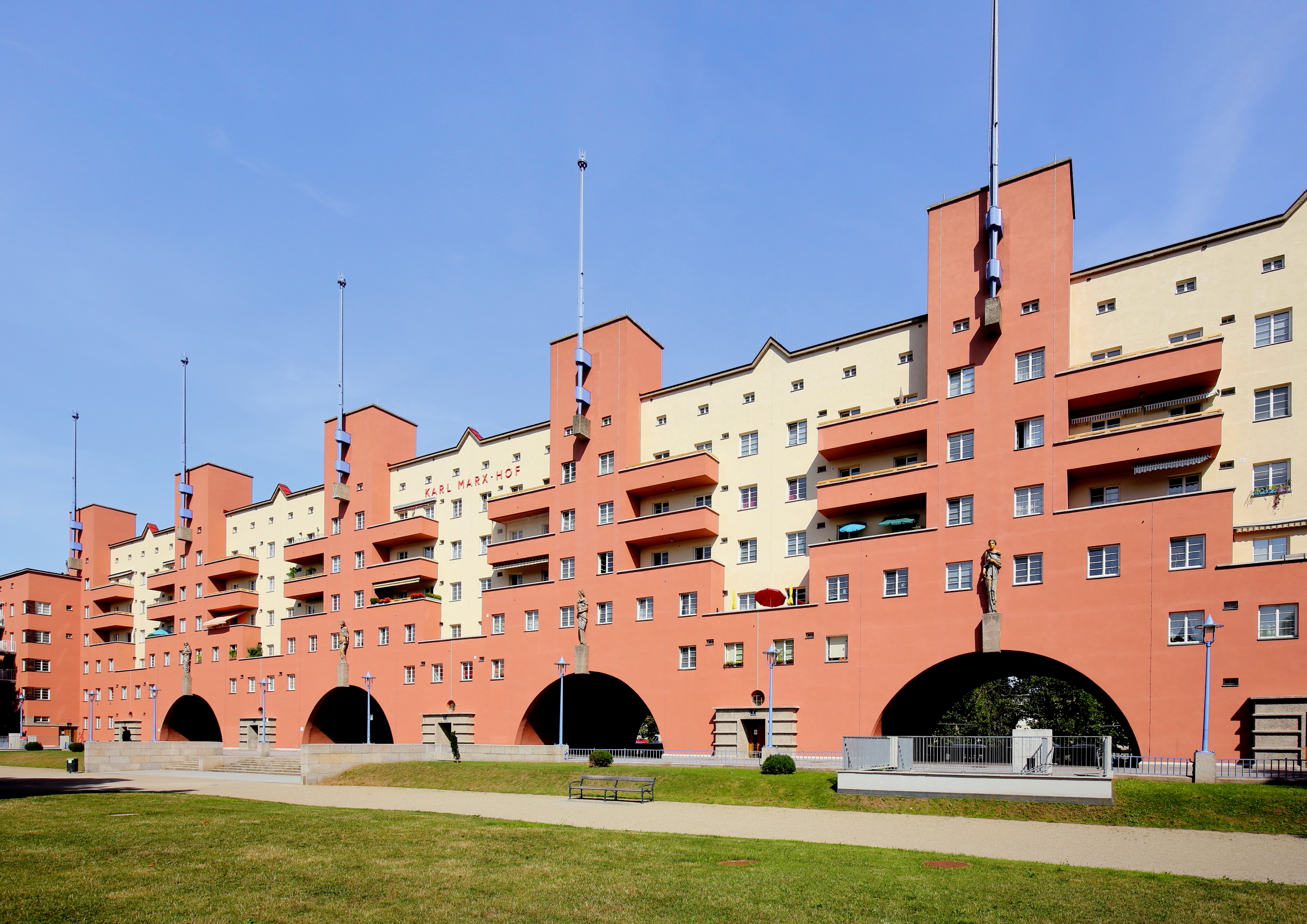
Karl-Marx-Hof is one of the best-known municipal tenement complexes of the 1920s.

The end of the war was also the end of Austria-Hungary. On November 12, 1918, the Republic of Deutsch-Österreich, or German-Austria, was proclaimed in front of the parliament. The population was concentrated in the capital, which was often called a hydrocephalus because of this; articles in the international press had doubts about the viability of Vienna as a major European metropolis after the dissolution of Austria-Hungary.

In 1921, Vienna was separated from surrounding Lower Austria and became a state of its own, with the mayor now equivalent in rank to a state governor. However, it remained the nominal capital of Lower Austria until 1986. The left-wing Social Democratic Party of Austria, who had dominated since the end of the war, were now in charge of the city administration. "Red Vienna" was considered an international model. Many notable Gemeindebauten (low-cost residential estates) were built during that period.

However, the increasing economic difficulties resulted in a political radicalization and polarisation of the political parties. On the social democratic side, the left-wing Republikanische Schutzbund (Republican Protective Alliance) was formed in 1923/24, which was a well-organised and well-equipped paramilitary group. It was opposed by the right-wing Heimwehr ("Home Guard"), which had been formed after the end of the war from local guards and similar combat units.

In May 1923, in the presence of President Michael Hainisch, the First World Congress of Jewish Women was inaugurated at the Hofburg.

== Austrofascism ==
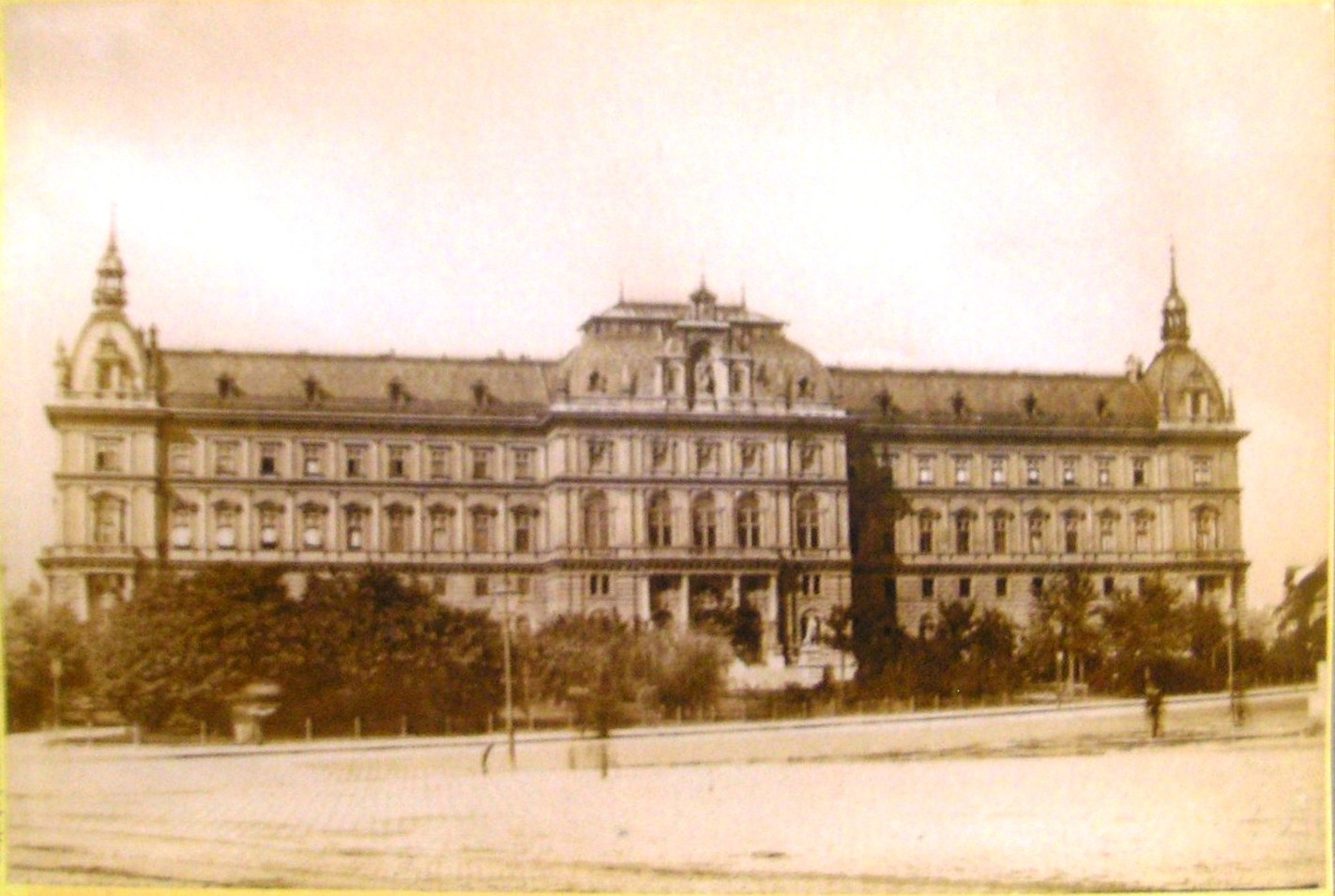
The Justizpalast fire (here an image from 1881 prior to the fire) led to the end of the First Republic.

The fire of the Justizpalast (Palace of Justice) in 1927 after violent demonstrations, the collapse of the Creditanstalt, the largest bank of the country, and finally the dissolution of parliament in 1933, marked the way to the Austrian Civil War in February 1934. After Engelbert Dollfuß, who had been Chancellor of Austria and foreign minister since 1932, had forbidden the Nazi Party, the Communist Party of Austria and the Republikanischer Schutzbund in 1933, he extended the ban to the Social Democratic Party in 1934 after the February Uprising. The only legal political organization was the new movement of his own creation, the Fatherland Front. Dollfuß created an authoritarian regime called Ständestaat and ruled without parliamentary approval.

== Annexation by Nazi Germany and Second World War ==
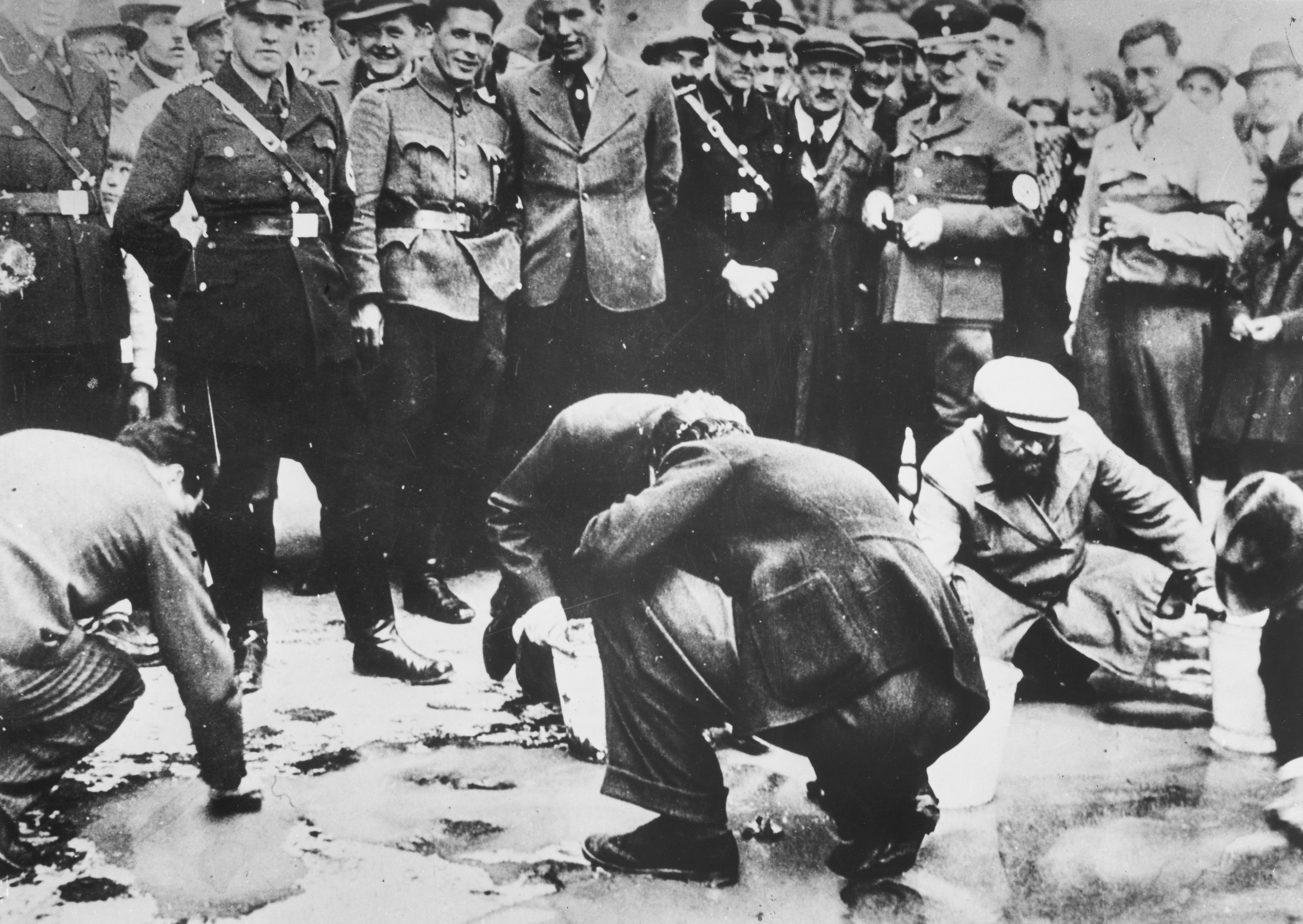
After the annexation by Germany, many Viennese Jews were forced to clean the sidewalks by the Nazis, with the support of many Viennese

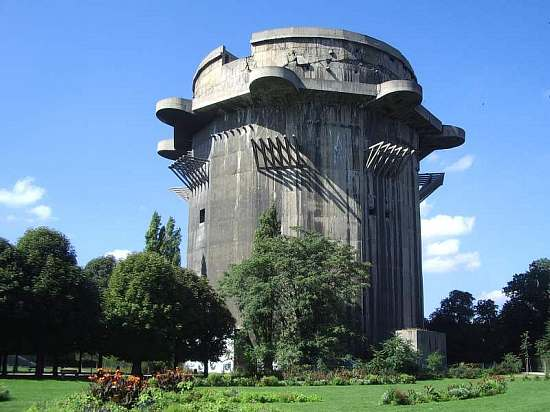
The flak tower in the Augarten belonged to the aerial defense system during Nazi rule

In March 1938, Nazi Germany occupied and annexed Austria in a process known as the Anschluss. Adolf Hitler was rapturously received in Vienna by large crowds of admirers and famously gave a speech at Heldenplatz in which he welcomed his homeland into the Reich. Hitler's anti-Jewish policies fell on fertile soil in Vienna, where latent anti-Semitism had increased during the early 20th century. Immediately after the Anschluss the Jews of Vienna were subject to violence from the State as well as from Antisemites acting out of their own sadism. During the Reichskristallnacht on November 9, 1938, the synagogues, the Jewish centres of not only religious, but also social life, were destroyed. In August, the KZ Oberlanzendorf Wien (Central Office for Jewish Emigration) was created. Its head was Adolf Eichmann. On the whole, and despite some instances of anti-Semitism, the city of Vienna was less supportive of the Nazi regime than was the rest of Austria. This however did not reach any extent of an organised resistance. Hitler himself hated Vienna and was determined to build up Linz, his childhood hometown, and relegate Vienna to backwater status.

In the course of the expansion of the city in 1938, 91 adjoining municipalities were incorporated into the city, from which the 22nd (Groß-Enzersdorf), the 23rd (Schwechat), the 24th (Mödling), the 25th (Liesing) and the 26th (Klosterneuburg) districts were created. With an area of 1,224 km^{2}, this made Vienna the city with the largest territory in the Third Reich.

=== World War II ===
During the war, the city housed 12 sub-camps of the infamous Mauthausen-Gusen concentration camp, located in various parts of the city.

Although originally out of range of Allied bombers operating from England, by 1943 the city began being attacked by bombers based in Italy. As in other major cities of Nazi Germany, large flak towers were constructed in Vienna as defensive structures against these bombers. These structures remain in place today, as they are so thick and their foundations so deep that to destroy them would damage surrounding buildings.

The U.S. bombings of 1944 and 1945 and the vicious fighting during the subsequent conquest of Vienna by Soviet troops in April 1945 caused much destruction within the city. However, some historic buildings survived the bombardment; many more were reconstructed after the war.

== The Second Republic ==
=== Allied occupation ===
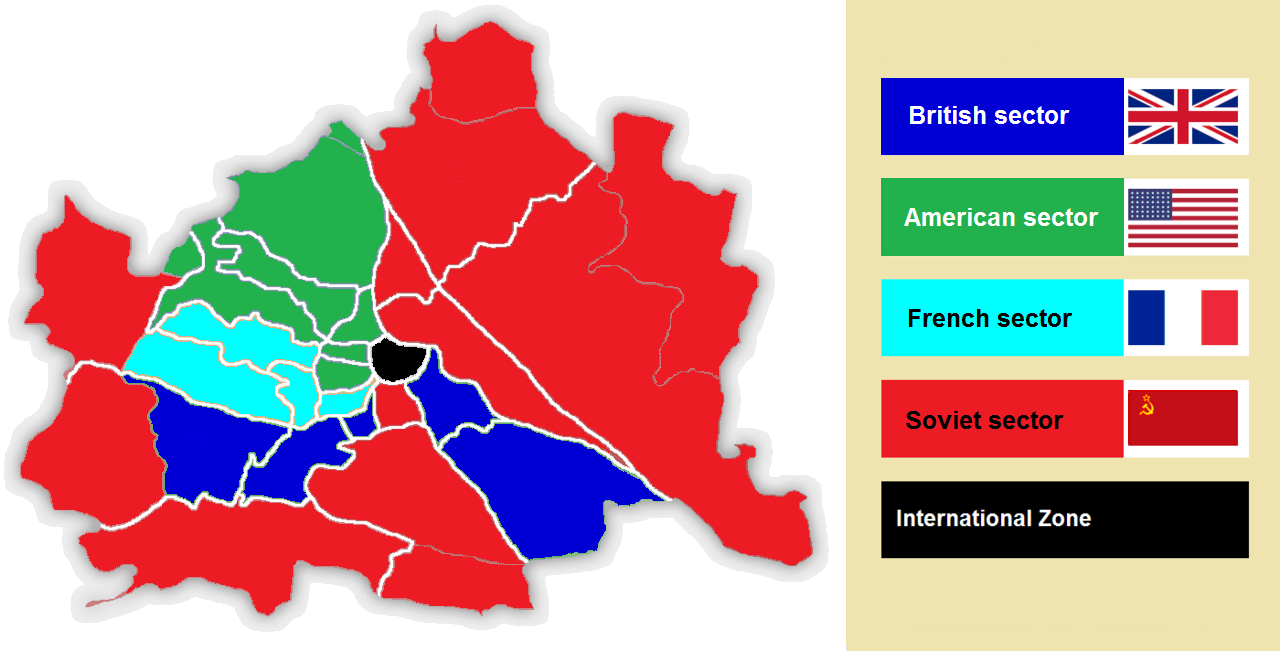
Zones of Allied occupation in Vienna

Only a few days after the war, a provisional city government and administration was created. Also, the political parties were recreated. On April 29, 1945, the parliament building passed from the occupation force to the new Austrian government, and Karl Renner announced the reinstitution of the democratic Republic of Austria. Vienna was divided into five occupation zones between the Soviet Union, the United States, the UK, France, and with the first district (city centre) being patrolled by all four.

The first municipal elections were held in November 1945. Of the 100 seats in the municipal council, the left-wing Social Democratic Party captured 58, the right-wing Austrian People's Party 36, and the Communists 6. In 1946, it was decided that the expansion of city territory of 1938 should be reversed, but this law was delayed by a veto of the occupying powers and was not put into practice until 1954. Two districts remained with Vienna, namely the 22nd one (Donaustadt) north of the Danube and the 23rd one (Liesing) in the south (some other districts gained some Lower Austrian territory).

=== Modern history since independence (1955) ===
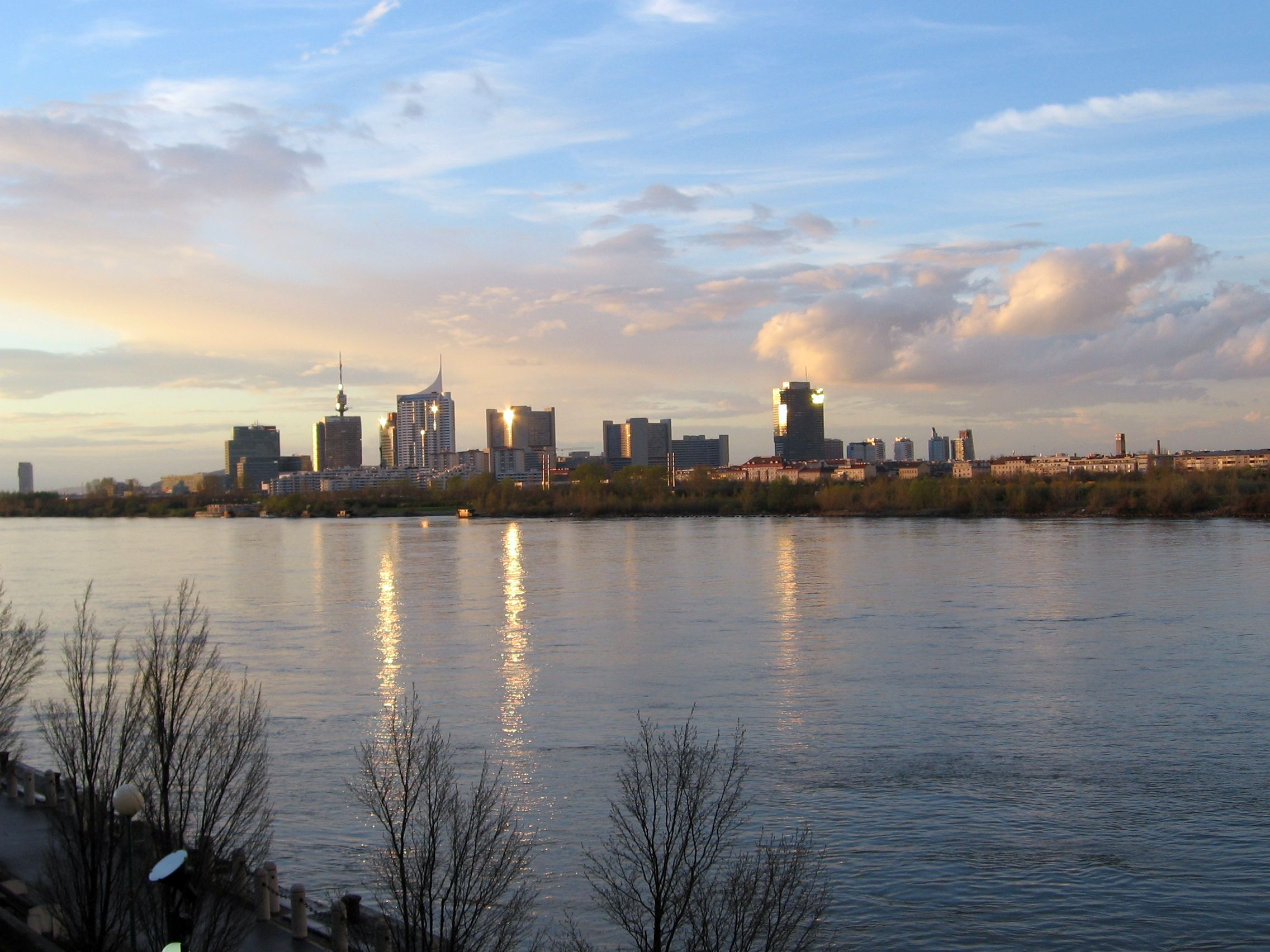
Vienna International Centre houses UN agencies, making Vienna after New York and Geneva the third most important seat.

On May 15, 1955, the country regained its political independence and sovereignty with the "Austrian State Treaty". The Austrian Parliament immediately amended the treaty to establish Austria's future neutrality and non-alignment (similar to that of Switzerland). This peace treaty was called a state treaty because Austria had temporarily ceased to exist in 1938.

After the war, as everywhere in Western Europe, there was an enormous economic boom, among other things because of the economic aid resulting from the Marshall Plan.

Public transport was improved by the introduction of the new Vienna U-Bahn network, the first part of which was opened in 1978. In 1979, the second Strategic Arms Limitation Talks treaty was signed in Vienna. During the 1970s, Vienna became the third official seat of the United Nations, and the UNO-City was built. At the end of the 20th century, a skyline consisting of several skyscrapers was created with, among others, the Andromeda Tower and Millennium Tower on the left and right sides of the Danube. Furthermore, a complex of skyscrapers was planned at the site of the Wien Mitte railway station, which might have endangered the position of Vienna's centre as a UNESCO World Heritage Site. The project has since been redesigned.

Vienna was the capital of the surrounding state of Lower Austria (German: Niederösterreich) until 1986, when it was replaced by Sankt Pölten. As Vienna was not a geographical part of Lower Austria it was a capital outside of the territory it served.

In the municipal elections of 2001, the Social Democrats regained an absolute majority.

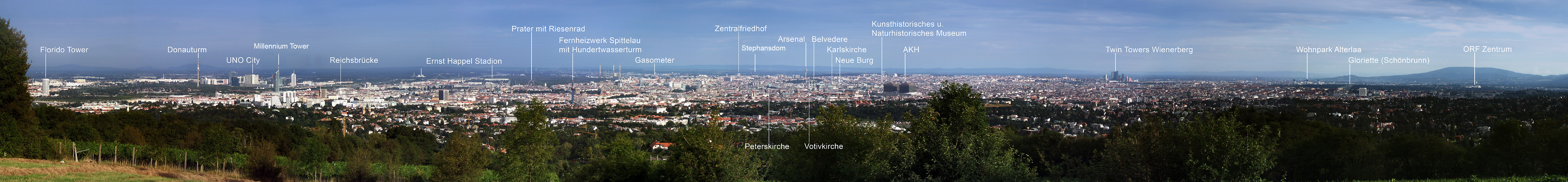
Panoramic view of Vienna towards the east, seen from "Himmel" (Heaven)

Espionage in Austria is legal if the country itself is not the target. The city has about 17,000 diplomats, many assigned to international organizations. Because of their presence and Austria's neutrality, Vienna became an important center for espionage, as depicted in The Third Man; during the Cold War the city allegedly had more spies than Austrian soldiers. Despite the 2022 Russian invasion of Ukraine, as of July 2023 there are more than 180 accredited Russian diplomats in Vienna, and reportedly more than one third are spies using diplomatic cover; Chinese, Iranian, Israeli, Saudi, American, British, and other European spies and counterspies are also in the country. Because of the tolerance of espionage the country is excluded from the Club de Berne.

== See also ==
- Timeline of Vienna
- History of Austria
- Districts of Vienna
