= Housing in Vienna =

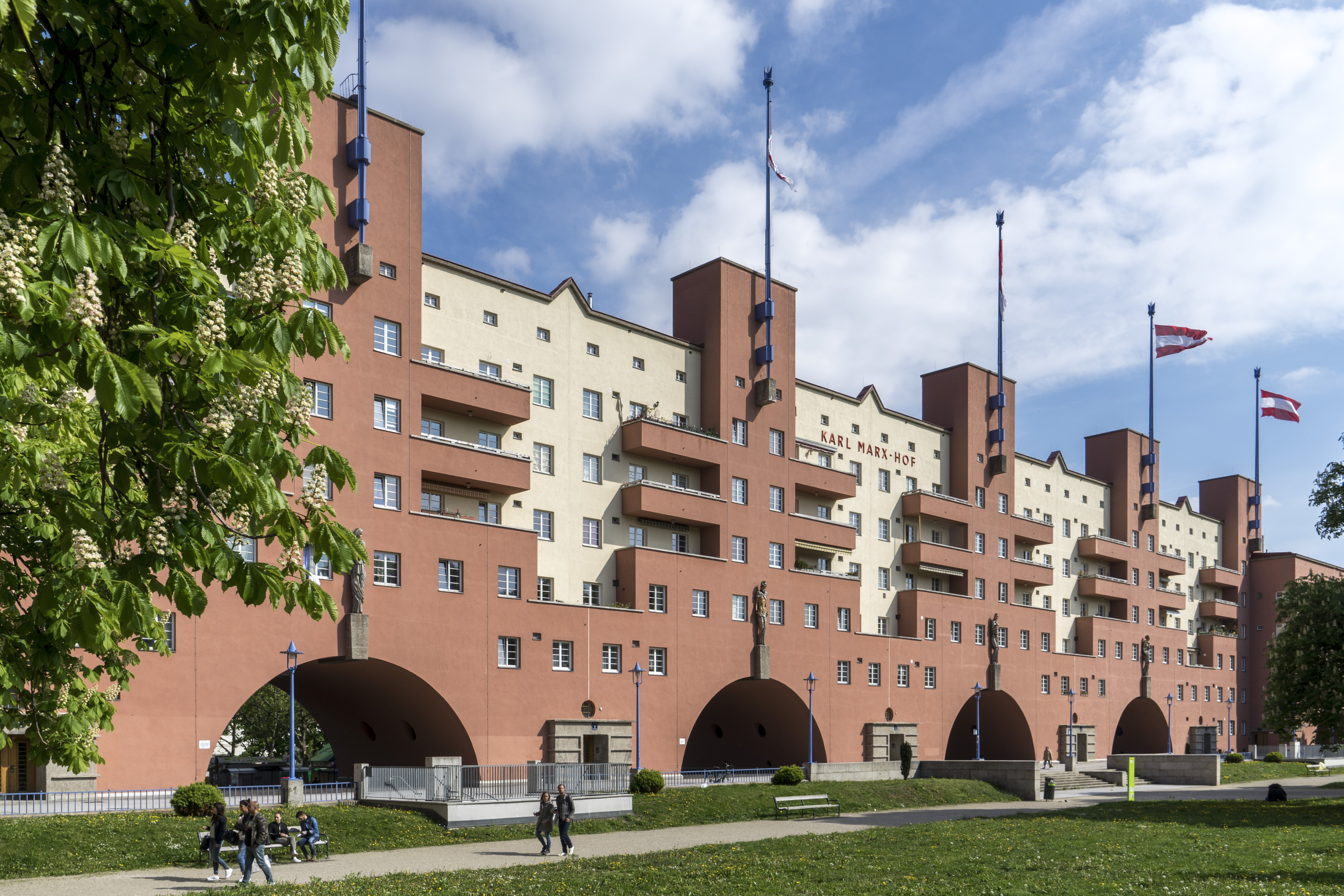
Karl-Marx-Hof, a famous Gemeindebau in Döbling, Vienna, constructed from 1927 to 1933 during the Red Vienna period

Vienna, the capital city and a federal state of Austria, has several types of housing arrangements.

The First World War exacerbated a pre-existing housing shortage within Vienna and contributed to a housing crisis. The Imperial government passed war-time measures such as rent controls and eviction regulations to protect tenants during the war. These temporary measures were maintained after the war, with the protections expanded and made permanent in 1922.

During the "Red Vienna" period from 1919 to 1934, the Social Democratic Workers' Party of Austria (SDAPÖ) controlled City Council and oversaw Vienna's ascension to the status of a federal state in 1922. With the city's newfound autonomy, the SDAPÖ undertook large construction efforts to provide mixed-income public housing provisions for the city.

Vienna today maintains some of the largest quantity of social housing and subsidised housing stock of any European city, in addition to having some of Europe's lowest median rents. A majority of Viennese residents reside in social housing, including city-owned housing, housing cooperatives, and nonprofit housing. Additionally, rent controls apply to 77% of private rentals.

== History ==
=== Early 19th century ===
Prior to the Bourgeois Revolutions of 1848, rental housing in Vienna was often tied to one's employment, meaning the loss of a job could result in the loss of one's dwelling. Through this period, housing construction was largely done at the discretion of the wealthy landowners that dominated Vienna. As landowners were expected to finance any new connecting roads and sewers, new housing was often built directly next to already developed areas owned by the given landlord. Housing on the land would then be sold as a leasehold, with owners of housing property being able to live in the dwelling or rent out the property, with the only obligation to the land holder through tax.

In 1819, the First Austrian Savings Bank was established, allowing for people to take out a mortgage instead of seeking loans from private investors.

=== Industrialisation and growth ===
The Bourgeois Revolutions of 1848 in the Austrian Empire had multiple direct effects on housing in Vienna. People were no longer heavily restricted from relocating across the empire and, as a result, Vienna saw an influx of Czech people and Galician Jewish people relocate into the city. Additionally, work contracts and tenants' rental situation became increasingly separated, with landlords and employers no longer being the same person. Another result of the revolution was the creation of the elected Municipal Council of Vienna as the governing body of the city. Landowners lost control of urban planning, their obligation to provide infrastructure, and their right to levy taxes. Responsibility for urban planning and infrastructure fell instead to the city council. The city council was first controlled by the Liberal Party, with the council disproportionately dominated by landlords. Although partially weakened, the strong positions of landlords in Vienna meant that tenants continued to have few protections, and tenants' concerns remained largely disregarded.

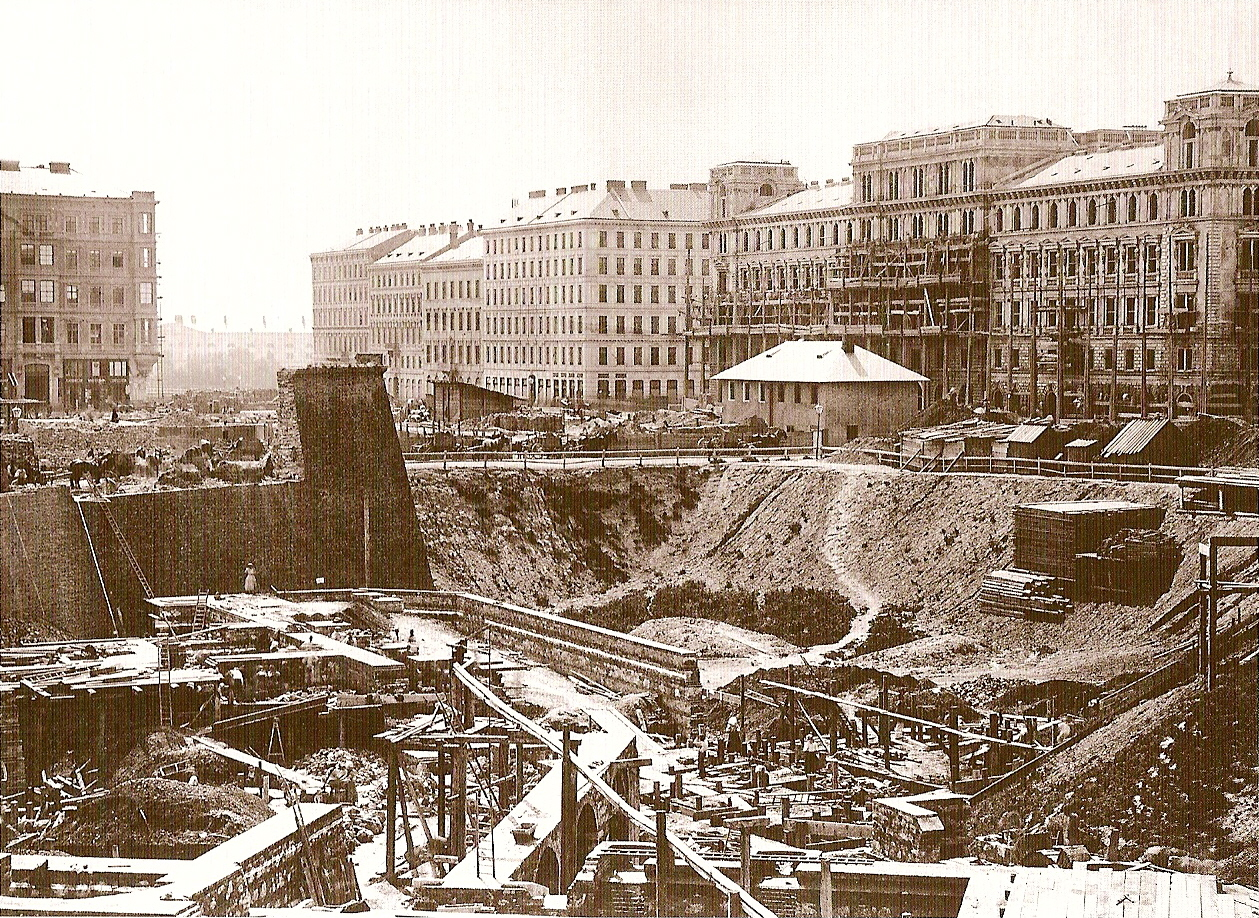
Construction of the Palais Schey von Koromla as part of the Vienna Ring Road

Vienna's growth mirrored the trajectory of many other European cities; industrialisation resulted in an increased population as peasant workers moved into the city. As Vienna's population increased, wages and employment decreased. Low wages and the city's housing shortage within the city resulted in the Viennese working class suffering increased housing insecurity. During a shortage of capital due to government bonds and the construction of Vienna's railways, most remaining funds were spent instead on the construction of the Vienna Ring Road and the new housing lining the street. The housing of the Vienna Ring Road was designed as upper-middle-class dwellings, making it inaccessible to the working class and failing to address the housing shortage.

The inner ring of suburbs surrounding Vienna were incorporated into the city in 1850. These suburbs became Districts 2–9 and 20 and comprise the Vorstädte of the city. The outer suburbs of the city—also known as the Vororte—were incorporated into the city in 1890. These suburbs became Districts 11–19. In districts 2–10, buildings up to five-stories tall were permitted. In the outer districts, buildings up to four-stories were permitted within densely populated areas, while less populated sections permitted up to three-stories. Within the Inner City of Vienna, buildings up to six-stories talls were permitted. Between 1870 and 1890, the outer districts of Vienna became urbanised, The economic boom between 1867 and 1873 speeding up urban development until a crash in 1973.

In 1895, the Liberal party lost control of Vienna to the newer Christian Social Party (CSP), which maintained the disproportionate position of landlords over the city council.

As of 1900, 25% of a working-class family's income was spent on rent, with lower-middle-class families spending around 23%, and upper-middle-class families spending between 16% to 20% on rent. That same year, nearly one-fifth of people in Vienna lived in overcrowded dwellings.

By 1910, at least 32% of people housed in Vienna were living in overcrowded dwellings, with approximately 20% of dwellings in Vienna being severely overcrowded. (Note: Overcrowding being defined as dwellings, which are only used as housing, in which there were more than two people for each room (including kitchens, bathrooms, and front halls)) As of 31 December, there were 93,000 sub-tenants and 75,400 lodgers in Vienna, exacerbating issues of overcrowding.

In 1911, in response to a rent hike of approximately 20% as food prices were increasing dramatically, a rent strike was organised. Much of this energy came to be funnelled into the new Mietervereinigung, a tenants' association with close ties to the SDAPÖ. Neither the rent strike nor the tenants association succeeded in forcing landlords to yield. In 1912, an estimated 550,000 people in Vienna had been in homeless temporary accommodation.

=== First World War housing crisis ===
The First World War exacerbated a long-standing housing shortage in Austro-Hungarian Empire as construction rates drastically slowed, causing a near-zero vacancy rate by 1918.

In 1917, only a net of 314 housing units were constructed in the city, (Note: 342 units were built and 28 units were razed) compared to 8,454 in 1911. (Note: 11,114 units were built and 2,660 units were razed) Additionally the number of housing units in Vienna were decreased due to conversion of dwellings into office space for business and war effort use. At the beginning of 1918, only 245 of Vienna's dwellings were vacant, decreasing to 105 by September 1919, most of them deemed unsuitable for habitation.

Prior to the war, there existed almost no protections for tenants, putting renters in a precarious position. In January 1917, legal tenant protections in the form of rent regulations and restrictions on evictions were enacted as wartime measures, intended to prevent the growth of revolutionary sentiment. Two following decrees expanded rent regulations, mandated registry of vacant dwellings, and prohibited conversion of dwellings for non-residential uses. These restrictions represented the first instance of tenant protections in Austria. Whilst these measures helped those who already held tenancy, this aggravated the crisis for those without.

With the end of the First World War, the housing crisis worsened further. Returning soldiers and refugees from the dissolution of the Empire resulted in Vienna swelling further. Famine was a significant problem for many people in Austria and the Siedler ("settler") squatting movement developed as these people tried to create shelter and a source of food for themselves. Squatting became common within the green belt around Vienna. Mass demonstrations took place by those struggling housing insecurity, and veterans' groups were prominent in public meetings.

=== Red Vienna period ===
Prior to the founding of the First Republic of Austria, the Social Democratic Workers' Party of Austria (SDAPÖ) had largely set aside the problem of the housing crisis, on the understanding that it that could only be solved long-term under socialism. Despite this, housing insecurity particularly affected the SDAPÖ's members and voter base, who were overwhelmingly working class renters. This groundswell obligated the SDAPÖ to adopt a proactive housing policy, in addition to already held policy positions such as rent control and property requisition. The Austromarxist tendency of the SDAPÖ came to understand tackling the housing crisis under capitalism as building toward a socialist society.

In 1919, the Viennese City Council was elected by universal suffrage for the first time, and resulted in the SPADÖ coming to power in the city for the first time. The SDAPÖ would be in power in Vienna uninterrupted for 15 years. That year, the city began a number of emergency measures to address the worst of the housing crisis. One such measure was the renovation of soldier barracks and arms storage space, and other military buildings for residential use.

The temporary war-time measures regarding rent control and restrictions on evictions were maintained throughout the post war. Permanent controls and regulations were enacted, by the Rent Restriction Act of 7 December 1922. Whilst rent controls were largely opposed by the Christian Social Party (CSP), some within the CSP were supportive, believing it aided Austrian businesses competing abroad by keeping nominal wages down, or by staving off revolutionary sentiment. The SPADÖ and supporters from the CSP prevented the removal of such tenant protections at the federal level. In addition to increased tenant protections, empty and underutilised dwellings became eligible for requisition by the city.

From 1919 to 1923, only 2,624 housing units were built, most of which being municipal housing owned by the city of Vienna itself. As with wartime construction efforts, this had only a minor impact on the availability of housing. On 1 January 1922, Vienna was separated from the state of Lower Austria and elevated to a state within Austria, allowing for newfound autonomy over its policy. Efforts from 1925 to 1934 were much more substantial, as 60,000 public housing units were made available in newly constructed municipal buildings. As opposed to borrowing money for the housing projects, mass construction was funded by the Vienna Luxury Tax and the Vienna Housing Tax, which were structured as progressive taxes. A tax on construction was also introduced.

Squatter settlements in the green belt around Vienna were given official recognition, in addition to being given resources, utilities, and transport services. Support was also given to housing cooperatives that had been established in the city.

The housing programs of this period were progressive in social policy, but noted for a more conservative architectural style. During the Red Vienna period, rent costs amounted to less than 5% of income for most workers. Approximately 200,000 people, one-tenth of the population of Vienna, were housed in dwellings constructed in this period.

=== Post-war era ===
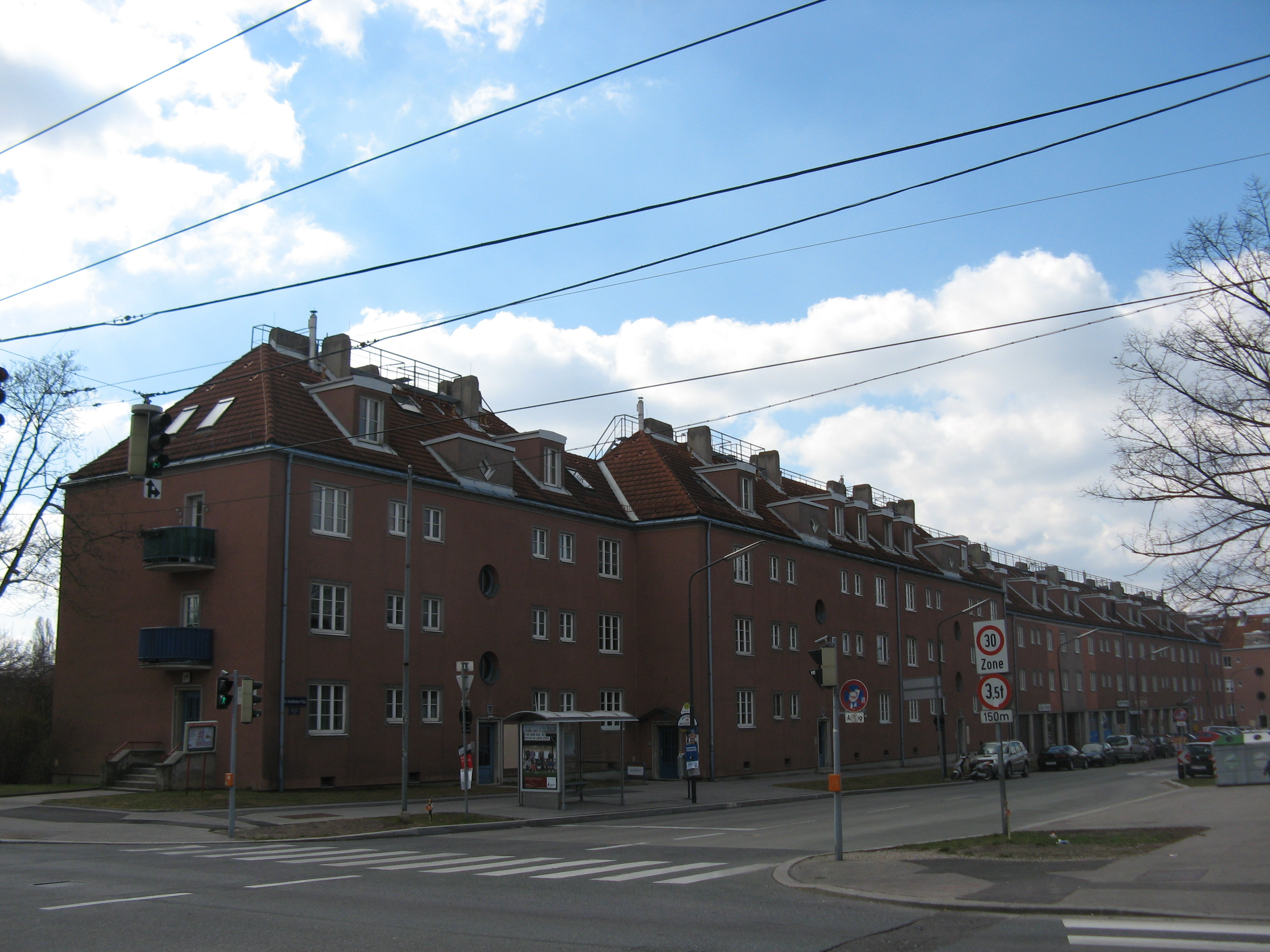
A Per-Albin-Hansson-Siedlung house built in the 1940s

After nearly a decade under fascist control, the Social Democratic Party of Austria (SPÖ)—the post-war re-establishment of the SDAPÖ—began the reconstruction of Vienna and its housing under the lines of the welfare state.

Per-Albin-Hansson-Siedlung, designed by Franz Schuster alongside Eugen Wörle, Friedrich Pangratz, and Stephan Simony, featured homes built with bricks made out of debris and cement by using so-called Vibro-block machines supplied by Sweden. The development was named after Per Albin Hansson, the Swedish Prime Minister who had been involved in Sweden's own Folkhemmet.

In 1984, the Vienna Land Procurement and Urban Renewal Fund was established to buy up land for the construction of social housing, as well as renovate and renew dwellings, particularly those within Inner Vienna.

In the mid-1990s, the private rent controls were weakened by deregulation on the federal level, which allowed landlords to increase rents on dewllings constructed in Vienna after 1944 based on aspects, such as location. The federal deregulations also made it easier for landlords to put limits on contracts after 1994. Dwellings in Vienna constructed before 1944 were unaffected by the change, retaining strong rent controls and tenant protections.

In 1995, Austria was admitted to the European Union. In 2004, construction of municipal housing was halted, with the SPÖ justifying the action in order to meet European Union regulations.

In 2015, Vienna resumed the construction of municipal housing.

== Present overview ==
=== Renting and homeownership ===
Vienna today has some of the most affordable housing and lowest rents in Europe. In 2023, rent for a two-bedroom was €542 a month.

Approximately 80% of Vienna either privately or socially rents, with 60% of Viennese residents residing in social housing, split nearly evenly between city-owned public housing and in limited-profit housing associations, (Note: sometimes referred to as "Gemeinnützige Bauvereinigungen" or "Genossenschaftswohnung" in German) such as housing cooperatives and strictly regulated private housing. 80% of residents in Vienna qualify for public housing, and rent controls apply to 77% of private rentals. Additionally, renters have strong just-cause eviction protections. Additionally, in Austria, dwellings built before 1944 that are privately rented are subject to stricter rent controls than dwellings built from 1945 onwards.

Vienna directly owns the most public housing stock of any city in Europe, at approximately 220,000 municipal units. A quarter of Vienna's population lives in public housing. According to Viennese law, rents in public housing can only be increased if a given years inflation exceeds 5 percent. City-owned public housing makes up around half of Vienna's social housing stock.

Another 200,000 dwellings are LPHAs, which may be formed as a private company or as a housing cooperative. LPHAs are federally regulated, and only allowed to charge cost-covering rents. LPHAs make up the remaining half of Vienna's social housing stock.

As of 2018, 19% of Viennese residents lived in a dwelling they owned.

Vienna housing shares (2020)
	Social housing		Private	Owner- occupied	Other	Total
	Municipal	LPHA	Private	Owner- occupied	Other	Total
Count	201,000	196,000	297,000	187,000	36,000	917,000
Pct.	21.9%	21.4%	32.4%	20.4%	3.9%	100%
Pct.	43.3%		32.4%	20.4%	3.9%	100%

=== Construction ===
Vienna's Land Procurement and Urban Renewal Fund currently holds a total of 3,000,000 square metres (32,000,000 square feet) reserved for new social housing construction. The fund is led by the City Councillor for Housing.

A new zoning rule was introduced in 2019 requiring that new developments with more than 5,000 square metres (54,000 square feet) of living space, or with more than 150 housing units, two-thirds must be subsidised housing.

=== Homelessness ===
The number of people making use of homeless services increased from 8,180 in 2010 to 12,590 in 2019, due to increased requirement and increased provisions meeting already existing needs.

== Vienna model of housing ==
Elsewhere, Vienna's housing approach over the years has been referred to as the Vienna model of housing, either in reference to the current housing approach, or the approach during the Red Vienna period.

== See also ==
- History of Austria
- July Revolt of 1927
- Greater Vienna
- Bed lodgers
- Plattenbau
- Red Vienna
- Housing First in Finland
- Public housing in Singapore
- Gemeindebau
