= Louise Yeung =

American urban planner, climate advisor, and civil servant

Chief Climate Officer of New York City
- Incumbent
- Assumed office January 1, 2026
- Mayor: Zohran Mamdani

Personal details
- Born: Chicago
- Party: Democratic
- Education: Massachusetts Institute of Technology (MS)

Louise Yeung is an American urban planner, climate advisor, and civil servant who is most known for her current role as the Chief Climate Officer of New York City during the mayorship of Zohran Mamdani, in which role she will be implementing his climate policy. She previously served as Chief Climate Officer at the Office of the New York City Comptroller from 2022 to 2026, and before that served in various other senior leadership positions in the City government.

== Biography ==
She was born and raised in Chicago. She received a Masters of City Planning from the Massachusetts Institute of Technology School of Architecture and Planning in 2013. She went on to work in various roles in city government, including as Energy Vice President at the New York City Economic Development Corporation, and later as Director of Resilience at the New York City Department of Transportation, where she worked from 2019 to 2022. During COVID, she also became the lead of the Food Supply Chain team. During that time, she praised collective action.

She became Chief Climate Officer to the New York City Comptroller, at that time Brad Lander, in 2022. In that role, she focused on issues including street reconstruction, climate justice, and economic support, including through a push to create new jobs in supporting the city's climate. She also focused on the implementation of Local Law 97, an emissions-capping law.

She joined the Zohran Mamdani mayoral campaign in September 2025 as a policy director. She then became the Chief Climate Officer of New York City upon Mamdani's inauguration in January. In her role as the Chief Climate Officer, she has been working on many of Mamdani's environmental priorities, including the "urban forest" idea of ensuring at least 30% tree cover across the city. She has also worked on environmental justice, emissions reductions, and cross-departmental collaboration.

She was included in City & State's Trailblazers in Clean Energy.

Outside of her professional life, she has worked on a concept called "romantic urbanism", focused on how cities can affect things like romance and platonic love, and helped to lead a speculative art project known as the Department of Tenderness based on that same concept.
