= Political positions of Zohran Mamdani =

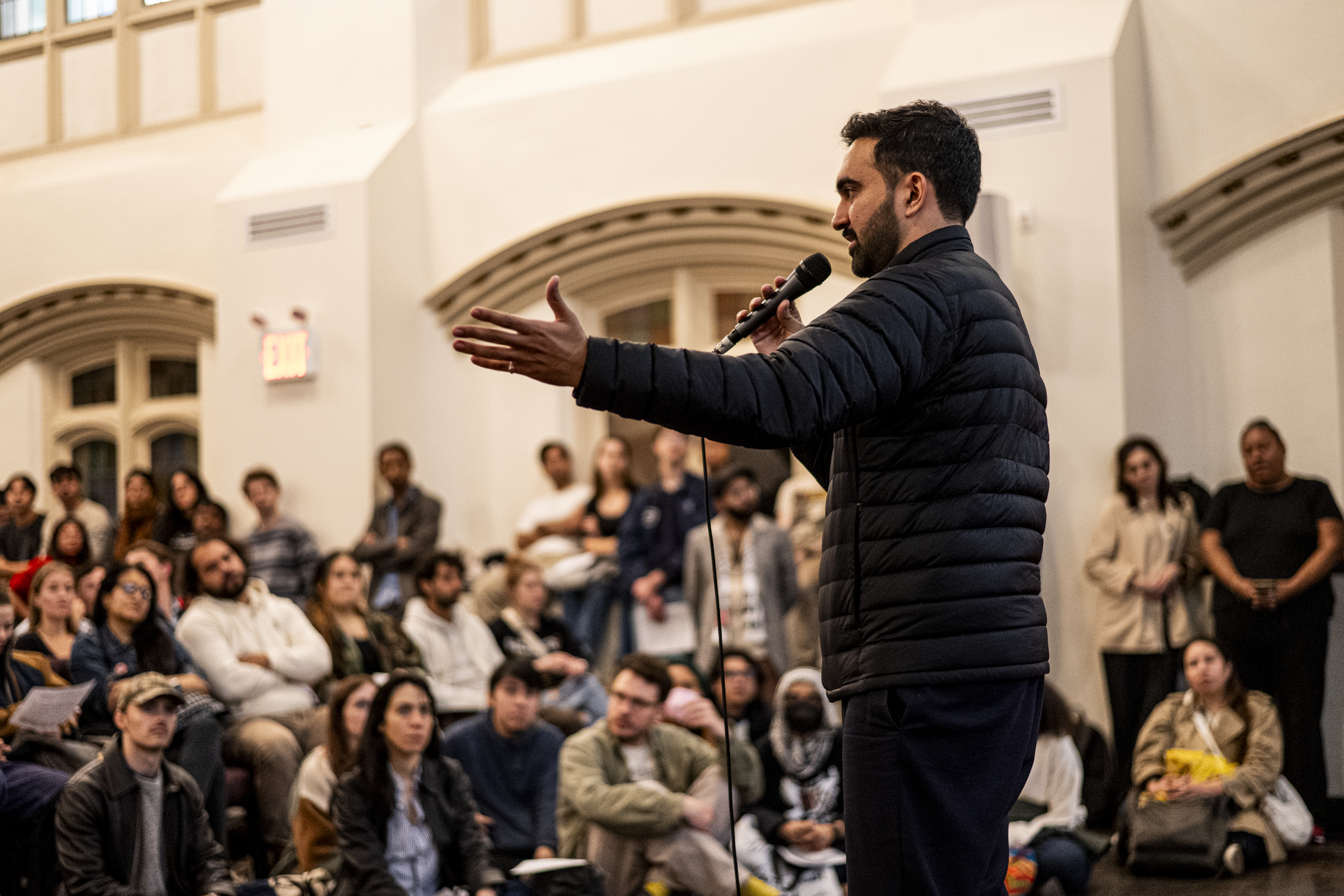
Zohran Mamdani speaking at a New York City Democratic Socialists of America event in the West Village, Manhattan

Zohran Mamdani, an American Democratic politician serving as the mayor of New York City, identifies as a democratic socialist. He is a member of the Democratic Socialists of America's New York City chapter. Mamdani has been described as a progressive by The New York Times and as a left-wing populist by The Guardian.

Influenced by his parents and early exposure to political discussion, he has credited Bernie Sanders's 2016 presidential campaign with shaping his democratic socialist outlook, and has cited 20th-century American "sewer socialists" as well as mayors such as Fiorello La Guardia, Michelle Wu, and Brandon Scott as models for governance.

His platform opposes wealth inequality, racism, and discrimination, while supporting LGBTQ+ rights, reproductive freedom, immigrant protections, and single-payer healthcare. It also advocates community-based public safety, universal childcare, fare-free public transit, large-scale social housing, stronger labor protections, higher taxes on corporations and high-income earners, and climate policies that link decarbonization with social equity.

== Influences ==
Mamdani has credited his parents for both fostering his interest in politics and world affairs and shaping his outlook on them. He has noted that, when he was growing up, his household frequently discussed these subjects. He has credited Bernie Sanders's 2016 presidential campaign for inspiring him to become a democratic socialist. Mamdani is also influenced by 20th-century American "sewer socialists" such as Milwaukee mayor Daniel Hoan and Congressman Victor L. Berger, as well as the populist New York City mayor Fiorello La Guardia. In a December 2020 tweet, Mamdani asked "So what kind of mayor does NYC need right now?" and cited Arya Rajendran, Mayor of Thiruvananthapuram and Communist Party of India (Marxist) member, as a positive model for a future mayor of New York.

During his mayoral campaign, Mamdani stated that his leadership would emulate Boston mayor Michelle Wu and Baltimore mayor Brandon Scott. He frequently pointed to Wu, whom he has called the most effective current Democratic politician in the U.S., as a role model for both her performance as mayor and prior work as a city councilor. Mamdani has specifically cited Wu's fare free-public bus transit pilot programs as inspiring his similar plans for New York City. Wu is a progressive but, unlike Mamdani, does not identify as a socialist.

On November 21, 2025, during a meeting with U.S. president Donald Trump, Mamdani said that Trump voters in New York City played a role in how he ran his campaign and that he met with people who voted for Trump, despite Mamdani's frequent criticism of the President.

== Social issues ==
Mamdani supported Proposal 1, a 2024 amendment to the Constitution of New York that made it unconstitutional to engage in discrimination based on ethnicity, national origin, age, disability, sex (including sexual orientation, gender identity, and gender expression), pregnancy and pregnancy-related outcomes, or reproductive healthcare and autonomy. Mamdani's mayoral campaign platform included opposition to wealth inequality and racism. He supports the New York Health Act, which would establish single-payer healthcare in New York State.

=== Childcare and education ===
Mamdani supports a universal pre-kindergarten childcare system. He has proposed giving all new New York City families "baby baskets" containing products such as diapers and nursing supplies. Mamdani introduced a bill to eliminate New York University's and Columbia University's state property tax exemption and direct those funds to the City University of New York system, which has historically struggled with funding.

In a June 2025 interview with Der Blatt, a newspaper associated with the Hasidic movement of Judaism, Mamdani expressed a desire to defend Hasidic yeshivas (institutions for Torah study) from accusations of failing to meet state educational standards. He said "I will listen to your leaders" on education and "I will work to protect you from anyone who wants to disturb your way of life".

=== Civil rights ===
Mamdani supported Proposal 1, a 2024 amendment to the Constitution of New York that made it unconstitutional to engage in discrimination based on ethnicity, national origin, age, disability, sex (including sexual orientation, gender identity, and gender expression), pregnancy and pregnancy-related outcomes, and reproductive healthcare and autonomy.

=== Crime and policing ===
Mamdani has argued that increasing policing and incarceration does little to prevent harm and that "dignified work, economic stability, and well-resourced neighborhoods" can more effectively keep the public safe. He has advocated a more community-based approach to reducing crime, focusing on homeless outreach and anti-violence programs. He contends that there is too much reliance on police to fix societal problems, saying, "Police have a critical role to play, but right now we are relying on them to deal with the failures of the social safety net of reliance that is preventing them from doing their actual jobs." He has proposed a Department of Community Safety to expand mental health outreach. This proposed civilian-led department would deploy mental health teams to respond to 911 calls and expand street-level programs intended to stop the cycle of violence, as well as focusing on programs "that are proven to create long-term stability and promote recovery."

In a June 2020 tweet, Mamdani voiced support for defunding the NYPD. During the 2025 mayoral race, he said he would work with the police rather than defund them, emphasizing their importance in dealing with violent crime and the role of social workers and mental health professionals in addressing underlying causes and prevention. In October 2025, Mamdani apologized for describing the NYPD as racist. He chose to retain Mayor Eric Adams's police commissioner, Jessica Tisch, who opposes bail reform and has collaborated with ICE, and whose "quality of life" teams are viewed by some as "stop-and-frisk 2.0". In September 2025, Mamdani condemned the assassination of Charlie Kirk, saying that political violence has no place in the United States.

=== Environment ===
Mamdani views climate action as essential to achieving social justice in New York City. In 2021, he organized volunteers and lobbied Governor Kathy Hochul to prevent the expansion of a gas-fired peaker power plant in Astoria, citing environmental concerns for low-income non-white communities. Mamdani has also backed statewide measures such as the All-Electric Buildings Act, which prohibits installing fossil-fuel equipment (e.g., gas stoves) in new buildings, and supported introducing congestion pricing in Manhattan to reduce traffic-related emissions. Mamdani was an advocate of the "Build Public Renewables Act", which has been described as a state-level Green New Deal.

As a mayoral candidate, Mamdani proposed a comprehensive decarbonization and resilience agenda. His "Green Schools for a Healthier New York City" blueprint would retrofit 500 public school buildings with rooftop solar arrays and upgraded HVAC systems; build 500 green schoolyards; transform heat-absorbing asphalt into green space serving students and community residents; convert 50 schools into year-round resilience hubs to offer shelter and resources during extreme heat, storms, or flooding; and extend tax incentives such as J-51 benefits to support building owners' compliance with Local Law 97.

=== Health care ===
Mamdani supports the New York Health Act, which would establish single-payer healthcare in New York State. He portrayed a firefighter in a 2021 advertisement for the Campaign for New York Health.

He criticized President Trump's One Big Beautiful Bill Act, saying Republicans were attempting one of the "biggest heists in U.S. history".

=== Immigration ===
Mamdani supports enforcement of New York's sanctuary laws, which bar Immigration and Customs Enforcement (ICE) from entering schools, hospitals, and city property without a judicial warrant, and has advocated for stronger sanctuary laws. Mamdani has decried the actions of ICE under the Trump administration as being fascist. He has also proposed creating a commission to ensure compliance by city agencies and contractors. He has pledged that if he is elected mayor, the city will provide legal representation for all immigrants in detention proceedings.

On March 12, 2025, Mamdani confronted former ICE acting director Tom Homan in Albany about ICE's recent arrest of student activist Mahmoud Khalil; Mamdani yelled, "Do you believe in the First Amendment?" Mamdani supports abolishing ICE, stating that the agency is "terrorizing people no matter their immigration status, no matter the facts of the law, and no matter the facts of the case".

=== LGBTQ+ rights ===
Mamdani staunchly supports LGBTQ+ rights. He aims to establish NYC as an LGBTQ+ sanctuary city and establish the Office of LGBTQIA+ Affairs to "expand and centralize the services, programs, and support that LGBTQIA+ New Yorkers need across housing, employment, and more." Mamdani says LGBTQ+ people who became homeless due to their identity would benefit from his cost-of-living policies.

Mamdani appeared at a February 2025 rally in Union Square to protest an executive order signed by President Donald Trump that threatened to "withhold federal funding from hospitals that provide gender-affirming treatments to trans youth". As part of his platform, he supports expanding and protecting gender-affirming care citywide. He proposed an immediate investment of $65 million in public providers to ensure funding for medical treatments that lose Medicaid coverage and promised to ensure hospital accountability.

On March 13, 2026, he created the New York City Office of LGBTQIA+ Affairs and appointed Taylor Brown as its first director.

=== Transportation ===
Mamdani supports permanently eliminating New York City bus fares. He advocated for a fare-free pilot program on MTA buses, which was launched on the Q4, B60, Bx18, M116 and S46/96 routes in September 2023. The program saw a 30% increase in ridership on weekdays, predominantly from people earning less than $28,000 a year. Across the five routes made free, assaults on bus operators dropped by 38.9%. The fare-free program ended in August 2024 after state lawmakers did not reauthorize it. In response, Mamdani said, "the MTA was opposed to this program ... because they were saying that now is not the time to create any kind of confusion around fare collection." He estimates that it would cost New York City $650 million per year to eliminate bus fares.

In December 2022, Mamdani introduced a series of bills for the 2023 session called "Fix the MTA". He proposed free bus travel over the next four years across the Bronx, Brooklyn, Queens, and then Manhattan and Staten Island. The Formula Three Act would fill the $2.5 billion shortfall of the MTA with another plank freezing fares at $2.75. Another plank would have set aside further money for more frequency, such as six-minute headways for trains and the 100 most-used bus routes, then using any additional funds to increase service by 20%.

In 2023, Mamdani co-introduced a bill to enact a weight-based vehicle-registration fee to dissuade people from owning heavier vehicles in an effort to make streets safer. Mamdani supports congestion pricing in New York City and drafted a bill with New York state senator Michael Gianaris titled "Get Congestion Pricing Right" to increase bus service frequency and increase the number of fare-free buses.

== Economic policy ==
=== Housing ===
Mamdani has advocated for rent control, strengthening tenant protections, and creating a Social Housing Development Agency that would build publicly owned affordable housing. He has stated that he takes inspiration from the Vienna, Austria, model of social housing. He wants to build 200,000 new units of affordable, rent-stabilized homes over the next 10 years with union labor, and double the amount of spending to rehabilitate homes for the city's 400,000 public housing tenants. Mamdani and his team have proposed city, private, or public takeover of housing units neglected by landlords. He also wants to "increase density around mass transit hubs" and "upzone wealthier neighborhoods", citing housing policies in Jersey City and Tokyo as examples.

During his campaign, Mamdani promised to end homeless encampment sweeps in the city, saying "If you are not connecting homeless New Yorkers to the housing that they so desperately need, then you cannot deem anything you're doing to be a success". Mamdani paused sweeps in January, but restarted them in February, with the Department of Homeless Services leading instead of the NYPD and a longer period of outreach to connect people with shelter.

=== Labor ===
Mamdani advocates for debt relief among taxi medallion owners. He supports expanding labor protections and relying on unionized labor for public projects.

Mamdani supports raising New York City's minimum wage to $30 per hour by 2030.

=== Social ownership ===
As a democratic socialist, Mamdani supports an expansion of social ownership in the form of public enterprises, worker-owned cooperatives, and community land trusts. In 2024, Mamdani was the primary sponsor of a bill that would add worker cooperatives to the list of preferred contractors for public contracts in New York State. At the same time, he supports lowering permit costs and extending public support for small businesses in the private sector.

Among his primary campaign positions are a pilot program in which the New York City government would operate one grocery store in each borough to drive down prices, and an extensive social housing system similar to the Vienna model. These policies have been described as "socialist-style regulation" of goods and services. Bhaskar Sunkara described Mamdani's policies as mostly social democratic reforms with some (like city grocery stores and social housing) that lean further toward socialist. Mamdani was a co-sponsor of the "New York Public Banking Act". During Mamdani's campaign for assembly, he ran on public ownership of utilities.

In April 2026, Mamdani updated his proposal for city owned and run grocery stores by saying that, "a private operator will run the store." In July 2026, Mamdani said that at the beginning of every month, the grocery stores would set the prices for fresh produce, meat, seafood, bread, milk, eggs, and other staples at a 30% discount, and that the prices would remain at that level for the entire month.

=== Taxes and inequality ===
Mamdani supports an increase in corporate taxes in New York State from 7.25% to 11.5%, to match those of New Jersey. He also supports a new 2% increase for income tax on city residents who earn more than $1 million a year, to raise $20 billion to fund tuition-free City University of New York (CUNY) and State University of New York (SUNY) schools, statewide universal childcare, a subway fare freeze, free MTA buses, and tenant protections. In June 2025, Mamdani said, "I don't think we should have billionaires."

Mamdani made a mayoral campaign pledge to reduce taxes on "overtaxed homeowners in the outer boroughs" of New York City, while advocating to increase taxes on "more expensive homes in richer and whiter neighborhoods." His intention with this policy was to tackle a 1981 property tax law that essentially taxes owners of expensive homes based on the homes' potential rental price rather than their market value, which could lead to the owners paying much less property tax than owners of cheap homes.

== Foreign policy ==
=== Venezuela and Cuba ===
Mamdani condemned both Venezuelan president Nicolás Maduro and Cuban president Miguel Diaz-Canel as dictators, but also said the United States' actions against Venezuela and Cuba, including an embargo against the latter, only worsened the conditions of Venezuelans and Cubans.

In January 2026, Mamdani condemned American strikes on Venezuela and the capture of Maduro by the Trump administration, calling it "an act of war and a violation of federal and international law" and "a clear attempt to change the regime." He also warned that the US effort to change the regime would affect not only the people of Venezuela, but also the residents of New York. Mamdani briefly called Trump to voice his opposition to the act.

=== India ===
Mamdani has said he would refuse to appear with Indian Prime Minister Narendra Modi if Modi visited New York, as he considers Modi a "war criminal", accusing him of "orchestrat[ing] a mass slaughter of Muslims in Gujarat" during the 2002 riots in which 790 Muslims and 254 Hindus died. The Supreme Court of India cleared PM Modi of complicity in the 2002 riots. He compared Modi to Israel's Netanyahu. Mamdani said that in the aftermath of these events, few Muslims remain in Gujarat, and that most people believe Gujarati Muslims do not exist today, a claim Indian leaders disputed.

=== Iran ===
Mamdani condemned U.S. airstrikes on Iranian nuclear sites during the Twelve-Day War, describing them as unconstitutional and destabilizing.

In January 2026, Mamdani criticized the Iranian regime's violence against anti-government protesters.

Mamdani has expressed concern over the financial and human toll of the 2026 Iran War, stating that excessive military spending detracts from funding necessary public services. He remarked, "We are addressing a conflict that has resulted in the deaths of thousands of innocent people. We are using billions of dollars to take lives. Funds that could help improve the standards of living for working individuals.".

=== Israel ===
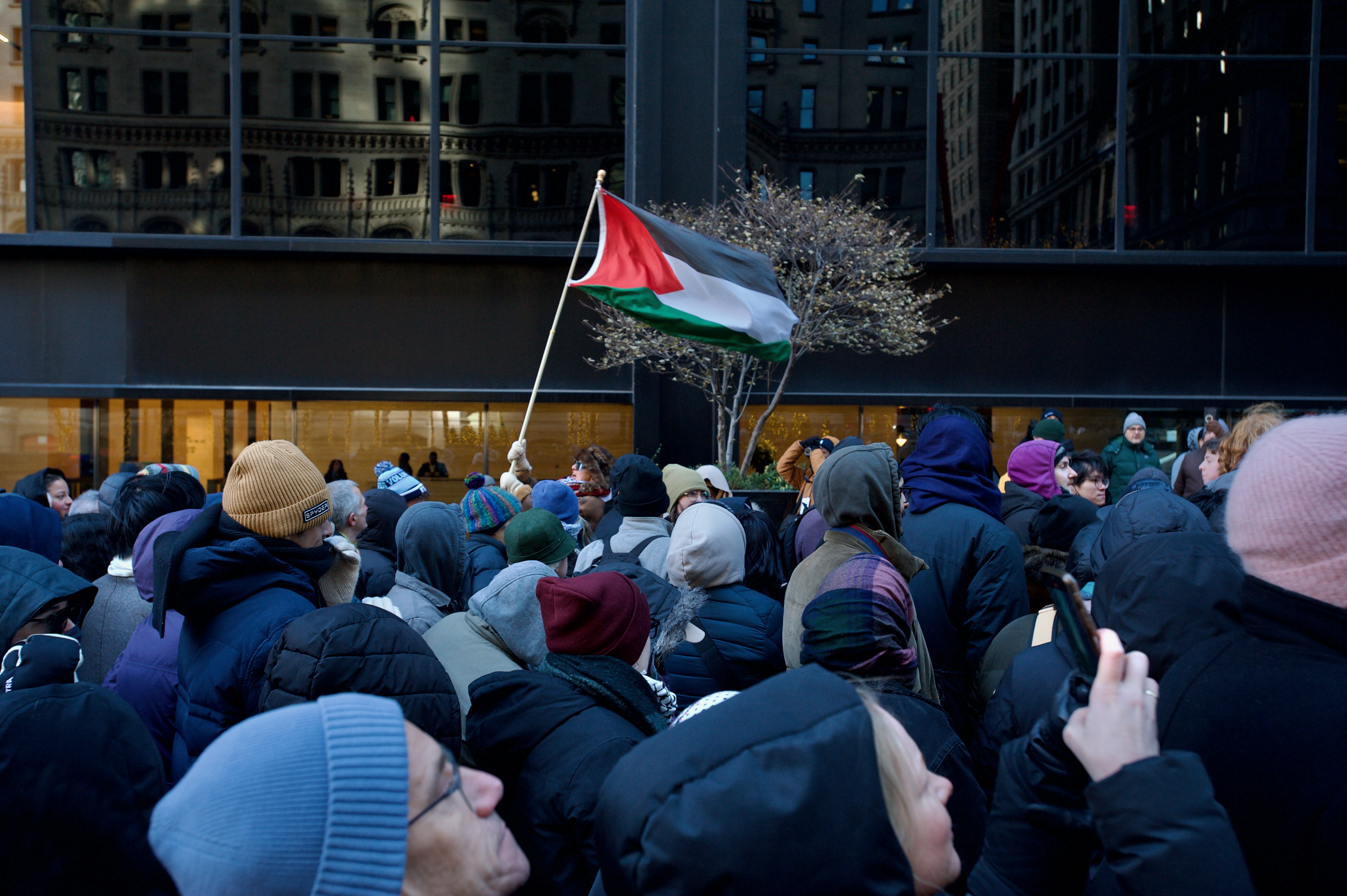
Palestinian flag flown in the crowd of Mamdani's inauguration, January 1, 2026

Mamdani is critical of Israel, condemning Israeli apartheid in 2023. He supports the Boycott, Divestment, and Sanctions (BDS) movement, and in 2023 introduced a state assembly bill named the "Not on our dime!: Ending New York Funding of Israeli Settler Violence Act". The bill prohibited registered charities from donating to organizations involved in Israel's illegal West Bank settlements. A later iteration of the bill added organizations lending support to war crimes in Gaza. The day after the October 7 attacks on Israel, Mamdani issued a statement to "mourn the hundreds of people killed across Israel and Palestine" and saying that the end of "occupation" and "apartheid" was the only path to peace.

In November 2023, Zohran joined Cynthia Nixon in a five day hunger strike outside of Washington DC in support of an immediate ceasefire and opposition to Biden's involvement in support of Israel's offensive in Gaza. He condemned Hamas and the attacks as a "horrific war crime", and criticized celebration of the killings at a rally by the New York City chapter of the DSA as "not befitting of a movement supporting universal human rights". He said that both Hamas and Israel should "put down their weapons". He continued local activism in 2024, holding an iftar for a ceasefire in Gaza during Ramadan. He was also arrested during a ceasefire demonstration.

In 2025, he stated that he believed Israel was committing genocide in Gaza, and that if Benjamin Netanyahu were to travel to New York City, he should be arrested in accordance with the International Criminal Court's warrant for his arrest. In response to the question of whether Israel has a right to exist as a Jewish state, Mamdani has said that it has a right to exist as a state with "equal rights for all", whether as part of a one-state or two-state solution. Mamdani supports the creation of a Palestinian state in the West Bank and Gaza Strip, the end of Israeli settlements in the occupied Palestinian territories and an end to economic, military and cultural Israeli apartheid for Palestinians in Israel. In response to protests against a November 19, 2025, Nefesh B'Nefesh event for individuals interested in emigrating to Israel held at Park East Synagogue, Mamdani's press officer said on his behalf, "He believes every New Yorker should be free to enter a house of worship without intimidation, and that these sacred spaces should not be used to promote activities in violation of international law."

Mamdani chose not to participate in the Israel Day on Fifth in May 2026, an annual parade honoring Israel, making him the first Mayor of New York City since the event's establishment in 1964 to skip the annual celebration. Mamdani was following through on a pledge he had made while campaigning that he would not attend the event. Following the parade, Mamdani criticized the participation of Israeli Finance Minister Bezalel Smotrich and several other Israeli ministers, stating that they represented "a vision of annihilation" and "a complicity in genocide", and that he was offended by their participation in the event.

In July 2026, Mamdani said he was seeking to have Israeli Prime Minister Benjamin Netanyahu arrested should he visit New York for the United Nations General Assembly, and was consulting with the New York City Law Department about whether he had the legal authority to do so. Reiterating his earlier position, Mamdani said he believed Netanyahu "belongs in The Hague" and described him as "a war criminal who has been charged by the International Criminal Court". Later in July, he conceded that New York City does not have the legal authority to execute an International Criminal Court warrant.

In September 2026, Mamdani released a report that pledged to fight antisemitism, in part by using millions of dollars already pledged to fight hate crimes. The report also pledged to support programs celebrating Jewish traditions and expand Holocaust education programs in the city's schools. The report did not mention Israel. Some New York City elected officials criticized the report for not defining antisemitism or discussing any link between anti-Zionism and antisemitism.

On October 7, 2026, the third anniversary of the October 7 attacks, Mamdani issued a statement about the "horrific war crimes" committed and the "more than 1,100 Israelis" killed by Hamas while most of the social media post he released addressed the "more than 74,000 Palestinians" killed and the impact of the Israeli military response during the Gaza war, noting that the "suffering did not begin nor end" on October 7 for those in Gaza. Pro-Israel Jewish representatives criticized the statement, with Rabbi Ammiel Hirsch calling it "morally perverse" while Rabbi Rick Jacobs said it was "callous toward Jewish pain". Sophie Ellman-Golan of Jews for Racial and Economic Justice said that Mamdani's statement had "struck exactly the right tone". Attending a vigil at Union Square Park organized by Israelis for Peace New York, Mamdani was booed by attendees and faced sharp criticism from pro-Palestinian protesters at the event and at protests around the city that sharply criticized the mayor, with an organizing democratic socialist group saying that Mamdani hasn't followed through on campaign pledges and has "repeatedly capitulated to Zionist pressure".

=== Russia and Ukraine ===
In 2025, Mamdani said that if Russian president Vladimir Putin visited New York, he would order Putin's arrest, in accordance with the International Criminal Court's warrant. Mamdani opposes the Russian invasion of Ukraine; he has stated he is less vocal about the war compared to the Gaza war because Russia's actions are not funded by the United States.

=== Armenia ===
In 2026, Mamdani commemorated the 1.5 million victims of the Armenian genocide. He added that in 2020, the military forces of Azerbaijan and Turkey attacked the Armenian population of Nagorno-Karabakh, and in 2023, Azerbaijan expelled more than 100,000 Armenians from the region, which he said was "continuing the genocidal campaign that had begun over 100 years prior".

=== Tibet ===
In July 2026, after Tibetan protestor Lobsang Palden self-immolated in front of the United Nations headquarters to protest China's "Law on Promoting Ethnic Unity and Progress", Mamdani expressed grief over the incident, writing, "No one should reach the point of thinking that such a desperate act is the only way to get the world to listen to you." He also expressed his condolences to New York City's Tibetan diaspora.
