= Vorstadt =

German term for part of a city

In German, a Vorstadt (German: [ˈfoːɐ̯ˌʃtat], literally "fore city") is an area of a city that is outside the Altstadt (city center) but tightly connected to it and densely populated, thus distinguishing itself from a Vorort (suburb).

Historically, a Vorstadt ("suburb" in German) was a settlement outside the city walls, sometimes dedicated to specific trades. Later, large Vorstädte appeared in the Gründerzeit era. Places named Vorstadt include Vorstadt (Königsberg), the Oranienburger Vorstadt in Berlin or the Nordvorstadt (lit. Northern Vorstadt) and the Inner West Vorstadt in Leipzig and other cities in Germany.

Its French equivalent is faubourg; the Dutch equivalent is Voorstad, e.g. Voorstad St. Jacob in Roermond.

== Vienna ==
In Vienna, the historical Vorstädte need to be distinguished from the Vororte. The Vorstädte were located outside the city walls, but within the Linienwall, a second ring of fortifications outside the city. The city walls were located in the place of the modern Ringstraße, while the Linienwall has been removed to give way for the Gürtel (both being rings of streets around the central city). The Vorstädte therefore correspond to the so-called "inner districts" of Vienna (2nd to 9th and 20th districts).
