= Vorort =

German term for 'suburb'

See Tagsatzung for the meaning in historical Switzerland.

Vorort (plural: Vororte) is a German term for a populated area adjacent to a city. Vorort is roughly equivalent to a suburb as that term is understood in Britain and North America, but not in Australia and New Zealand, where a "suburb" of a city is necessarily within the city. Vororte usually have their own business centre. They are the remainders of formerly separate neighbour towns, or have been founded as satellite towns. The term is contrasted with Vorstadt, which describes a more densely populated area grown at the outline of a city centre.

== Switzerland ==
In Swiss history, Vorort referred to the temporary "presidency" of a canton or the cantonal capital. During the Old Swiss Confederacy, the canton or city that convened the Tagsatzung and chaired it was called the Vorort. In the 15th century, the city of Zürich became the de facto Vorort of the Confederacy. Since the Reformation in Switzerland, Lucerne became the Vorort of the Catholic cantons. With the 1798 establishment of the Helvetic Republic the Vororte were abolished and instead Aarau was made capital city, then Lucerne, then Bern. After the Act of Mediation, the "Vorort of Switzerland" would rotate each year between the capital of Aarau and the cities of Zürich, Bern, Lucerne, Fribourg, Solothurn and Basel. In 1815, the choice of Vororte was restricted to Zürich, Bern and Lucerne, who in turn served as biennial seat of government until 1847. In 1848, Bern became the permanent seat of the Swiss Federal Government and thus the de facto capital of Switzerland.

== Vienna ==
In Vienna, the historical terms Vorstädte and Vororte have very specific meanings. The Vorstädte were located outside the city walls, but within the Linienwall, a second ring of fortifications outside the city. The city walls were located in the place of the modern Ringstraße, while the Linienwall has been removed to give way to the Gürtel (both being rings of streets around the central city). All of the historical municipalities were merged into Vienna during the late 19th century. The former Vororte, which have in large parts become as urban as the Vorstädte, now make up Vienna's so-called outer districts (10th to 19th and 21st to 23rd district).
