= Housing in Arizona =

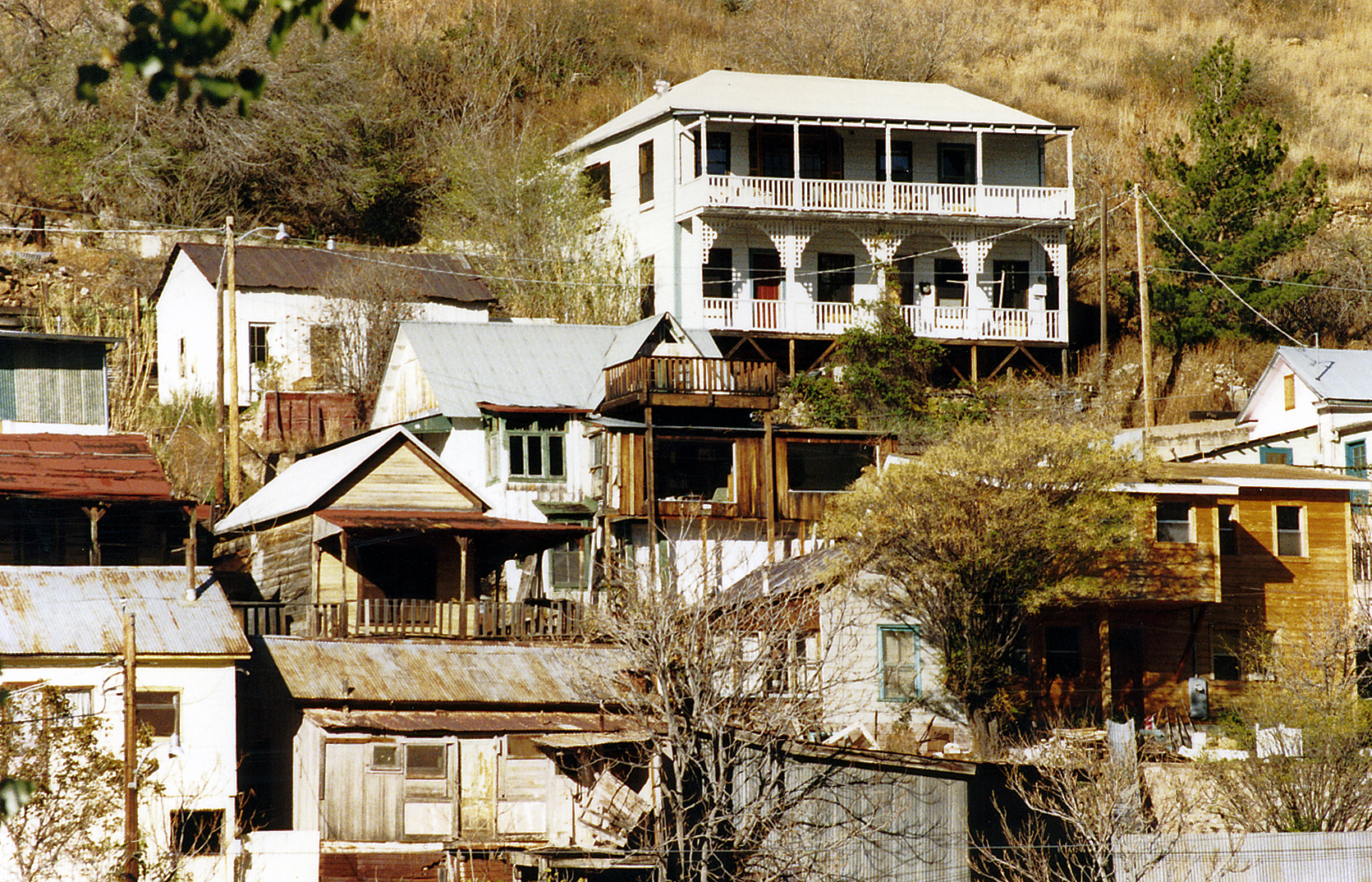
Houses in Bisbee, Arizona, in 1990

Housing in Arizona takes a variety of forms, from single-family homes to apartment complexes. Arizona had a homeownership rate of 62.6% in 2017. Issues related to housing in Arizona include homeownership, affordable housing, housing insecurity, zoning, and homelessness.

== Background ==
According to the U.S. Census Bureau, there were 3,082,000 housing units in Arizona in 2020. There were an estimated 8,280 homeless individuals in Arizona in 2020, according to the Annual Homeless Assessment Report.

The U.S. Department of Housing and Urban Development administers programs that provide housing and community development assistance in the United States. Adequate housing is recognized as human right in the 1948 Universal Declaration of Human Rights and in the 1966 International Covenant on Economic, Social and Cultural Rights.

== See also ==
- Housing in the United States
- Homelessness in the United States
- Homeownership in the United States
- Housing insecurity in the United States
- Affordable housing in the United States
- Subsidized housing in the United States
