= Housing in Alaska =

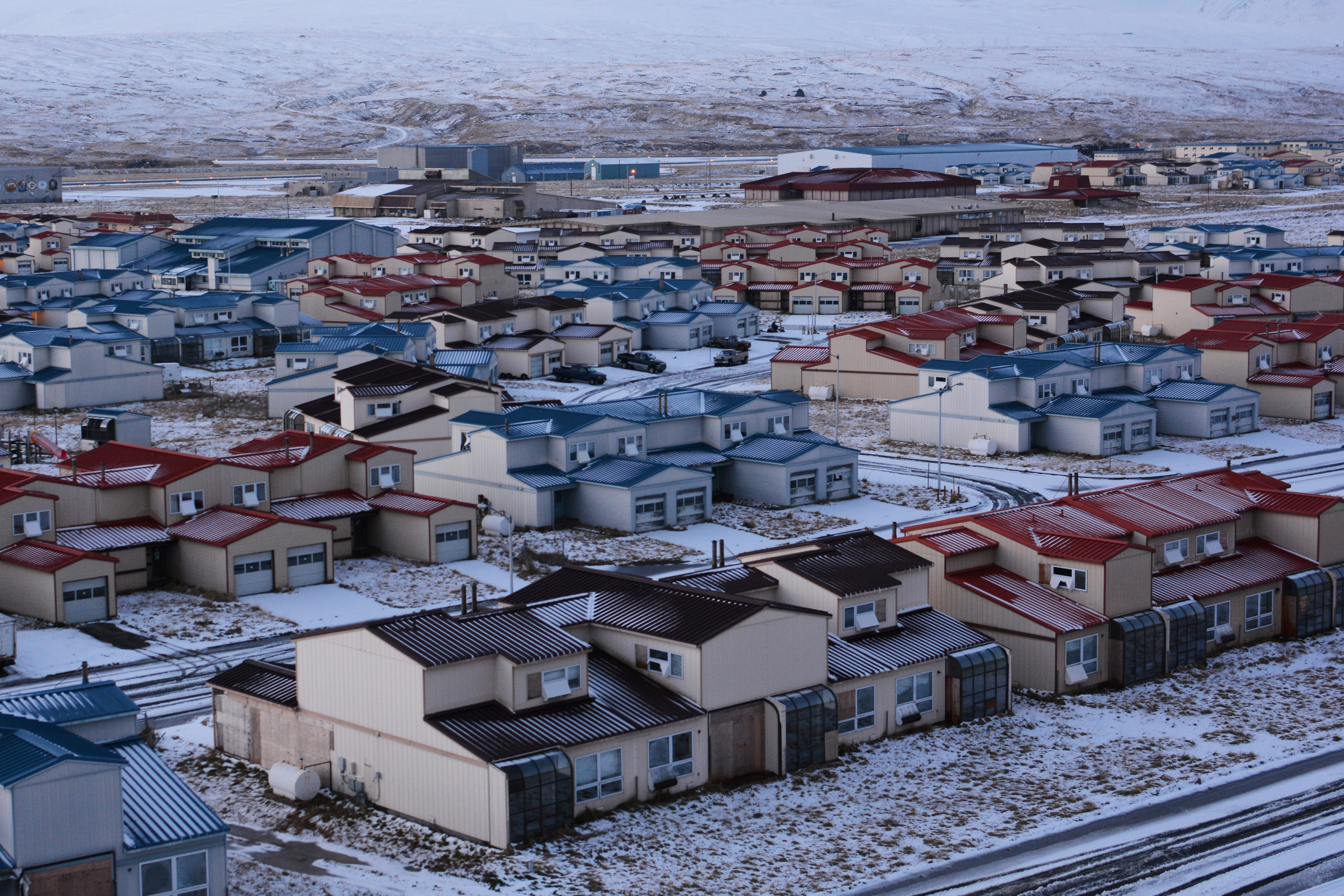
Residences in Adak, Adak Island, Aleutian Islands, Alaska in 2014

Housing in Alaska takes a variety of forms, from single-family homes to apartment complexes. Alaska had a homeownership rate of 66.5% in 2017. Issues related to housing in Alaska include homeownership, affordable housing, housing insecurity, zoning, and homelessness.

== Background ==
According to the U.S. Census Bureau, there were 326,200 housing units in Alaska in 2020. There were an estimated 1,445 homeless individuals in Alaska in 2020, according to the Annual Homeless Assessment Report.

The U.S. Department of Housing and Urban Development administers programs that provide housing and community development assistance in the United States. Adequate housing is recognized as human right in the 1948 Universal Declaration of Human Rights and in the 1966 International Covenant on Economic, Social and Cultural Rights.

== See also ==
- Housing in the United States
- Homelessness in the United States
- Homeownership in the United States
- Housing insecurity in the United States
- Affordable housing in the United States
- Subsidized housing in the United States
