= Housing in the United States =

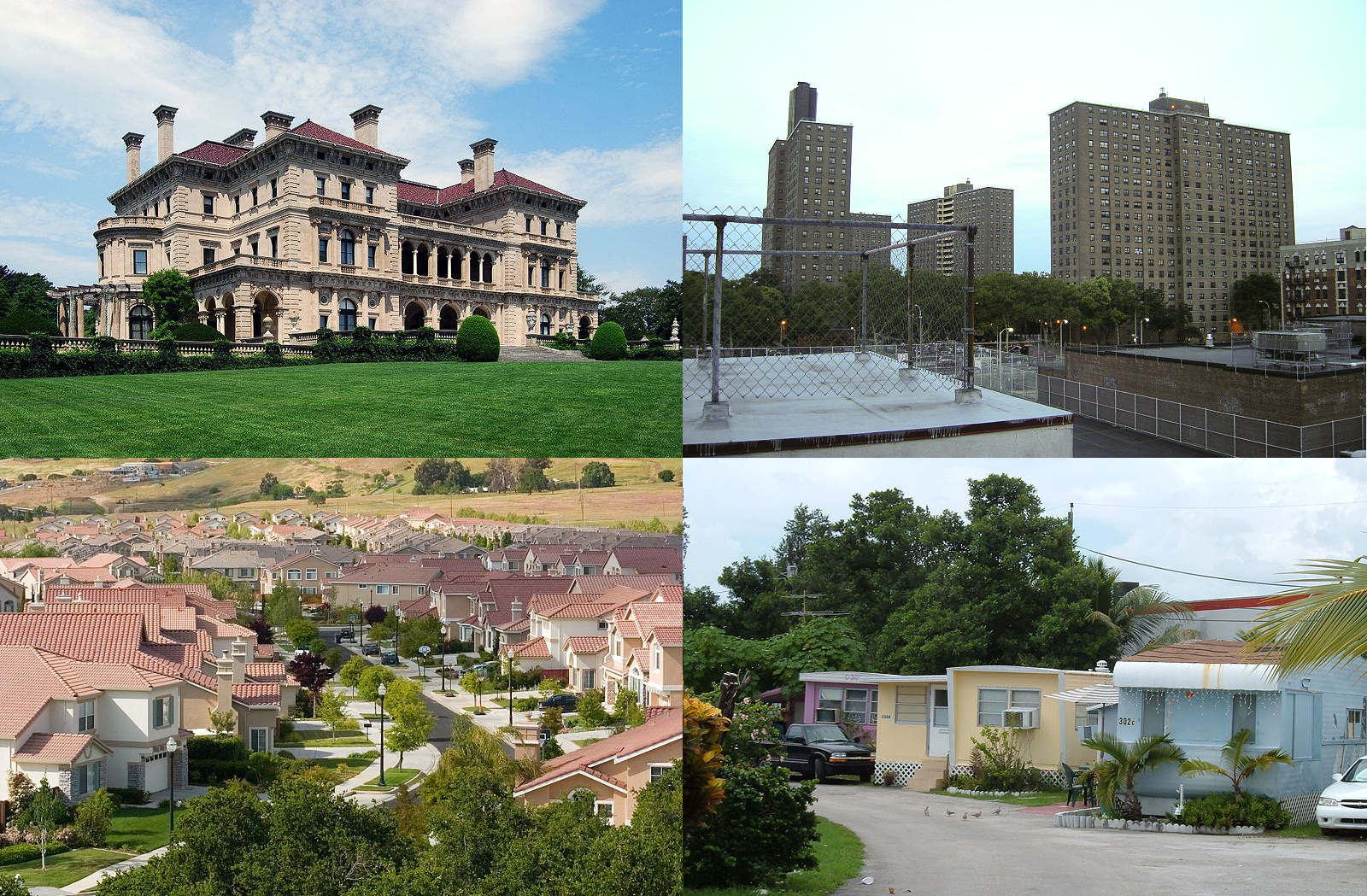
Various types of housing in the United States

Housing in the United States comes in a variety of forms and tenures. The rate of homeownership in the United States, as measured by the fraction of units that are owner-occupied, was 64% as of 2017.

Housing in the United States is heavily commodified, and when viewed as an economic sector, contributes to 15% of the gross domestic product. The amount of public housing is capped via the Faircloth Limit, and when available can only be offered to households meeting certain eligibility requirements.

More than half a million people are homeless. The geographic patterns of homelessness in the United States are explained by the high cost and low availability of housing.

== Overview ==
Housing as shelter is one of the "basic needs" of humans, offering protection against the elements. It also provides a place of privacy away from the public eye where daily activities can take place. Residents often have personal attachment to a house, making it a home. A home's location, style and access to schools, parks, and other amenities can align a household to a greater community to reinforce cultural or religious bonds. These characteristics can also reinforce residential segregation and unequal access to amenities.

Housing is also important to developers, builders, lenders, realtors, investors, architects, and other specialized professions and trades. These groups view housing as a commodity for financial gain.

As the United States industrialized in the 20th century, demand for housing fueled job growth and consumer products to create economic growth. By the 1970s, the United States was being deindustrialized, and regional economies began to diverge: previously manufacturing-focused cities in the Rust Belt and elsewhere experienced population decline, and housing costs rose drastically in urban regions such as New York, San Francisco and Boston. In 2016, housing costs in two thirds of the United States exceeded wage growth. Housing prices have risen dramatically since the Covid pandemic and are unlikely to change anytime soon. In January 2020, the median home price was $290,499 – nearly 45% lower than the median home price in May 2023.

Recent trends also show that more homeowners are leveraging accumulated equity to make all‑cash purchases. Between 2023 and 2024, approximately 26 % of U.S. buyers used home equity to buy their next home outright, while in Dane County, Wisconsin, 17 % of homes sold in May 2025 were purchased with cash—underscoring the growing role of equity in sustaining demand despite rising prices.

For households earning 30% of the county's median income, most counties in the United States do not have rental housing considered affordable to at least half that income segment (one-third of 30% of median).

U.S. housing statistics
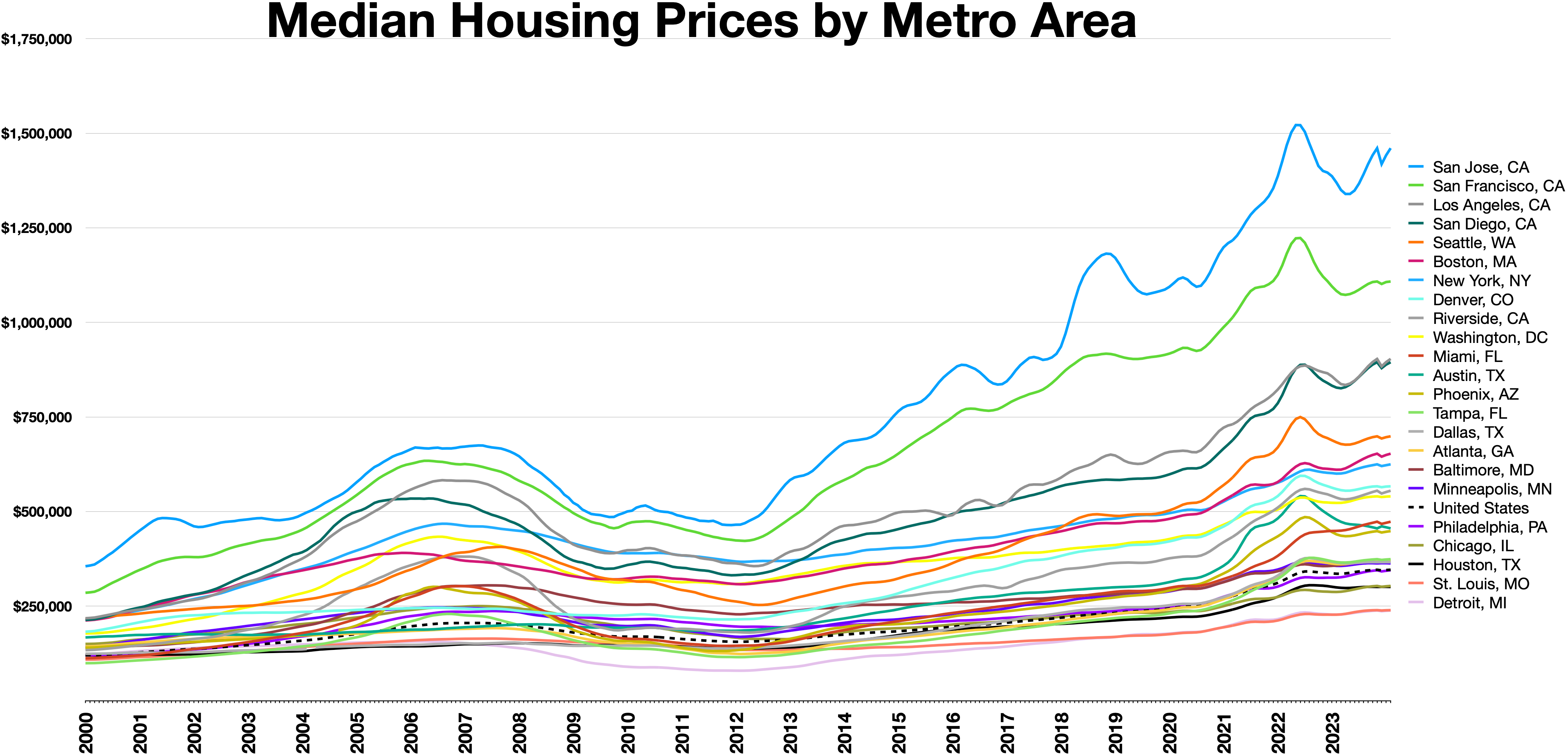
Median housing price by metro area

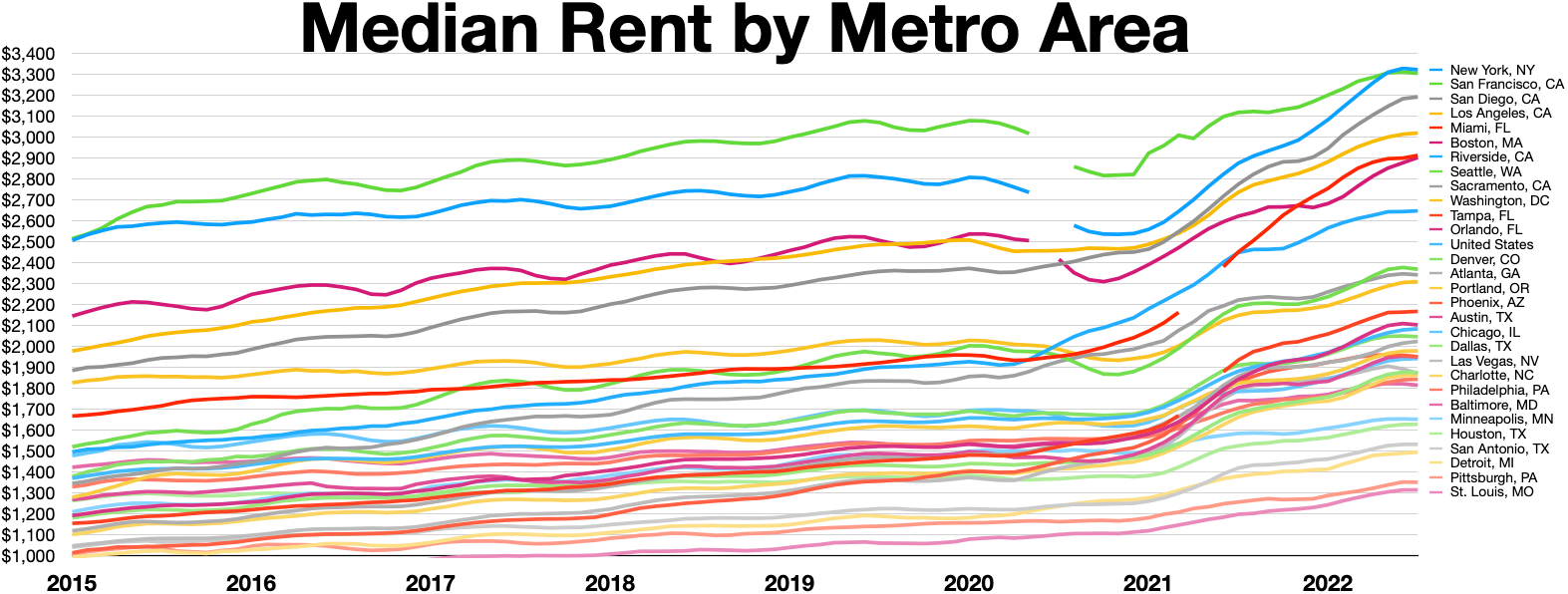
Median rent by metro area

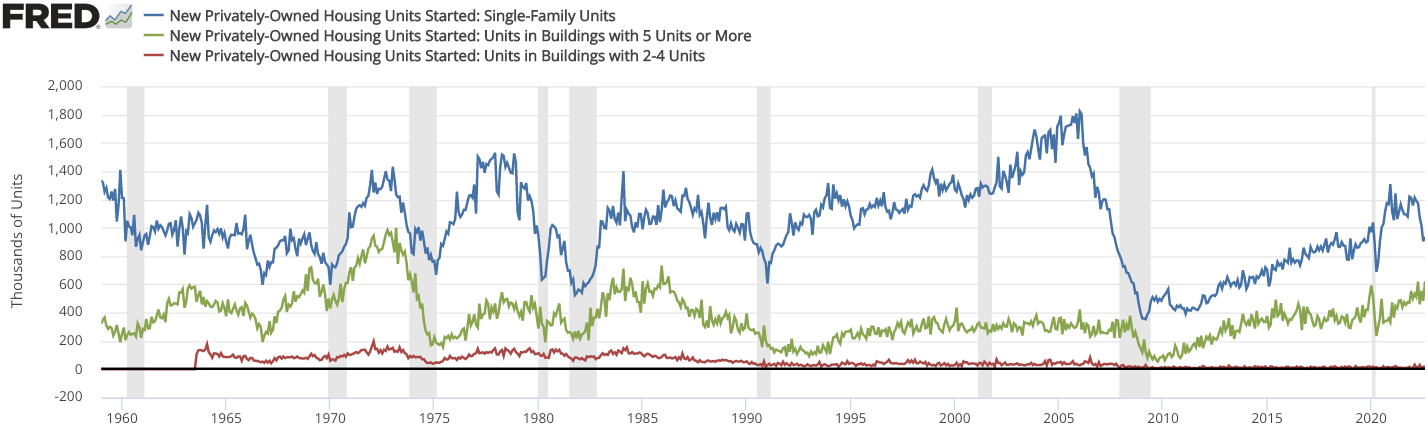
Housing starts in the United States, 1959–2021
Single family home
Multifamily residential
2-4 unit residential

Median age of US homebuyers has increased over recent decades

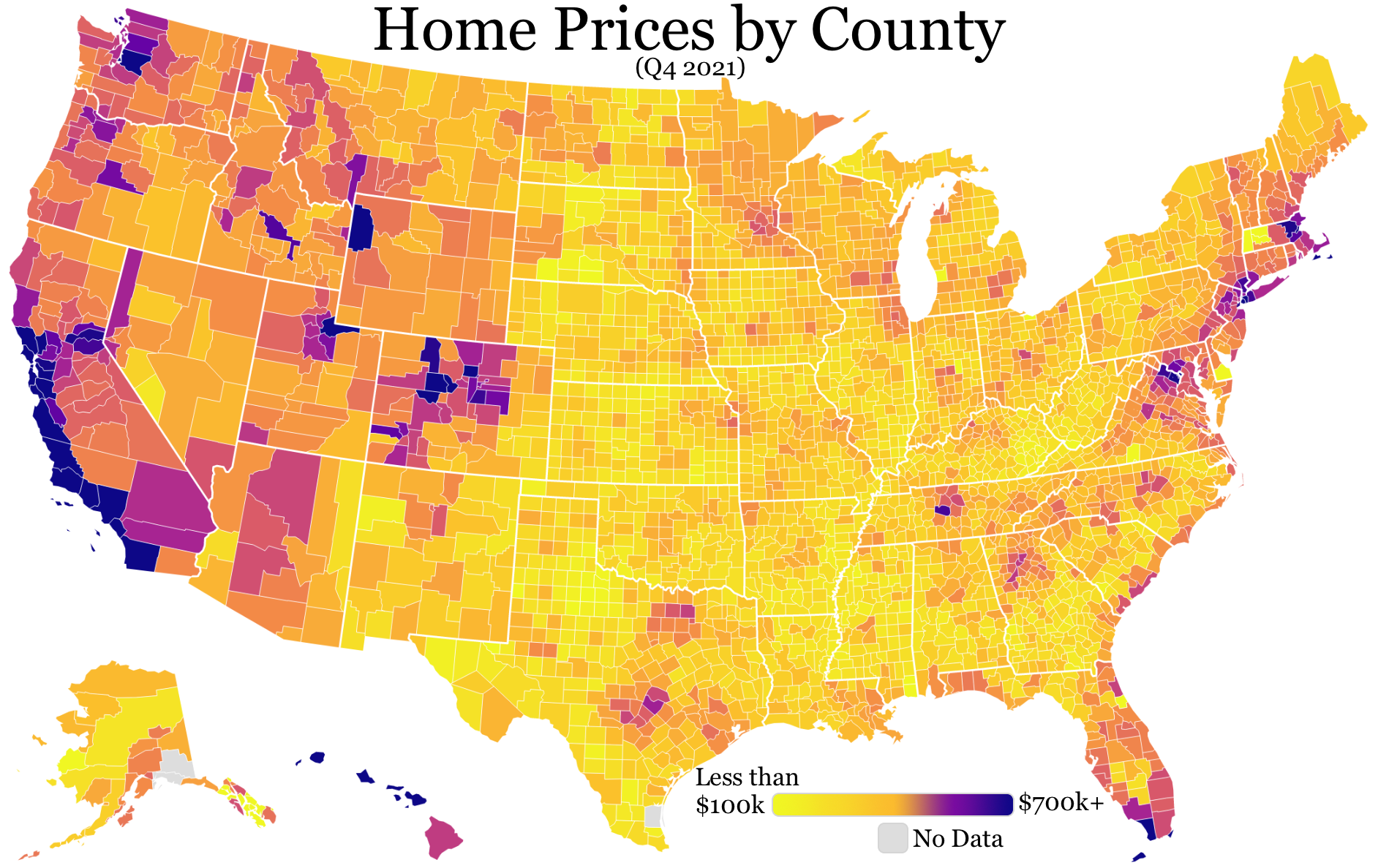
Home prices by county (2021): <$100,000; $200,000; $300,000; $400,000; $500,000; $600,000; $700,000+.

Median cost of rent for a 1 bedroom

== Construction and quality ==
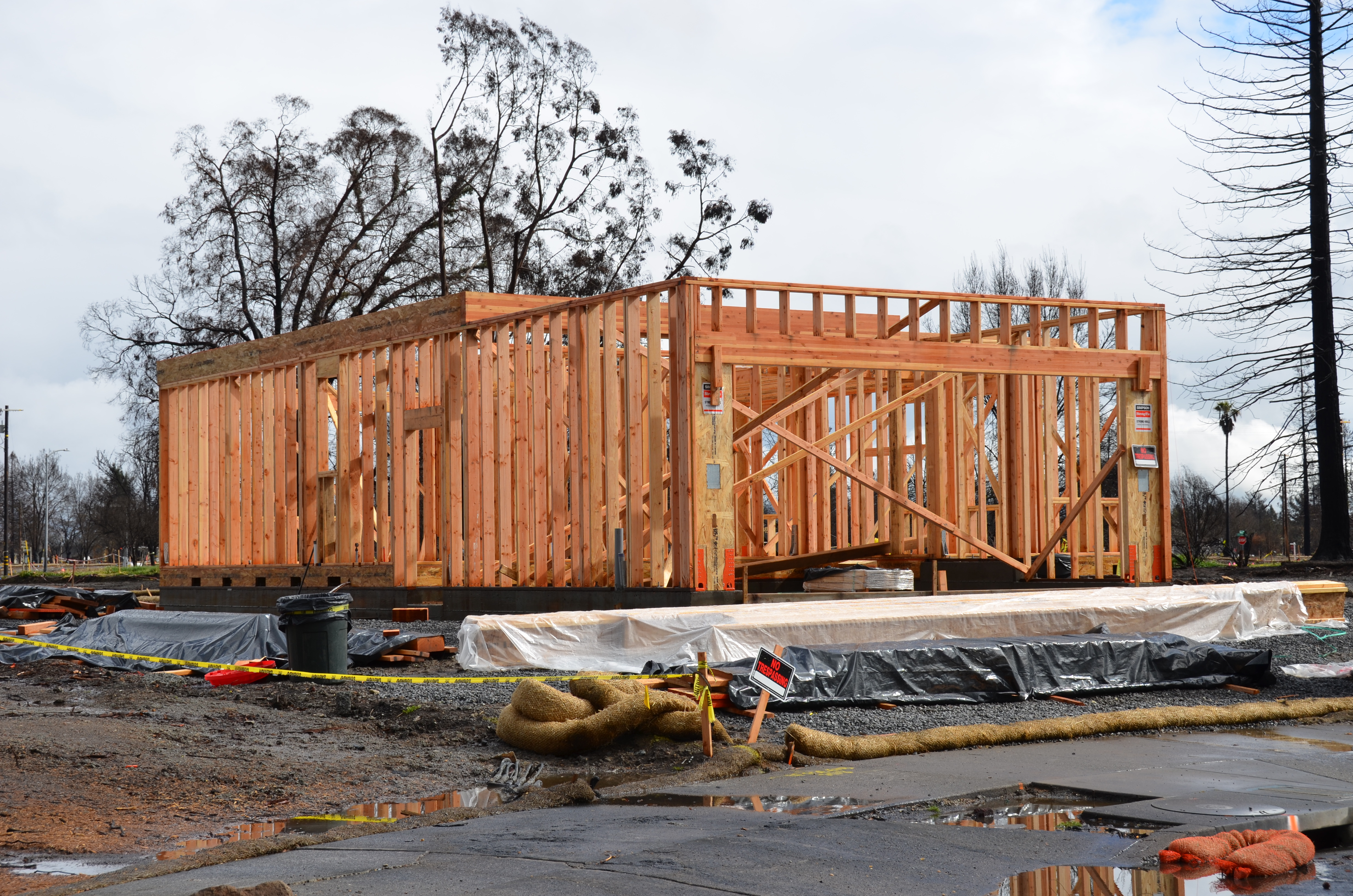
A wooden home is reconstructed following a wildfire in California.

Wood framing is widely used in home construction in the United States, accounting for 90% of new houses in 2019. Concrete is used to build a foundation, usually with either a crawl space, or basement included. Interiors usually have drywall. Roofing often consists of asphalt shingles, although steel, and tile materials are also used.

Wood-frame construction in the United States is more cost effective than masonry, in part because bricks typically must be shipped farther and labor costs are higher; however, it is perceived to be flimsy in comparison to typical European construction. The federal government and insurance agencies have tried to promote concrete-frame construction and other basic techniques for resisting extreme weather events, but with little success: a 2017 report by McKinsey concluded that "the productivity of construction remains stuck at the same level as 80 years ago".

20th-century land use policies such as single-family zoning, along with federal financial incentives, promoted the suburban sprawl of housing into disaster-prone areas. In 1998, urban theorist Mike Davis recounted in Ecology of Fear how suburbs of Los Angeles such as Malibu, regularly assailed by wildfires, were offered a variety of federal tax incentives, low-interest loans, and temporary relaxations in building codes that resulted in houses being repeatedly rebuilt in the same places and with largely the same methods that facilitated the fire destruction in the first place. In the 21st century, some property insurers will no longer offer home insurance policies in regions where houses are often destroyed by weather events such as wildfires or hurricanes. Attention on the disaster of suburban sprawl was renewed when a a series of wildfires in Los Angeles in January 2025 killed several dozen people, destroyed more than 10,000 homes, displaced more than 100,000 people, and were estimated to be the costliest wildfires in US history so far.

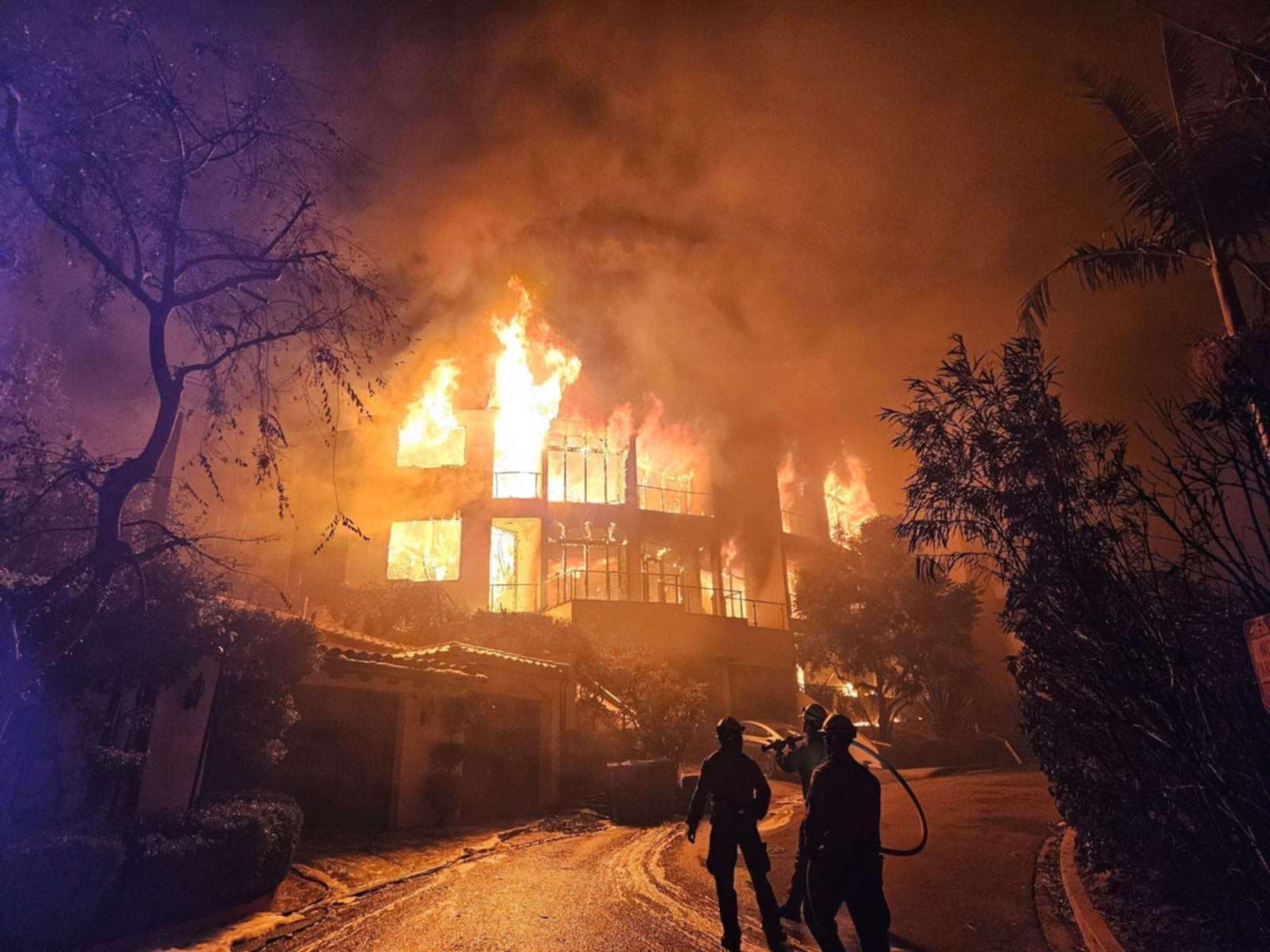
A house burns in the 2025 Palisades Fire in California.

The typical age of a home varies by state, with a national median of 39 years. A 2016 report by the Center for American Progress found that 30 million homes have health or safety hazards, such as problems with plumbing, natural gas, or heating; 6 million of these homes have structural problems. Structural failures in condominium or apartment buildings have resulted in catastrophic loss of life, as in the 2021 Surfside condominium collapse. Many of the 160,000 condominium buildings in the United States do not have sufficient funds to carry out major repairs.

Poor-quality housing in the United States is associated with increases in chronic illnesses such as asthma and eczema, as well as the negative effects from the persistence of environmental lead (e.g., from lead paint that has not been removed). These effects are particularly acute in the dilapidated housing characteristic of dense urban environments.

In March 2025, spring home-building construction starts fell 11.4% from February amid tariff increases on materials including steel, glass, and lumber, according to a March data report from the U.S. Census Bureau Index of Economic Activity.

== Supply ==
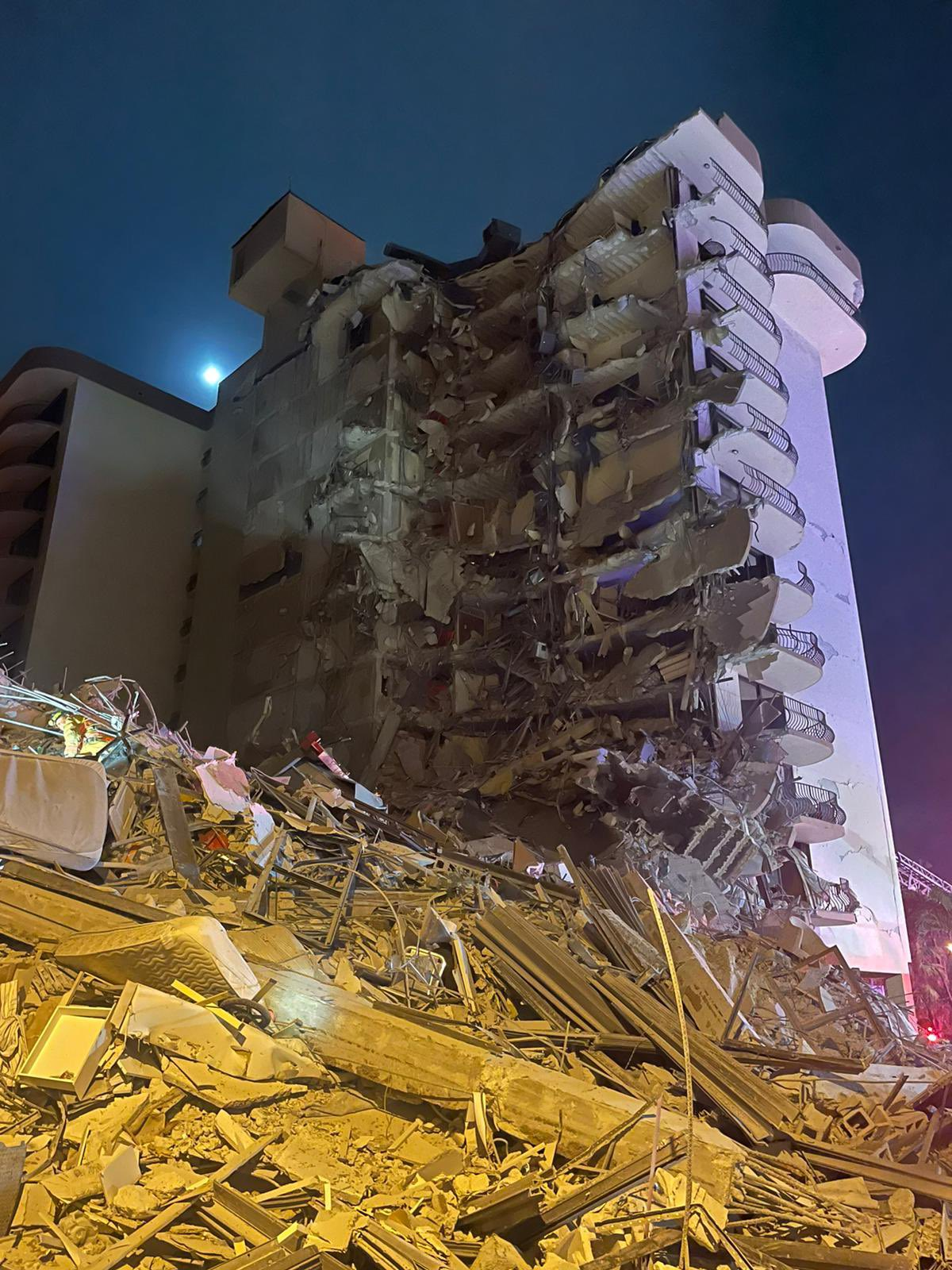
The 2021 Surfside condominium collapse briefly focused the country's attention on the structural integrity of its housing.

There are about 140.5 million homes in the United States as of the 2020 Census. Housing researchers generally conclude that the supply of housing in the United States is too low to meet demand, resulting in an affordability crisis. Among the renting population, nearly half pay more than 30% of their income toward rent.

=== Local politics and zoning ===
Although a nationwide problem, the undersupply of housing is caused in large part by local community actions that discourage new development. These include regulations such as single-family zoning, minimum parking requirements, and height restriction laws that limit the density of new residences within a municipality or increase the expense and difficulty of construction. New construction often requires a public comment process, which arose in response to the excesses of urban renewal in the 1960s. While intended to broaden community participation in local development, this process is often dominated by a socioeconomically advantaged subset of the neighborhood: in Massachusetts, for example, "the individuals who participate in community meetings on new housing developments differ starkly from the broader population. They are older, whiter, longtime residents, and more likely to be homeowners. They overwhelmingly oppose the development of new housing[. ... T]hese forums are dominated by an unrepresentative and privileged group of neighborhood defenders." These meetings are often seen as a manifestation of nimbyism, in which existing residents, especially those who own property, leverage the regulatory process in order to stymie new construction. In particular, the suppression of moderate-density housing such as duplexes and townhouses has resulted in a so-called missing middle problem that drives up housing scarcity and inhibits the development of walkable neighborhoods.

Environmental regulations such as the California Environmental Quality Act are often leveraged against new housing development.

=== Public housing ===
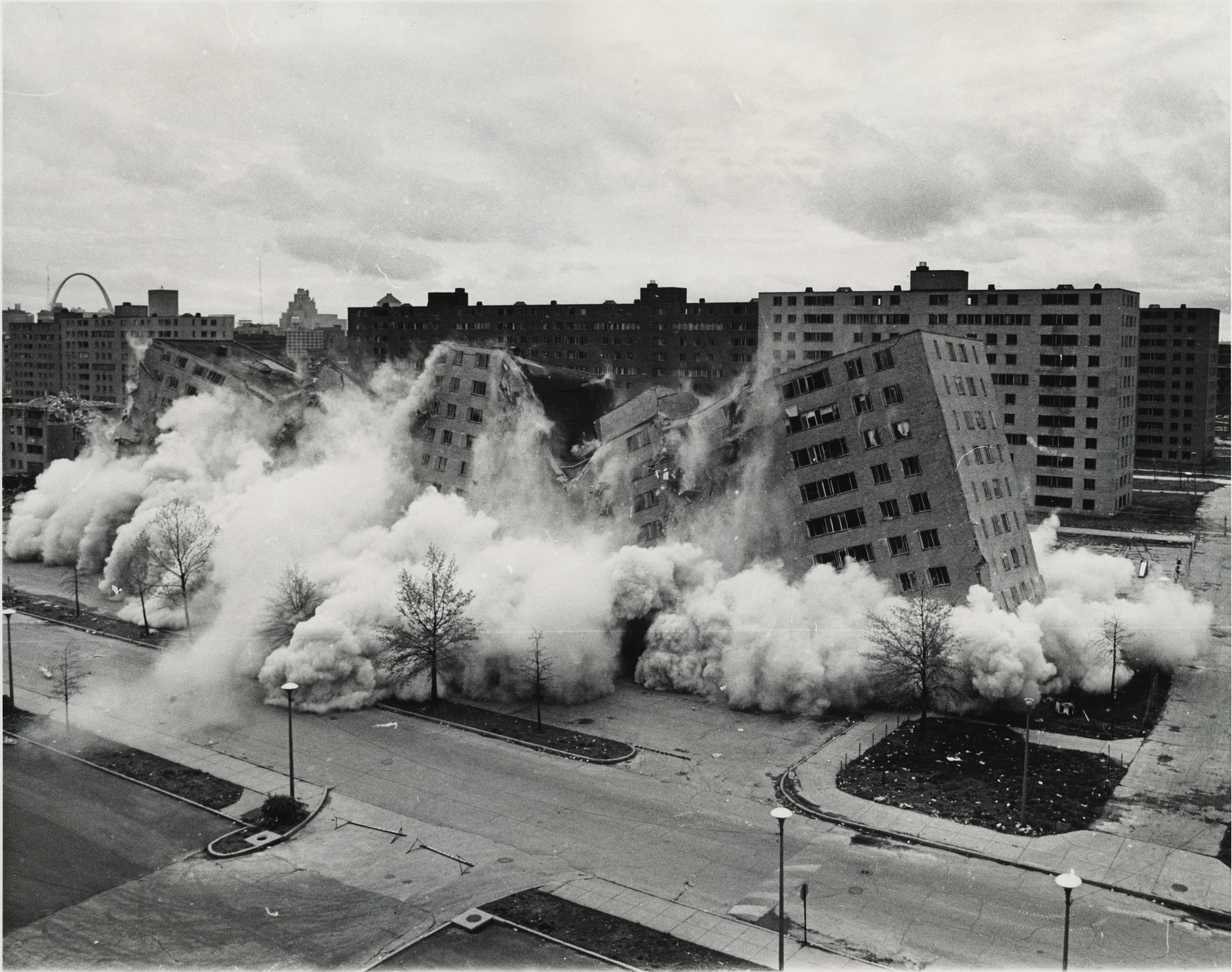
For many, the demolition of Pruitt–Igoe in St. Louis was symbolic of the US attitude to public housing. The Pruitt–Igoe site remains largely vacant.

Federal efforts at public housing began in the 1930s, with a series of New Deal efforts culminating in the Housing Act of 1937. This created the United States Housing Authority as a centralized agency with the power to disburse funds, while the work of building and maintaining public housing projects was largely devolved onto state and municipal public housing authorities. From the outset, public housing was tied to the notion of "slum clearance", and the 1937 Act required that for every unit of public housing that was built, another unit had to be eliminated. Additionally, to protect the commodified housing market, the 1937 Act, and the 1949 Act that followed it, effectively restricted public housing to low-income households, thereby concentrating poverty into these housing projects. The 1949 Act also required that targets of slum clearance (by then called "urban renewal") be given preference in public housing projects, further concentrating poverty.

The federal government began to enmesh public housing with private development through a series of acts in 1959, 1961, 1965, and 1968, and 1970. The Housing and Community Development Act of 1974 established the Section 8 program, which directs public housing money to private landlords via means-tested rental assistance. Private subsidy was coupled with an underinvestment in public housing, and large projects such as Cabrini–Green in Chicago and Pruitt–Igoe in St. Louis became notorious for their squalor.

The amount of public housing crested in the 1990s, with about 1.4 million units. Today, the number of units has been reduced to 1.0 million. The fraction of US households receiving public or subsidized housing is far lower than the fraction in Western Europe.

=== Commodification ===
Economists have noted increasing ownership of housing units by investors keeping the units vacant or renting them to the exclusion of traditional homebuyers. Investors bought about one of every seven U.S. homes in the first quarter of 2021, up from the prior three quarters, in which they bought closer to 1 in 10 homes.

=== Statistics about housing stock ===
According to the 2020 United States Census, the country had a total of 140 million housing units, of which 127 million (90%) were occupied and 14 million (10%) were classified as being vacant, irrespective of status ("for rent", "rented, not occupied", "for sale only", "sold, not occupied", "for seasonal, recreational, or occasional use", among others). Of the occupied units, 80 million units (63%) were owner-occupied, while 47 million units (34%) were occupied by tenants.

In the 2024 1-year American Community Survey, the median number of rooms in a housing unit was 5.5, with the most common amount of rooms for a housing unit being 5 per unit. Homes have more excess bedrooms (bedrooms which are not occupied) than compared to 1970 and 1980, but home sizes on average have decreased since the 2010s.

== Homelessness ==
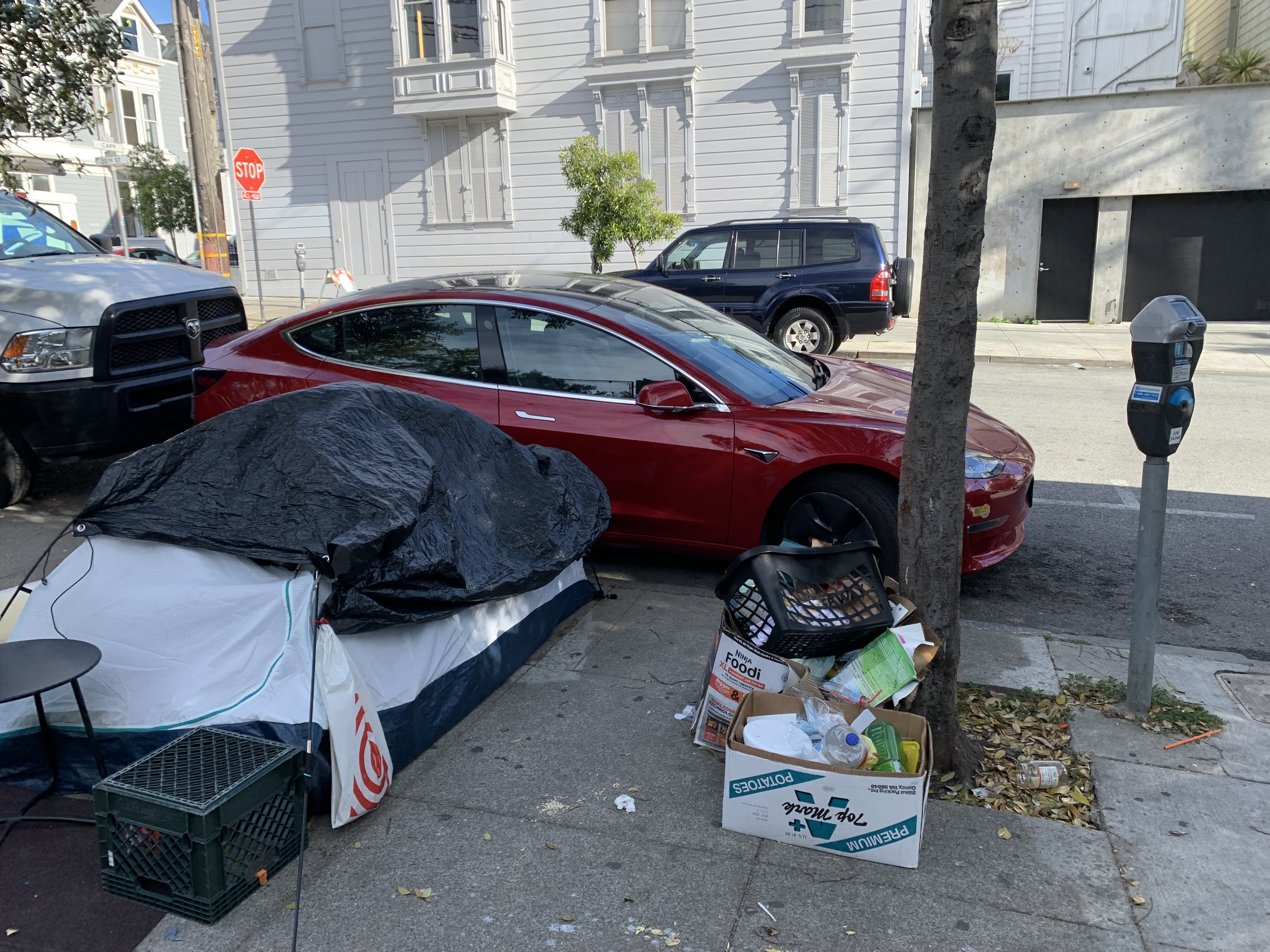
A homeless encampment across the street from a Victorian-era house in San Francisco

In 2014, approximately 1.5 million homeless people resided in shelters. As of 2018, the Department of Housing and Urban Development reported there were roughly 553,000 homeless people in the United States on a given night, or 0.17% of the population. Recent spikes in the homeless population include a 44% increase in Seattle in 2017 and 16% in the city of Los Angeles in 2019. According to the US Department of Housing and Urban Development's Annual Homeless Assessment Report, as of 2024 there were around 771,480 homeless people in the United Stateson a given night, or about 23 of every 10,000 people. Homelessness increased from 2016 to 2020, along with deaths among the homeless population.

There is some geographic variation in the rate of homelessness, which is correlated with the cost and availability of housing. Popular alternative explanations such as rates of mental illness or drug addiction do not explain the observed geographic variation in homelessness rates, nor do differences in regional climates.

Statistics for homelessness in the United States

In 2025, reports indicated that the Emergency Housing Voucher (EHV) program, launched during the COVID-19 pandemic to assist individuals at risk of homelessness, was running out of funds earlier than expected and could end by mid-2026, potentially impacting tens of thousands of recipients.

== See also ==
- Housing insecurity in the United States
- Housing crisis in the United States
- California housing shortage
- New York City housing shortage
