= Affordable housing in the United States =

Percent of renters in different affordability categories, US, 2022
less than 30 percent of monthly gross - Affordable	50%
more than 30 percent, but less than 50 percent - Burdened	23%
more than 50 percent of monthly gross - Severely burdened	27%
About half of renters in the US had an affordable rental arrangement, and about half did not.

The term "affordable housing" refers to housing that is considered economically accessible for individuals and families whose household income falls at or below the Area Median Income (AMI), as evaluated by either national or local government authorities through an officially recognized housing affordability index. However, in the United States, the term is mostly used to refer to housing units that are deed restricted (for typically at least 30 years) to households considered Low-Income (80% of AMI), Very Low-Income (50% of AMI), and Extremely Low-Income (30% of AMI). These units are often constructed by non-profit "affordable housing developers" who use a combination of private money and government subsidies. For-profit developers, when building market-rate developments, may include some "affordable" units (often 10-30%), if required as part of a city's inclusionary zoning mandate.

Housing has consistently been the largest expenditure within the average American family's financial plan. Housing expenses have also traditionally outpaced income growth, especially impacting those who rent their residences. Following the Great Recession in 2008, there has been a substantial decline in the rate of home ownership, leading to increases in foreclosures and short sales. This, in turn, has driven a surge in the number of individuals and families opting to rent homes, causing greater rental expenses.

According to the 2024 American Community Survey one-year estimates, median gross rent, including utilities, rose by 2.7 percent in inflation-adjusted terms, from $1,448 in 2023 to $1,487 in 2024. The median share of income paid toward rent remained 31 percent.

The National Low Income Housing Coalition (NLIHC) released its annual report, Out of Reach: The High Cost of Housing in June 2023, showing a disparity between people's earnings and the cost of modest rental housing across the U.S. It emphasizes how rising rents, coupled with the end of COVID-19 pandemic-era support programs, are intensifying financial instability for low-income renters. The report's key figure, the "Housing Wage," reveals the hourly earnings necessary for full-time workers to afford fair market rental homes without exceeding 30% of their incomes. Nationally, the 2023 Housing Wage is $28.58 per hour for a modest two-bedroom home and $23.67 per hour for a one-bedroom home. The findings emphasize that housing remains unaffordable for workers across various job types and income levels. Sixty percent of workers earn less than the hourly wage required for a two-bedroom home, and nearly 50% earn less than the one-bedroom Housing Wage.

Some of the main issues which lead to the need for affordable housing are homelessness, the housing affordability crisis, and historic housing discrimination against people of color. The reported effects of affordable housing range from improved health and educational outcomes to reduced homelessness. A series of legislative steps have been taken to address different aspects of housing policy in the United States, including the National Housing Act of 1934, Housing Act of 1937, Housing Act of 1949, and Fair Housing Act of 1968. Together, these acts represent a progression of federal housing policy, from facilitating mortgage insurance and creating public housing options to emphasizing the importance of affordable and equitable housing opportunities, while also addressing discrimination and promoting fair housing practices. Government policies and programs, such as subsidized housing, tax incentives, and inclusionary zoning, coupled with innovative solutions like tenant protections, mixed-income developments, and homeownership programs, have contributed to shaping the affordable housing landscape in the U.S.

In 2025, U.S. News & World Report published a list of cities with affordable housing offering some 1br apartments in the range of $500-$600 per month.

== Housing discrimination and equity ==
=== Homelessness ===
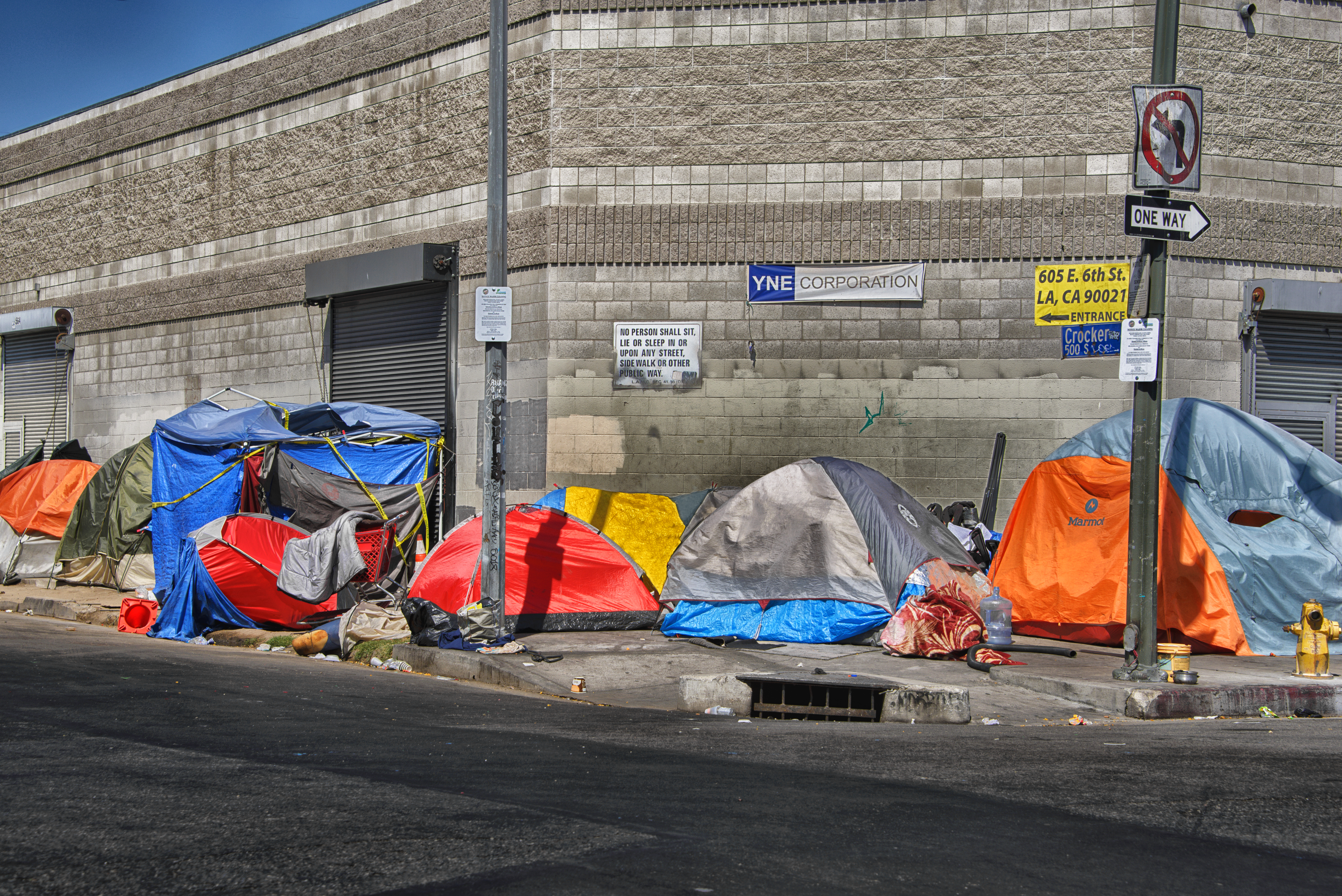
Tents of homeless people on the sidewalk in Skid Row, Los Angeles

Central to public discourse on housing affordability is the conversation surrounding advocacy for unhoused and homeless individuals. The evolution of homelessness within the U.S. has been characterized by significant changes not only in perceived solutions, but also in the gradual politicization of statewide provisioning for unhoused and displaced persons. Homelessness first emerged as a national issue in the early 1870s, although the term originally referred to "itinerant 'tramps' traversing the country in search of work," attributing the solution to homelessness as one of employment and job provision rather than affordable and accessible housing.

The advent of "muckraking" journalism, led by reform-focused journalists in the early 1900s Progressive Era who were focused on exposing corruption and "the realities of the American people" to the public, helped shed new light on the issue of homelessness and displacement. Particularly notable is the work of Danish photojournalist Jacob Riis, most known for his series "How the Other Half Lives." Riis's photography work revealed the deplorable living conditions of those occupying U.S. slums and tenements, drawing more public attention towards the issue of homelessness. This awareness helped to usher in the "Modern Era" of the housing movement, as advocates and civil rights activists attempted to address the low supply of affordable housing, a worsening recession, and continued gentrification of inner city spaces.

The homelessness experience for individuals simultaneously coping with severe mental disorders is often intrinsically tied to the extended "institutional circuit" intended to function as a solution to residential instability. In a 1995 research study that interviewed applicants for a homeless shelter judged to be severely mentally ill in Westchester County, New York, researchers found that shelters functioned as "part of a more extended institutional circuit, as a temporary source of transitional housing, as a surrogate for exhausted support from kin, and as a haphazard resource in essentially nomadic lives." This perpetuation of short-term countermeasures to homelessness, all while de-prioritizing long-term options for stable and appropriate housing, raises the issue of whether shelters and existing institutional models are fully addressing the needs of mentally ill clients who have been displaced or houseless.

With the existing reliance on community shelters to accommodate mentally ill clients, the reinforcement of housing as a public need is also coupled by the de-institutionalization of mental illnesses previously addressed in custody and asylum. The rise of the 1960s civil rights movement led to more public demands for severely mentally ill patients to be removed from the "deplorable environments" perpetuated by mental hospitals, asylums, and the like. Legal restrictions on institutionalization have pointed towards placing the responsibility of care on a largely decentralized mental care system.

=== Redlining ===
After the Great Depression and the subsequent wave of home foreclosures, the federal government created new organizations to make affordable home mortgages more accessible. These agencies included the Home Owners' Loan Corporation (HOLC) and Federal Housing Administration (FHA). HOLC and FHA conducted extensive evaluations of neighborhoods to assess their investment risk, a practice known as "redlining," which took into consideration the racial composition of residents.

Redlining led to the systematic denial of various services, particularly mortgage loans, insurance, and other financial services, to people in specific neighborhoods based on their racial or ethnic composition. This practice has had a long-lasting impact on housing affordability and access to homeownership for minority communities in the United States. Redlining became widespread in the 1930s and continued for several decades but was officially banned with the passage of the Fair Housing Act in 1968 and the Community Reinvestment Act in 1977. The discriminatory practice of redlining used by governments made it extremely difficult for residents of redlined neighborhoods to accumulate wealth.

Although redlining is no longer a formal practice, its legacy continues to influence patterns of housing discrimination, disparities in homeownership rates, and access to housing and community resources for minority populations. The 2023 Out of Reach report by the National Low Income Housing Coalition highlights a substantial housing cost disparity for people of color, particularly women of color. The report's key figure, the "Housing Wage," reveals the hourly earnings necessary for full-time workers to afford fair market rental homes without exceeding 30% of their incomes. Nationally, while the median wage of a full-time white worker surpasses the one-bedroom Housing Wage by $2.23, full-time Black and Latino workers fall short by approximately $0.73 and $1.84, respectively. The disparity worsens for women of color, with Black and Latina female workers earning median wages that are $3.96 and $5.47 less than the one-bedroom Housing Wage, respectively.

Additionally, an ecologic study published by SSM – Population Health in 2021 found a strong correlation between past instances of redlining and ongoing instances of discriminatory lending practices in Milwaukee County. More specifically, the researchers identified a direct link between redlining and adverse mental and physical health outcomes within the city. The observed pattern of increased lending discrimination corresponding with declining health indicates that structural racism, evident in historical and contemporary lending disinvestment, serves as a predictor for poor health outcomes in the deeply segregated neighborhoods of Milwaukee.

== Government policies and programs ==
=== Subsidized housing ===
Various government policies and programs have been put in place to address affordable housing. One such program is the Section 8 Housing Choice Voucher Program, which the U.S. Department of Housing and Urban Development (HUD) uses to provide rental assistance vouchers to eligible low-income households. The program offers financial aid to households with an annual gross income not surpassing 50% of HUD's median income criteria. HUD mandates that 75% of newly enrolled households should fall at or below 30% of the area's median income. Eligibility considers various factors such as household income, size, composition, citizenship status, assets, and essential expenses like healthcare and childcare. In the United States, the widely accepted standard for identifying households with extremely low incomes is either income at or below the federal poverty guideline or 30% of the area median income (AMI), whichever is higher.

An empirical research study aimed at gauging the impact of government-subsidized housing in mitigating homelessness concluded that these housing initiatives did not effectively prioritize individuals at the highest risk of experiencing homelessness. Consequently, a mere expansion of current housing programs administered by the HUD is unlikely to significantly reduce the homeless population. This study published in the Journal of Policy Analysis and Management proposes an adjustment to Section 8 programs. It suggests the restructuring of these programs by decreasing subsidies for each income bracket, removing those with relatively higher incomes from the eligibility criteria, and reallocating the resulting savings to provide subsidies to the most economically disadvantaged individuals who face a significantly higher risk of homelessness.

While subsidized housing is often intended to reduce homelessness, the implementation of surveillance within subsidized housing has been shown to intensify the effects of poverty. An analysis based upon in-depth interviews with 67 low-income Black mothers living in subsidized housing in Houston, Texas found that property owners and landlords often disproportionately surveil minority tenants. The surveillance that these mothers describe within their residences results in a lack of privacy within the home, increases the likelihood of eviction, and intensifies their financial struggles.

=== Inclusionary zoning ===
The United States government uses various inclusionary zoning regulations to require or incentivize developers to include a certain percentage of affordable housing units in new residential developments. Incentives include density bonuses, tax credits, fee waivers, and deferral programs. Inclusionary zoning policies aim to promote socioeconomic diversity within communities and ensure that affordable housing is integrated into areas with a mix of income levels.

Inclusionary housing policies were initially designed to counteract the impact of "exclusionary zoning" practices that reinforced economic and racial segregation. These inclusionary policies use the private market, often enabling the establishment of new affordable units without heavy reliance on public funding. Because the creation of affordable units under an inclusionary zoning policy hinges on the construction of market-rate housing, it is most effective in areas with active construction or expected new development, where it is likely to generate a substantial number of affordable homes.

One inclusionary zoning program put in place by the United States government to encourage the development and rehabilitation of affordable rental housing is the Low-Income Housing Tax Credit (LIHTC) program. Through this program, developers receive tax credits in exchange for agreeing to rent a portion of their units to low-income tenants at reduced rates. Eligibility for these tax credits necessitates that the proposed development either encompasses new construction or involves substantial refurbishment of residential units. The specific amount of credits a development may obtain depends on the overall depreciable capital improvements and the available funding a state has to cover the entire development cost.

The LIHTC, established in 1986, stands as a groundbreaking departure from the typical structure of supply-side housing programs, which primarily relied on subsidizing low-income housing. As of 2010, this innovative approach yielded the construction of 1.5 million low-income housing units. However, while the LIHTC has expanded to provide the most new affordable housing in the United States, the program has received many criticisms and calls for its elimination.

One such criticism is that the effectiveness of the LIHTC program in providing affordable housing depends on the motivations of various market participants. Currently, major corporations are the primary investors in LIH credits, and their incentives may be influenced not only by the LIHTC program itself but also by related programs, like Community Reinvestment Act (CRA) regulatory obligations.

In terms of benefits of the LIHTC program, a 2011 analysis published in the Housing Policy Debate journal found that increases in the use of tax credits are linked to reductions in racial segregation in metropolitan areas. This means that LIHTC projects do not tend to lead to increased segregation, even in areas with elevated poverty levels.

== Innovative solutions and community initiatives ==
=== Tenant protections ===
Tenant protections are legal measures and regulations designed to safeguard the rights and interests of tenants in the rental housing market. An example of tenant protections is rent regulation, which includes rent control and rent stabilization policies. Both of these protections are used to regulate and limit the amount landlords can increase rent for tenants in certain properties; however, they have distinct origins and guidelines.

Rent control allows landlords to increase rents, with limitations such as an annual increase cap and an upper limit known as the "maximum base rent," adjusted periodically to align with operating costs. Assessing the impact of rent control on its ability to promote stability for individuals residing in rent-controlled units has predominantly shown positive outcomes. Nevertheless, the evidence regarding its effectiveness in promoting economic opportunities or diminishing racial disparities is inconclusive.

Rent stabilization laws restrict rent increases, but they are typically less stringent than rent control. These laws include rights to lease renewal and constraints on annual rent increases, which are recalculated each year. Despite their differences, rent stabilization has become more prevalent than rent control. For example, in New York City in 2021, there were 16,400 rent-controlled apartments compared to 1,048,860 rent-stabilized apartments.

Just cause eviction laws are also tenant protections, given they prevent landlords from evicting tenants without valid reasons, such as non-payment of rent or lease violations. Approximately 44 million households, constituting around one-third of all households in the United States, are renters. Annually, about 2.7 million of these renting households face potential eviction through legal procedures. Data linking eviction court records to the 2006 - 2015 American Community Survey show a significant disparity: despite Black Americans making up an average of 18.6% of all renters, they represent 51.1% of those under threat of eviction and 43.4% of those actually evicted. In contrast, while White Americans comprise over half of all renters at 50.5%, they constitute only 26.3% of those facing eviction and 32.0% of those evicted. Just-Cause Eviction laws are especially crucial in contexts where certain groups, such as Black Americans in this case, face a higher risk of eviction despite being a smaller percentage of the renting population.

=== Mixed-income developments ===
A new apartment building under construction in St. Louis Park, Minnesota, called Via Sol by PLACE (Projects Linking Art, Community and Environment). The development project is a "mixed-use, mixed-income creative community" along the Highway 7 frontage road near the Southwest Light Rail (SWLRT) Wooddale Station, with 217 apartment units, renewable energy sources, and 220 parking spaces.

One innovative solution for housing affordability is mixed-income developments, which are housing projects that include a blend of units at various rent or price levels, designed to create socioeconomically diverse communities. These residences might be mixed within the same hallway, placed in distinct buildings, or situated on separate floors or wings within a single building. Additionally, city blocks or neighborhoods can be deemed mixed-income when they encompass a variety of housing options affordable to individuals spanning various income brackets.

The term "mixed-income" varies across locations, reflecting diverse ratios of affordable and market-rate units along with differing income brackets defining affordability in such developments. Various subsidy programs, such as Low Income Housing Tax Credits and project-based vouchers, are often combined to cater to the needs of lower-income households, dependent on the specific community and housing assistance type.

Allocating more units for higher-income residents in mixed-income spaces has been shown to enhance maintenance and amenities, fostering economic diversity by competing with market-rate developments. However, research challenges the assumption that integrating lower-income and higher-income households significantly strengthens social connections within these developments, indicating limited interaction across income groups and no substantial changes in the economic status of assisted housing families.

== Affordable housing initiatives by city ==
=== San Diego ===
San Diego's housing crisis is largely driven by a shortage of housing units. According to the Housing and Urban Development, total housing costs are affordable if they meet or are below 30% of annual income. According to the American Community Survey of 2016, 54.8% of renters in San Diego pay 30% or over of their income toward rent and housing costs every month. Even with an estimated 84,000 vacant housing units, a significant number of people choose to live outside of county lines, where housing costs are lower. About twenty percent of San Diego workers live outside the county, notably in Riverside County, where median home costs can be as much as $195,400 cheaper. However, where housing costs may be lower, these workers are now facing longer commutes. The combination of housing costs and transport costs means that as many as 45% of the population working in San Diego face poverty.

Homelessness is a huge challenge also stemming from this lack of affordable housing. San Diego's Regional Task Force on the Homeless counted 4,912 homeless individuals in the City of San Diego alone, with 8,576 homeless persons in the San Diego region. Multiple propositions have been made to abate the problem. In 2018, California voted on Proposition 10, which would have lifted state regulations on rent control and allowed local jurisdictions to set their own policies. Proposition 10 did not pass. More recently, in March 2019, the San Diego City Council voted and approved a reform to parking standards on housing units near public transit with the goal of reducing housing costs associated with mandated parking spots and relieve traffic by encouraging residents to use public transit.

==== Initiatives ====
The Department of Housing and Urban Development's Section 8 programs help low income citizens find housing by paying the difference between the market price of a home and 30% of the renter's income. According to the San Diego Housing Commission, Section 8 housing vouchers are the city's largest affordable housing program and were responsible for helping to fill 14,698 homes in the 2014–2015 fiscal year. The San Diego Housing Commission currently owns 2,221 affordable housing units and plans to expand that number in the future to meet the growing demand.

In 2009, the San Diego Housing Commission implemented a finance plan that created 810 more units of affordable rental housing through leveraging the equity of its owned properties. The conversion of city-owned buildings into low-income affordable housing was made possible by an agreement made with the Department of Housing and Urban Development in September 2007. The cost of rent and availability of these units for residents will remain consistent, as the city has put in place provisions to make them affordable for at least 55 years. Additionally, because of a concern that the people who need these housing units might be crowded out, the units are only available to residents with an income cap of 80% of the San Diego median.

In 2017, the new Atmosphere apartment building in downtown San Diego drew attention when it announced that it would be offering 205 apartments to low-income residents. Residents pay their portion of rent through Section 8 vouchers, and many of the apartments are available only to families who make 30% or less of the median income of the city. The new housing project aimed to provide a low-rent area for residents who work downtown but who are unable to live near their workplace because of the high costs.

In 2021, Governor Newsom's $110 billion California Comeback Plan, which included the passing of Senate Bills 8, 9, and 10, was an attempt to help mitigate the current housing crisis. By extending housing production while avoiding displacement of existing tenants and increasing access to zoning for multi-units these bills aim to increase state provisioning and facilitate the development of denser housing. The idea behind the California Comeback Plan is to boost California's housing supply by removing barriers to multi-family units and accessory dwelling units.

=== San Francisco ===
Affordable housing and Homelessness in the San Francisco Bay Area represents an ongoing part of public discourse, especially as the Bay Area population has increased to house about 20% of the State of California's population – the regional population is expected to increase from 7.2 million to 9.3 million by 2040. Major cities including Los Angeles and San Francisco frequently cite increases to the homeless population as a result of reductions in housing supply, while the limitations to affordable housing are also exacerbated by issues of gentrification and redlining, growing residential sprawl within residential communities, and the prevalence of the housing bubble that keeps rent prices consistently high. While local governance bodies such as the Zoning Adjustment Board (ZAB) have worked to introduce reforms to policies such as single-family zoning in an effort to improve housing affordability, the growing homeless population within the Bay Area also points to shortfalls in addressing the intersection of homelessness with issues of mental illness, anti-homeless sentiments and racial discrimination.

=== New York City ===
New York City has a shortage of affordable housing resulting in overcrowding and homelessness. New York City attracts thousands of new residents each year and housing prices continue to climb. Finding affordable housing affects a large portion of the city's population including low-income, moderate-income, and even median income families. Since 1970, income has remained relatively stagnant while rent has nearly doubled for New Yorkers. Consequently, 48.7% of householders spend more than 30% of their income on rent. Several federal and state initiatives have targeted this problem, but have failed to provide enough affordable, inclusive, and sustainable housing for New York City residents. The demand for affordable housing in New York City remains high: 2.5 million applications were submitted for 2,600 available affordable apartments in 2016.

== See also ==
- Triple-decker (house)
- Reefer container housing units
- Studio condo
- 1-over-1
- Tiny-house movement
