= Owner-occupancy =

Status of a person who owns their home

Owner-occupancy or home-ownership is a form of housing tenure in which a person, called the owner-occupier, owner-occupant, or home owner, owns the home in which they live. The home can be a house, such as a single-family house, an apartment, condominium, or a housing cooperative. In addition to providing housing, owner-occupancy also functions as a real estate investment.

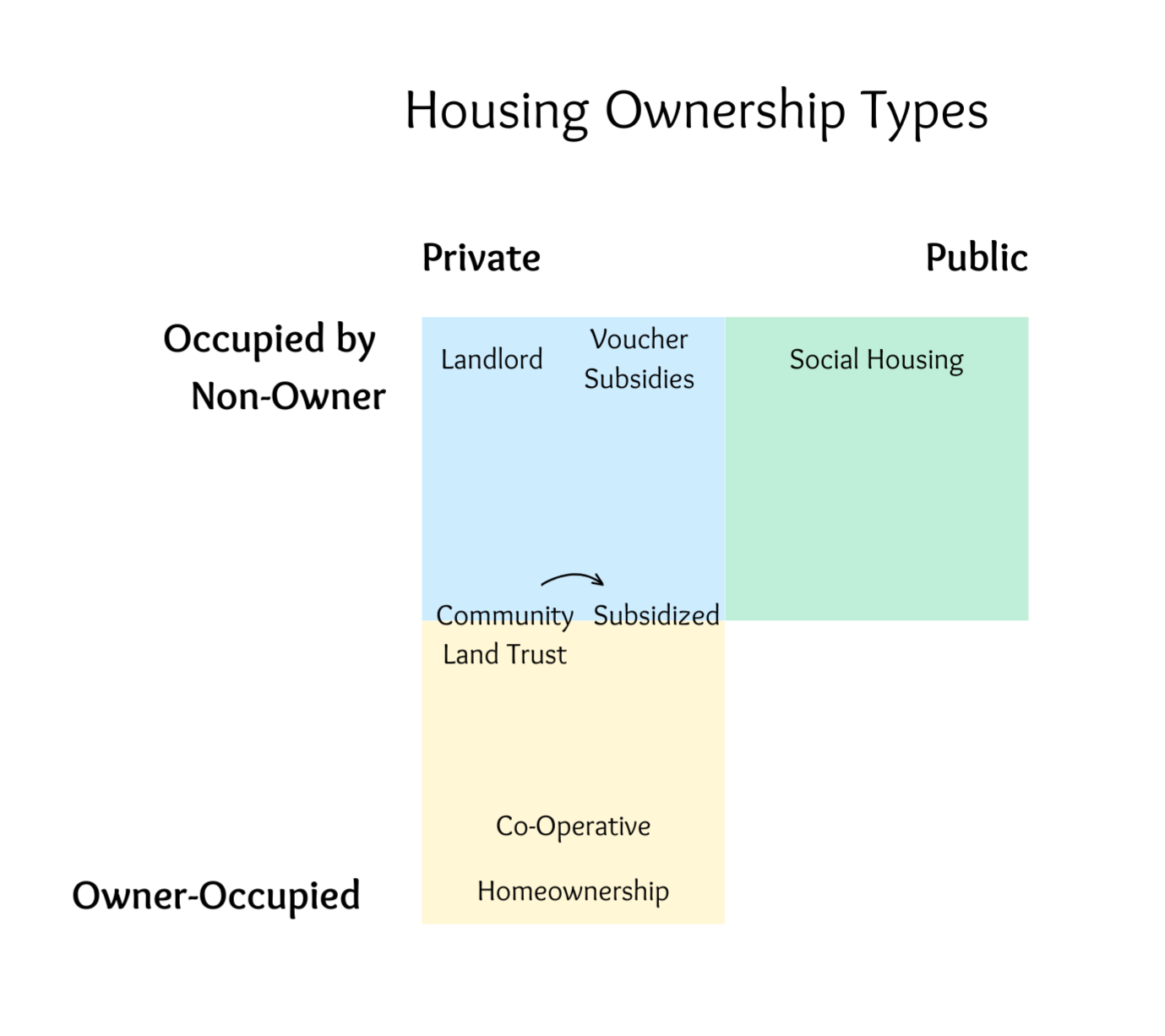
Housing can vary widely in occupant ownership status and public investment.

== Acquisition ==
Some homes are constructed by the owners with the intent to occupy. Many are inherited. A large number are purchased as new homes from a real estate developer or as an existing home from a previous landlord or owner-occupier.

A house is usually the most expensive single purchase an individual or family makes and often costs several times the annual household income. Given the high cost, most individuals do not have enough savings on hand to pay the entire amount outright. In developed countries, mortgage loans are available from financial institutions in return for interest. If the homeowner fails to meet the agreed repayment schedule, a foreclosure (known as a repossession in some countries) may result.

Many countries offer aid to prospective homebuyers to make their purchases. These measures include grants, subsidized mortgages, and mortgage guarantees. Prospective homebuyers may have to meet certain means-tested qualifications to qualify for government aid, such as being a first-time homebuyer or having an income below a certain threshold.

== Pros and cons ==
Perspectives regarding the benefits and risks of owner-occupancy are not universally accepted and depend on individual circumstances and motivations.

Home ownership gives occupants the right to modify the building and land as they please (subject to government, homeowner association, and deed restrictions), protects them from eviction, and creates a right to occupation which can be inherited. Passed-down properties can be rented (as in intentional or accidental landlording) or sold as part of an estate. In some jurisdictions, it also confers certain legal rights with regard to abutters.

Houses and the land they sit on are often expensive, and the combination of monthly mortgage, insurance, maintenance and repairs, and property tax payments are sometimes greater than monthly rental costs. Buildings may also gain and lose substantial value due to real estate market fluctuations, and selling a property can take a long time, depending on market conditions (low market liquidity). This can make home ownership more constraining if the homeowner intends to move at a future date. Some homeowners see their purchase as an investment and intend to sell or to rent the property after renovating or letting the house appreciate in value (known as flipping if done quickly). In 2024, the median American homeowner's net worth was about US$400,000, and the median American renter's net worth was US$10,400.

Renting may be more beneficial than owner-occupancy when the renter requires flexibility in moving to where work opportunities are.

Traditionally, home ownership has been encouraged by governments in Western countries (especially English-speaking countries) because it was one way for people to acquire generational wealth under the commodification of housing, it was believed to encourage savings, and it was thought to promote civic engagement. However, the housing market crash during the 2008 financial crisis in most of the English-speaking world has caused academic and policy-makers to question this logic.

== Political influence ==
Owning a home influences how an individual views the role of government. Data from OECD countries shows that when housing prices rise, individuals are more critical of the welfare state. Conversely, when housing prices drop, homeowners are more likely to favor government intervention. In the US, areas with high rates of homeownership have higher levels of voter turnout. There is also a weak relationship between homeownership and supporting Republican candidates. Data from the UK supports the idea that homeowners view the value of their home as a kind of private, informal insurance policy against economic shocks. A sufficiently valuable home protects the owner without need for government intervention.

Architect José Luis de Arrese, the Falangist and national syndicalist minister of housing in Francoist Spain from 1956 to 1960, explicitly called for "a Spain of home owners" rather than "proletarians". By 1991, 82% of the Spanish population owned their own house (86% by 2000), with no significant relationship with social class.

Homeowners are usually required to pay property tax (or millage tax) periodically. The tax is levied by the governing authority of the jurisdiction in which the property is located; it may be paid to a national government, a federated state, a county or geographical region, or a municipality. Multiple jurisdictions may tax the same property. In most Canadian provinces home purchasers must pay a one-time tax called a Property Transfer Tax (Land Transfer Tax) which is based on the cost of the home.

== International statistics ==
The home ownership rate is the ratio of owner-occupied units to total residential units in a specified area.

The median age of US homebuyers has increased in recent decades, for both first-time buyers and repeat buyers.

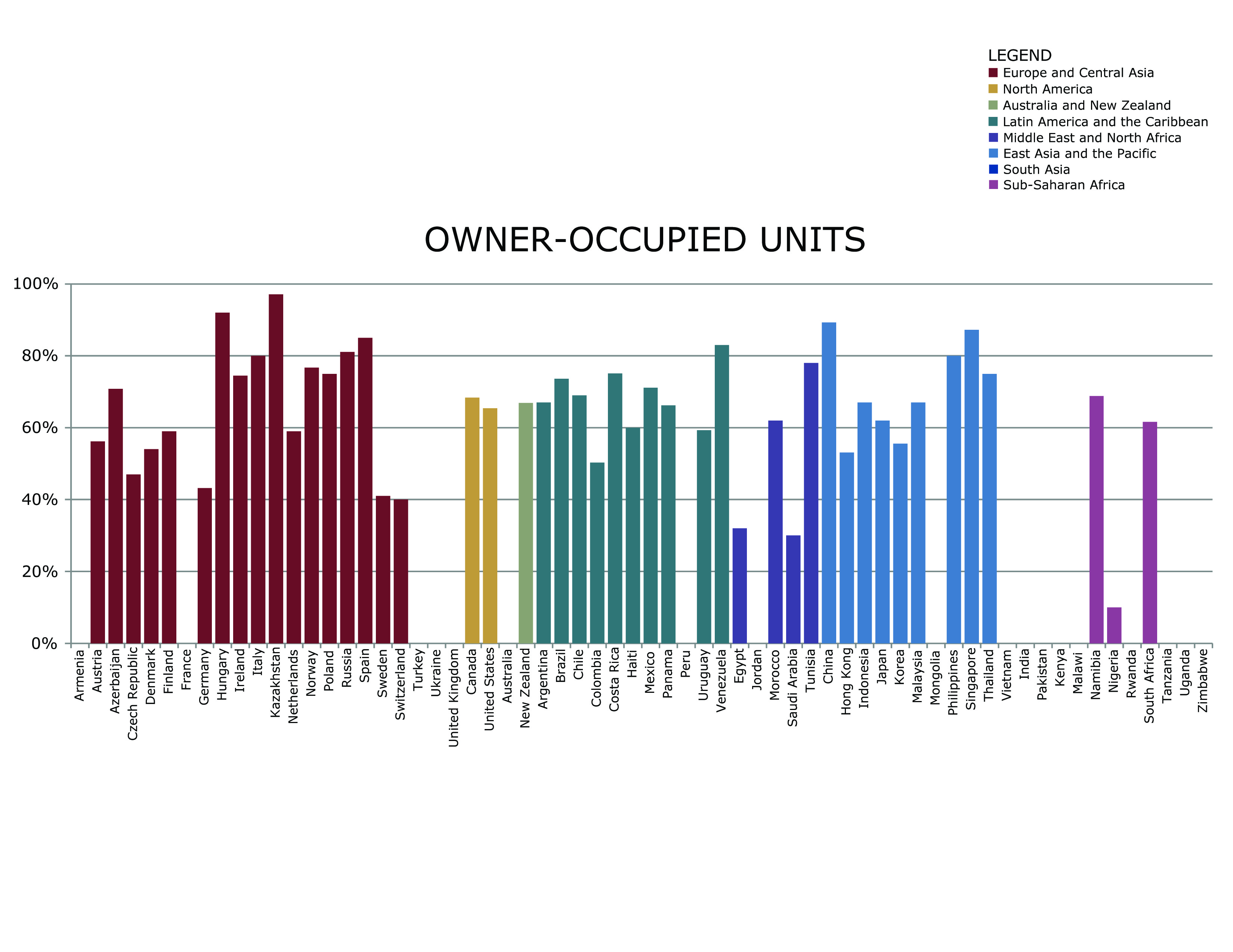
Percentage of owner-occupied units in urban areas, by country

Country	% Owner-Occupied Units in Urban Areas	Urban Population, % of Total	Home ownership rate	
Country	% Owner-Occupied Units in Urban Areas	Urban Population, % of Total	%	Year
Albania	—	—	95.3	2023
Argentina	67%	92%	68.9	2017
Armenia	96%	64%	—	—
Australia	68%	89%	66.3	2020
Austria	—	—	54.3	2023
Azerbaijan	71%	52%	—	—
Belgium	—	—	71.9	2023
Bosnia and Herzegovina	—	—	91.2	2007
Brazil	74%	87%	70.8	2022
Brunei	—	—	65.0	2019
Bulgaria	87%	73%	86.1	2023
Canada	68%	81%	66.5	2021
Chile	69%	89%	—	—
China	89%	45%	96.0	2022
Colombia	50%	75%	—	—
Costa Rica	75%	94%	—	—
Croatia	—	—	91.2	2023
Cuba	—	—	90.0	2014
Cyprus	—	—	68.8	2023
Czech Republic	47%	74%	76.0	2023
Denmark	54%	87%	60.0	2023
East Timor	—	—	49.9	2007
Egypt	37%	43%	76.0	2019
Estonia	—	—	80.7	2023
European Union	—	—	69.2	2023
Finland	—	—	69.2	2023
France	47%	78%	63.1	2023
Germany	43%	74%	47.6	2023
Greece	—	—	69.6	2023
Haiti	60%	48%	—	—
Hong Kong	53%	100%	50.4	2023
Hungary	93%	68%	90.5	2023
Iceland	—	—	75.0	2021
India	87%	30%	86.6	2011
Indonesia	67%	54%	84.0	2019
Iran	—	—	60.5	2017
Ireland	—	—	69.4	2023
Israel	—	—	64.6	2019
Italy	80%	68%	75.9	2024
Japan	—	—	55.0	2021
Kazakhstan	96%	—	98.0	2024
Kenya	—	22%	75.0	2019
Laos	—	—	95.9	2015
Latvia	—	—	82.8	2023
Lithuania	—	—	88.8	2023
Luxembourg	—	—	67.6	2023
Malawi	—	19%	—	—
Malaysia	—	72%	76.9	2019
Malta	—	—	74.7	2023
Mexico	71%	78%	80.0	2009
Mongolia	—	58%	—	—
Montenegro	—	—	91.0	2023
Morocco	62%	57%	—	—
Myanmar	—	—	85.5	2014
Namibia	69%	35%	—	—
Nepal	—	—	86.0	2021
Netherlands	59%	83%	70.2	2023
New Zealand	67%	87%	64.5	2018
Nigeria	10%	50%	25.0	2019
North Macedonia	—	—	85.8	2023
Norway	77%	78%	79.2	2023
Oman	—	—	83.0	2014
Pakistan	—	38%	82.0	2023
Panama	66%	75%	—	—
Peru	—	72%	—	—
Philippines	80%	66%	—	—
Poland	78%	61%	87.3	2023
Portugal	—	—	76.0	2023
Romania	97%	54%	95.6	2023
Russia	81%	73%	—	—
Rwanda	—	19%	—	—
Saudi Arabia	—	—	62.1	2019
Senegal	—	43%	—	—
Serbia	—	—	91.6	2023
Singapore	87%	100%	87.9	2020
Slovakia	—	—	93.6	2023
Slovenia	—	—	75.2	2023
South Africa	62%	62%	69.7	2021
South Korea	56%	82%	57.3	2021
Spain	85%	77%	75.3	2023
Sri Lanka	82%	15%	—	—
Sweden	41%	85%	64.9	2023
Switzerland	40%	74%	42.3	2023
Taiwan	—	—	83.9	2010
Tanzania	—	26%	—	—
Thailand	75%	34%	74.0	2021
Trinidad and Tobago	—	—	76.0	2013
Tunisia	78%	67%	—	—
Turkey	81%	70%	56.7	2023
Uganda	—	13%	—	—
Ukraine	—	68%	—	—
United Arab Emirates	—	—	28.0	2017
United Kingdom	50%	90%	65.2	2023
United States	65%	82%	65.7	2024
Uruguay	59%	93%	—	—
Venezuela	83%	94%	—	—
Vietnam	79.8%	38.6%	89.7%	2024
Zimbabwe	—	38%	—	—

== See also ==
- Home ownership in Australia
- Homeownership in Germany
- Homeownership in the United States
- Imputed rent
- Negative equity
- Ownership
- Property
