= Housing insecurity in the United States =

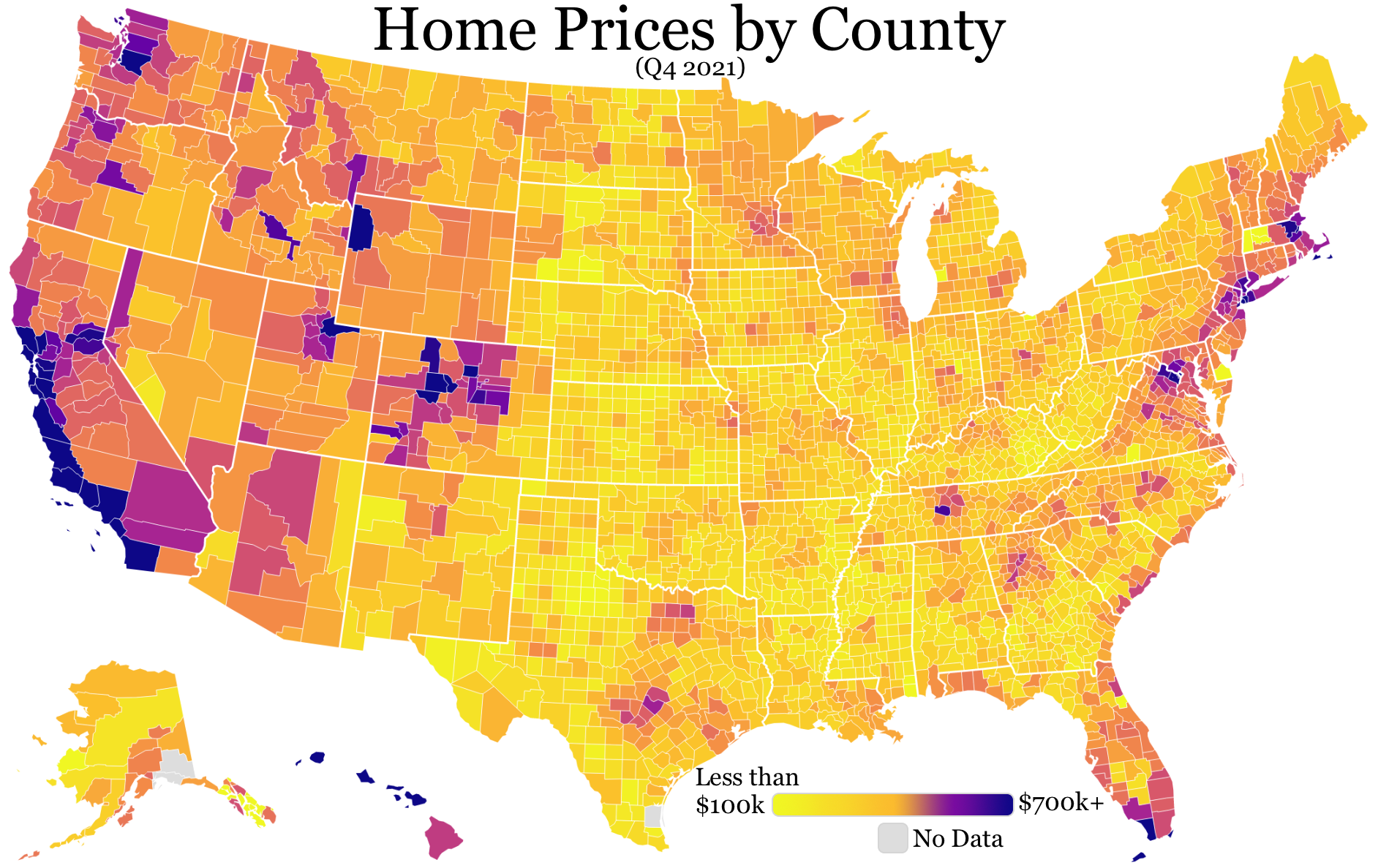
Home prices by county (2021): <$100,000; $200,000; $300,000; $400,000; $500,000; $600,000; $700,000+

Median cost of rent for a 1 bedroom by County

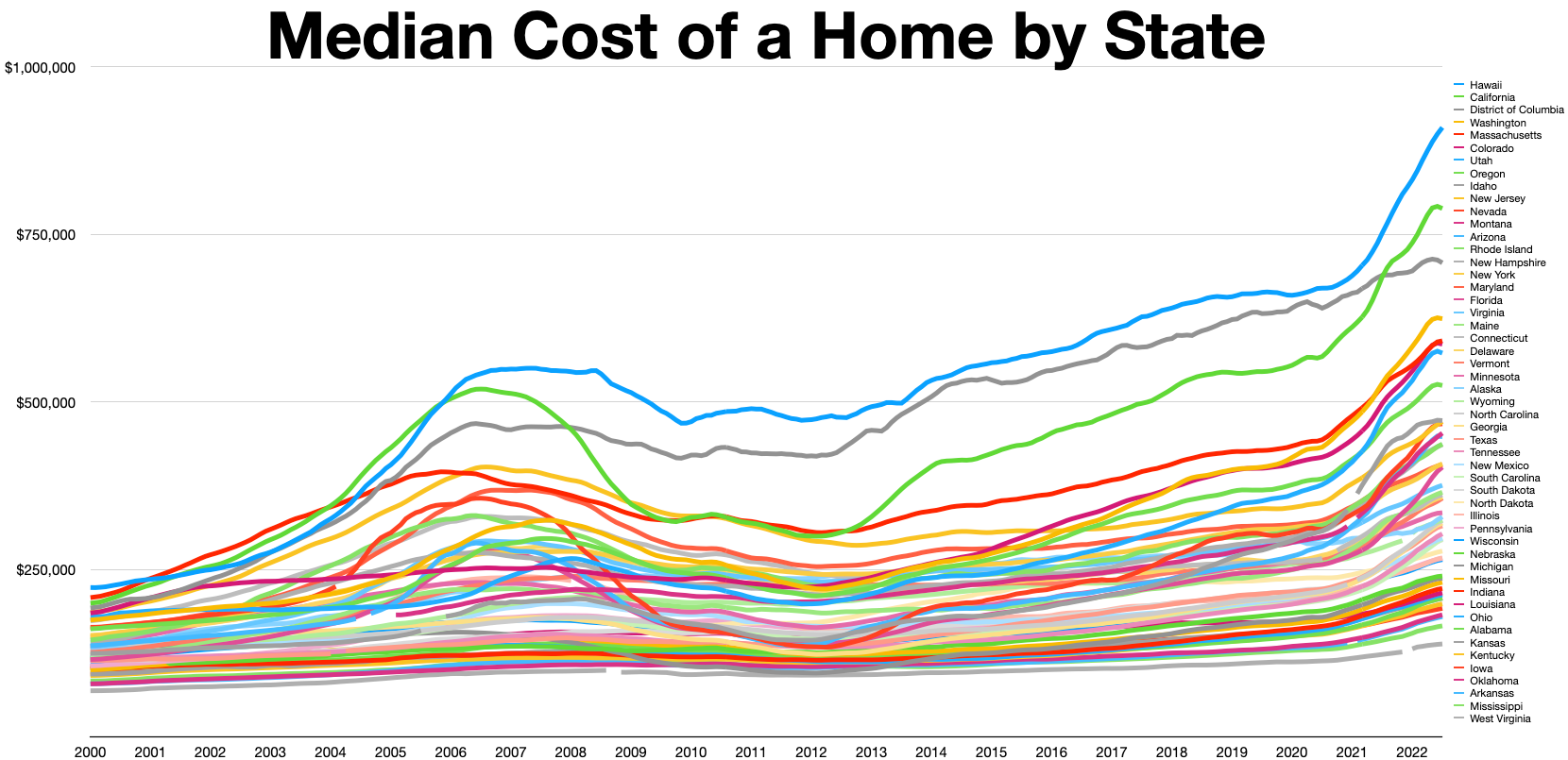
Cost of housing by state (2000-2022)

Housing insecurity is the lack of security in an individual shelter that is the result of high housing costs relative to income and is associated with poor housing quality, unstable neighborhoods, overcrowding, and homelessness.

Housing shortages are a primary cause of high housing prices and rents. Climate change has also increased average housing costs with higher insurance premiums and power bills while also increasing displacement risks, especially in coastal areas.

== Measuring housing insecurity ==
Researchers from the University of Southern California proposed measuring housing insecurity through the following indicators: housing instability, housing affordability, housing safety, housing quality, neighborhood safety, neighborhood quality, and homelessness.

The Department of Health and Human Services has defined housing insecurity by taking into account proportion to income, housing quality, neighborhoods, overcrowding, and homelessness.

The Center for Disease Control used the frequency of responses to the question of, "How often in the past 12 months would you say you were worried or stressed about having enough money to pay your rent/mortgage? Sometimes, usually, or always?", to identify those who are housing insecure and to assist in their research on disease prevention.

The Department of Housing and Urban Development defines housing insecurity based on multiple factors in the unit based on the quality of the house. Based on answers on the American Housing Survey, they deem people housing insecure and the house inadequate based on these structural conditions:

- "does not have hot and cold running water"
- "does not have a bathtub or shower"
- "does not have a flush toilet"
- "shares plumbing facilities"
- "unit was cold for 24 hours or more and more than two breakdowns of the heating equipment have occurred that lasted longer than 6 hours"
- "electricity is not used"
- "has exposed wiring, not every room has working electrical plugs, and the fuses have blown more than twice."
- "has had outside water leaks in the past 12 months"
- "has had inside water leaks in the past 12 months"
- "has holes in the floor"
- "has open cracks wider than a dime"
- "has an area of peeling paint larger than 8 by 11 inches"
- "rats have been seen recently in the unit."

=== Housing affordability ===
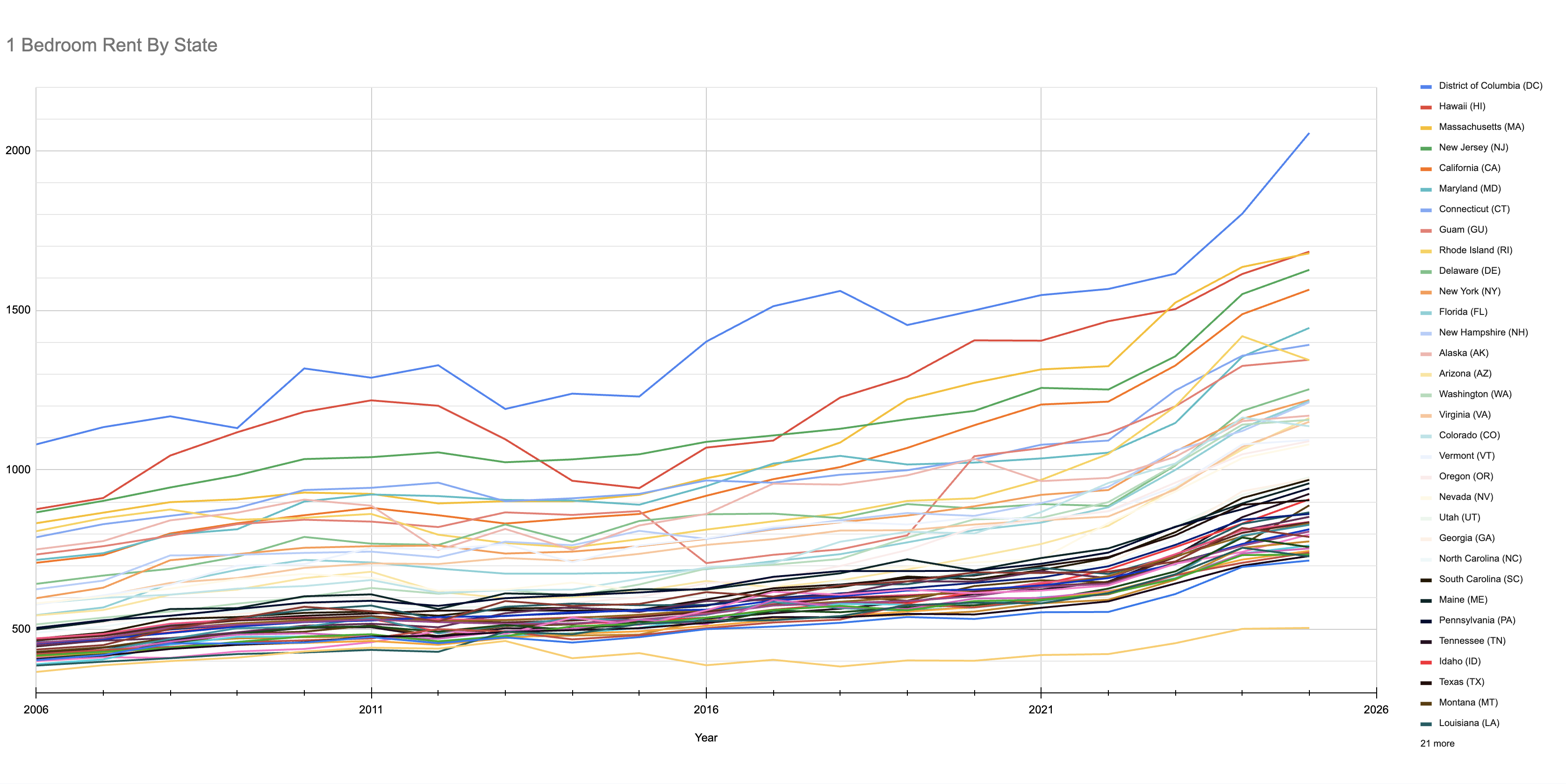
1 bedroom rent by year by state (2006-2025)

Housing affordability is defined as the ratio of annualized housing costs to annual income. Different income based measures use different thresholds; however most organizations use either the 30% or 50% threshold, meaning that an individual is housing insecure if they spend more than 30% or 50% of their annual income on housing.

The median rent increased from $483 in 2000 to $1,216 in 2021; more than doubled in the past two decades. According to Zillow data, the average U.S. home was worth about $230,000 at the start of 2020. In May 2023 it has reached over $330,000. As housing expenses rose in 2021, households with incomes under $30,000 had little money left over after paying for utilities and rent - only approximately $380 per month, down from nearly $600 two decades earlier. Prices continued to rise although more slowly through 2024 due to tight supply.

In 2023, more than 21 million renter households, or 49.7% of the 42.5 million renter households for which the measure could be calculated, spent more than 30% of household income on housing costs. The median share of income spent on housing by renters was 31%.

=== Housing safety ===
Housing safety is defined as a housing issue that presents an imminent health threat, such as inadequate heating capacity, faulty foundation, evidence of rodents, exposed electrical and more. Housing quality is defined as housing that is substandard but does not pose an imminent health risk, such as no cooking unit, no hot/cold water, no drinking water, faulty sewage, and more.

=== Neighborhood safety ===
Neighborhood safety is defined as living in a neighborhood that presents imminent health threats, such as a factory is located within half a block, unit is in a flood plain, unsatisfactory police presence, and more. Neighborhood quality is defined as households in neighborhoods with undesirable characteristics that do not pose an imminent health risk, such as poor city/county services, unit is boarded up, roads need repairs, no stores within fifteen minutes, and more. Homelessness in the United States is defined as "households who define housing type at the time of interviews as either tent, cave, railroad car, unspecified housing unit, a boat, an RV, or an unoccupied site for a mobile home, trailer or tent." If an individual meets one of the above criteria, then they are considered housing insecure under this definition.

=== Adequate housing ===
The United Nations Universal Declaration of Human Rights, of which the United States is a signee, includes the right to adequate housing. They define adequate housing as having security of tenure, availability of services, materials, facilities and infrastructure, affordability, habitability, accessibility, location, and cultural adequacy. Many of these tenants are similar to the ones above, such as availability of services (neighborhood quality), affordability, habitability (housing quality and housing safety), and location (neighborhood safety and neighborhood quality).

=== Additional terms ===
The UN defines security of tenure as having tenure security which guarantees legal protection against forced evictions, harassment, and other threats. They define accessibility as taking into account the specific needs of disadvantaged and marginalized groups. They define cultural adequacy as respecting and taking into account the expression of cultural identity. If housing does not meet any of these criteria, it is considerate inadequate, or housing insecure.

== Rates ==
The various forms of housing insecurity have been studied in order to find which life circumstances lead families to housing insecurity. Associations between unreliable housing and factors such as race, income, and family type are especially clear. Housing insecure households are likely to consist of unmarried people. 57% of housing insecure households are made up of unmarried individuals that do not have children.

The second largest category is unmarried households with children, which makes up 21% of the distribution. 63% of housing insecure households are extremely low income, which means their annual income is less than the Federal Poverty Level or 30% of the Area Median Income. Most people facing housing insecurity are not seniors and are renters. A lack of education has an especially evident association with housing insecurity. Within housing insecure households, 18% of individuals have a bachelor's or graduate degree, while 50% have no college experience. 55% of housing insecure households are white.

Rates of housing insecurity are fairly consistent across the United States. For the majority of states, between 10% and 15% of households are housing insecure. Wyoming has the least housing insecurity while California and New York have the most housing insecurity; 20% of households face housing insecurity.

In regards to rates of housing inadequacy defined by the American Housing Survey, the number of housing units that were considered extremely inadequate fluctuated between 2005 and 2009. There were 2,021,050 extremely inadequate units that were occupied in 2005, 1,805,960 extremely inadequate units that were occupied in 2007, and 1,863,660 extremely inadequate units that were occupied in 2009. The average number of extremely inadequate units for these three years, 1,896,890 units, amounts to less than 2% of the total number of housing units in the United States. The characteristics that most frequently made units deemed extremely inadequate were shared plumbing facilities (55%) and unacceptably long cold periods (29%). 91.6% of extremely inadequate units experienced only one of the listed qualities of an extremely inadequate unit.

== Risk factors ==
=== Race/ethnicity ===
Those who experience housing insecurity are found to be majorly composed of minority groups such as African Americans and Hispanics, who are twice more likely than whites to experience housing insecurity. Due to their lack of jobs and opportunities, these populations were unable to afford housing even without agreements and restrictions. Around the 1800s, they experienced overcrowding "into tenement housing lacking sanitation, fire safety, and adequate light and ventilation" which using the multiple definitions defined, this is considered housing insecurity.

=== Gender ===
Gender contributes to housing insecurity, with more women facing insecurity than men. One sociologist argues that "female-headed households are systematically disadvantaged by a vast network of intersecting sexist, racist, and classist inequalities and institutional practices and policies (e.g., unequal and low pay, unpaid caregiving, lack of affordable housing, discrimination, a weak safety net, punitive welfare and public housing policies) that contribute to homelessness". This marked rise in the homelessness of women and children constitutes what is referred to as the "feminization of homelessness". This term signifies how the balance has shifted unfavorably in recent years with respect to the disproportionate impact on women and children of systemic factors leading to homelessness. The U.S. Interagency Council on Homelessness reported that 75 percent of unhoused adults who were members of families with children were women––out of this 75 percent, people of color comprised the majority. Intimate partner violence (IPV) is a major contributor. Women experiencing IPV face greater financial insecurity, eviction, and coerced substance misuse. Additionally, shortcomings in the service of legal and advocacy systems for IPV survivors play a part in reinforcing the status quo of power dynamics in relation to gender. This is a phenomenon that continues to occur due to "interpersonal acts" that often happen in the context of the patriarchal system at large. This can hinder women's ability to achieve financial stability and housing security, while at the same time failing to hold men accountable. Another sociologist postulated that the U.S. social-welfare system could be considered as bifurcated into unequal subsystems wherein there is a masculine "social insurance subsystem tied to 'primary' labor force participation and geared to (white male) 'breadwinners'" that is more advantageous than the feminine "relief subsystem tied to household income and geared to homemaker-mothers and their 'defective' (i.e., female-headed) families". Women who are homeless struggle to break out of the cycle of homelessness. More broadly, members of the LGBTQ community are also a group that faces unequal risk factors associated with housing insecurity. Many unhoused LGBTQ folks are young adults who have been "asked to leave from their previous living arrangement" due to their identities not being viewed as acceptable.

=== Coastal communities ===
Coastal communities have, on average, higher displacement risks from sea-level rise, hurricanes and other related weather events.

== Impacts ==
Housing insecurity in the United States has many impacts for the housing insecure. Through cross-sectional analyses, researchers in the 2010s have found several negative factors; yet they acknowledge that it is not currently possible to pinpoint the exact causes and effects. The absence of a valid measure or universal definition for housing insecurity may be a possible reason for lack of research. Despite these implications with research, findings across the board suggest housing insecurity is a negative risk factor when it pertains to health and educational attainment.

=== Health ===
In a study that analyzed data from the 2011 Washington State Behavior Risk Factor Surveillance System, 29.4% of the 8,416 respondents reported being housing insecure. Housing insecure respondents were approximately "twice as likely to report poor or fair health status" compared to those who did not report being housing insecure. Approximately one third of the housing insecure respondents reported delaying doctor visits due to the costs. 26.9% of the housing insecure respondents were current smokers and "26.3% had poor or fair health".

Through an additional cross-sectional analysis from the 2002 National Survey of America's Families, "housing instability was independently associated with postponed medical care, postponed medications, and increased emergency department visits". Other health outcomes that have been associated with housing insecurity by past studies include: probable GAD, depression, and PTSD.

=== Education ===
A longitudinal study assessed the academic achievements of children suggesting there is a link between housing insecurity and performance in school. Researchers reported that homeless and highly mobil children were more likely to be at risk for low academic achievement compared to other students.

Some scholars conclude the aforementioned achievement gaps with homeless and highly mobile students tend to be chronic and "may worsen among older grade cohorts." Highly mobile students were also linked with having "increased rates of grade retention" and more "school-related problems such as expulsion or suspension", compared to other students.

== Assistance ==
One source of assistance is locally located public housing agencies (PHAs) that distribute section 8 vouchers. The vouchers are funded by the U.S. government, specifically the U.S. Department of Housing and Urban Development. These vouchers help low income families or individuals pay for their rent. The PHA determines eligibility based on income, family size and citizenship. Most families that qualify are put on a waitlist, and once they get a voucher, they must be able to find their own housing, and it must meet the safety requirements of the PHA. Once the family meets all the standards, the PHA may partially pay the landlord for the family's rent, requiring the family to pay the difference, or depending on the situation, the PHA may pay for a reasonably priced home.

The National Low Income Housing Coalition (NLIHC) aims to create housing stability in the U.S. by increasing affordable housing and supporting government funded homes. The organization consists of 5 teams: the Research Team, the Policy Team, the Field Team, the Communications Team, and the Administration Team. The Research Team looks at statistics of housing insecurity, and the Policy Team helps inform policy makers about these trends. The Field Team raises awareness and the Communications Team gathers input from the general population about their views of housing insecurity. Finally, the Administration Team oversees the organization and regulates progress. These 5 groups all come together to combat housing insecurity.

Enterprise is another organization that has a plan to end housing insecurity by 2020. Their goal is not only to provide for low income families, but to also improve their psychological and physical well-being. They have 5 pillars that they focus on: homes, systems, connections, resources, and foundation. Their objective is to provide affordable housing with systems that will provide equal opportunity for low income families. Enterprise also looks for opportunities to expand resources in the government to help those in need. Enterprise's 5 pillars come together to shape their main goal of becoming the foundation that will be strong enough to end housing insecurity.

== Solutions ==
=== Starter homes ===
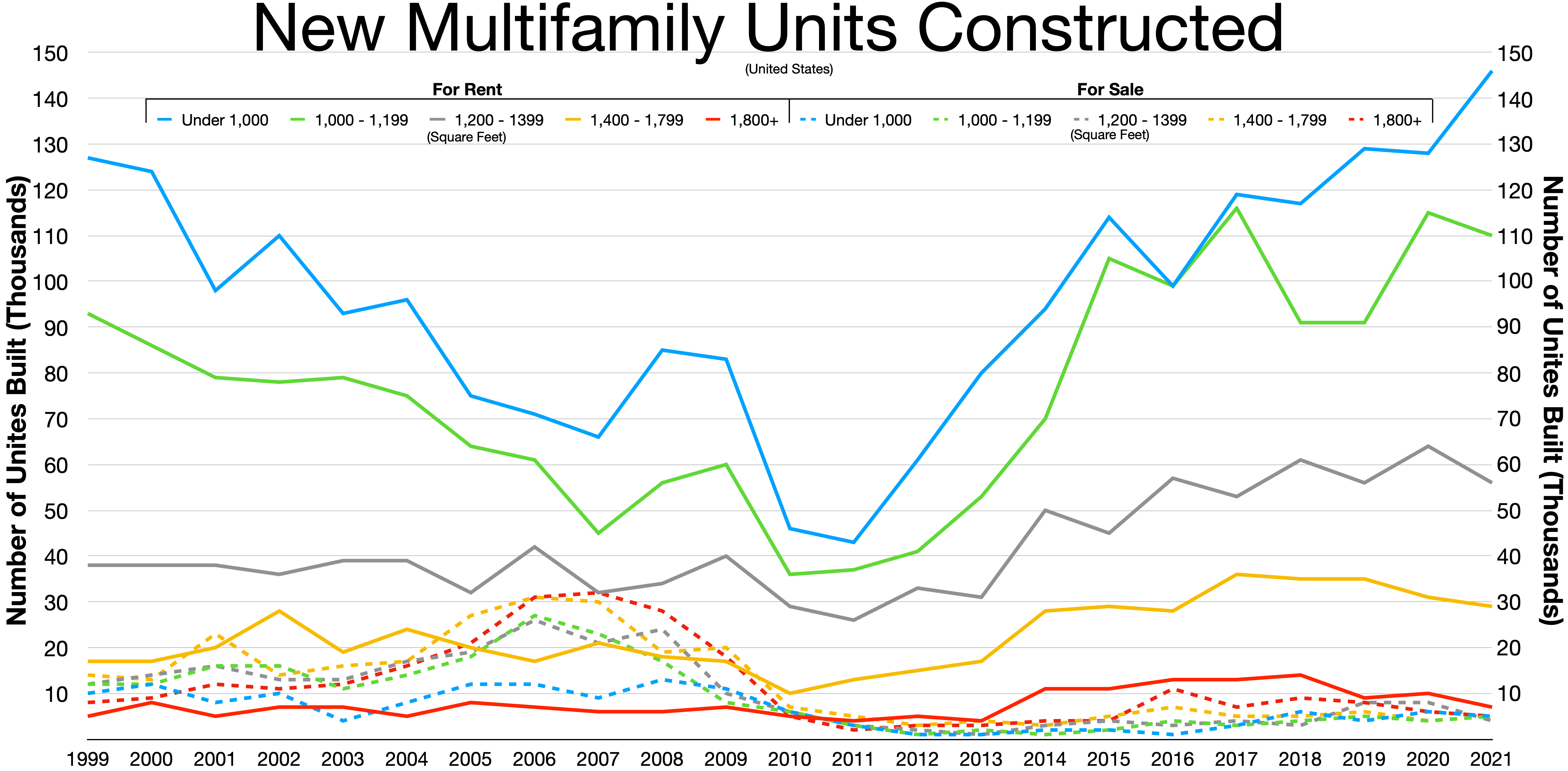
New Multifamily Units Constructed For Rent: Under 1,000 ft^{2}; 1,000 - 1,199 ft^{2}; 1,200 - 1,399 ft^{2}; 1,400 - 1,799 ft^{2}; 1,800+ ft^{2}; For Sale: Under 1,000 ft^{2}; 1,000 - 1,199 ft^{2}; 1,200 - 1,399 ft^{2}; 1,400 - 1,799 ft^{2}; 1,800+ ft^{2}

Only 8% of new single family homes built in 2021 were 1,400 ft^{2} or less and in the 1940s 70% of new housing built was under 1,400 ft^{2}. Local governments regulate out entry level housing with square foot requirements, zoning ordinances, and permits. Condominiums of 500-1,000ft^{2} that can be owned instead of leased, which could be a studio, 1 bedroom, or 2 bedroom with a reasonable HOA monthly fee and property taxes would be less expensive than renting in the longer run and a way to start building wealth starting out.

== See also ==
- Eviction in the United States
- Homeownership in the United States
- Homelessness in the United States
