= Homeownership in the United States =

Percentage of homes owned by their occupants

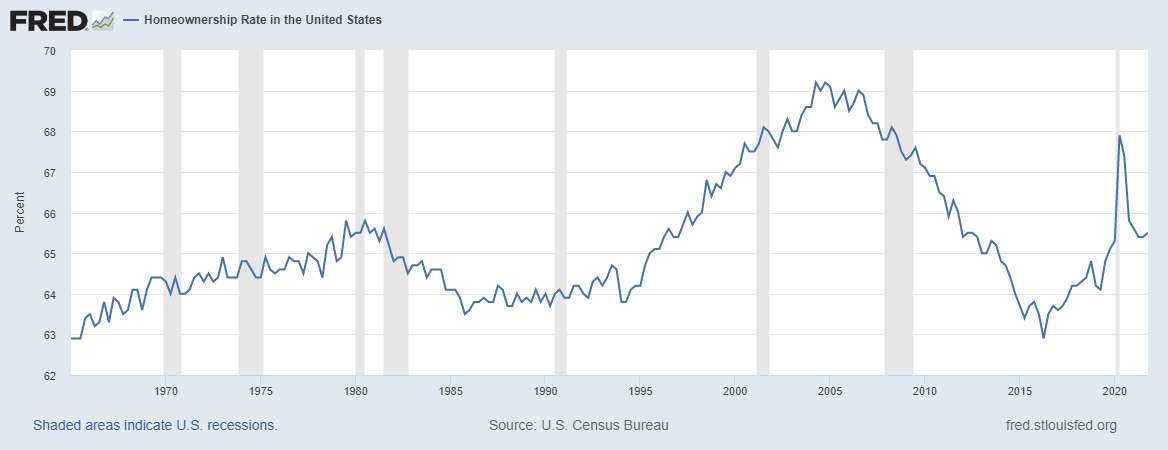
Homeownership rate (quarterly)

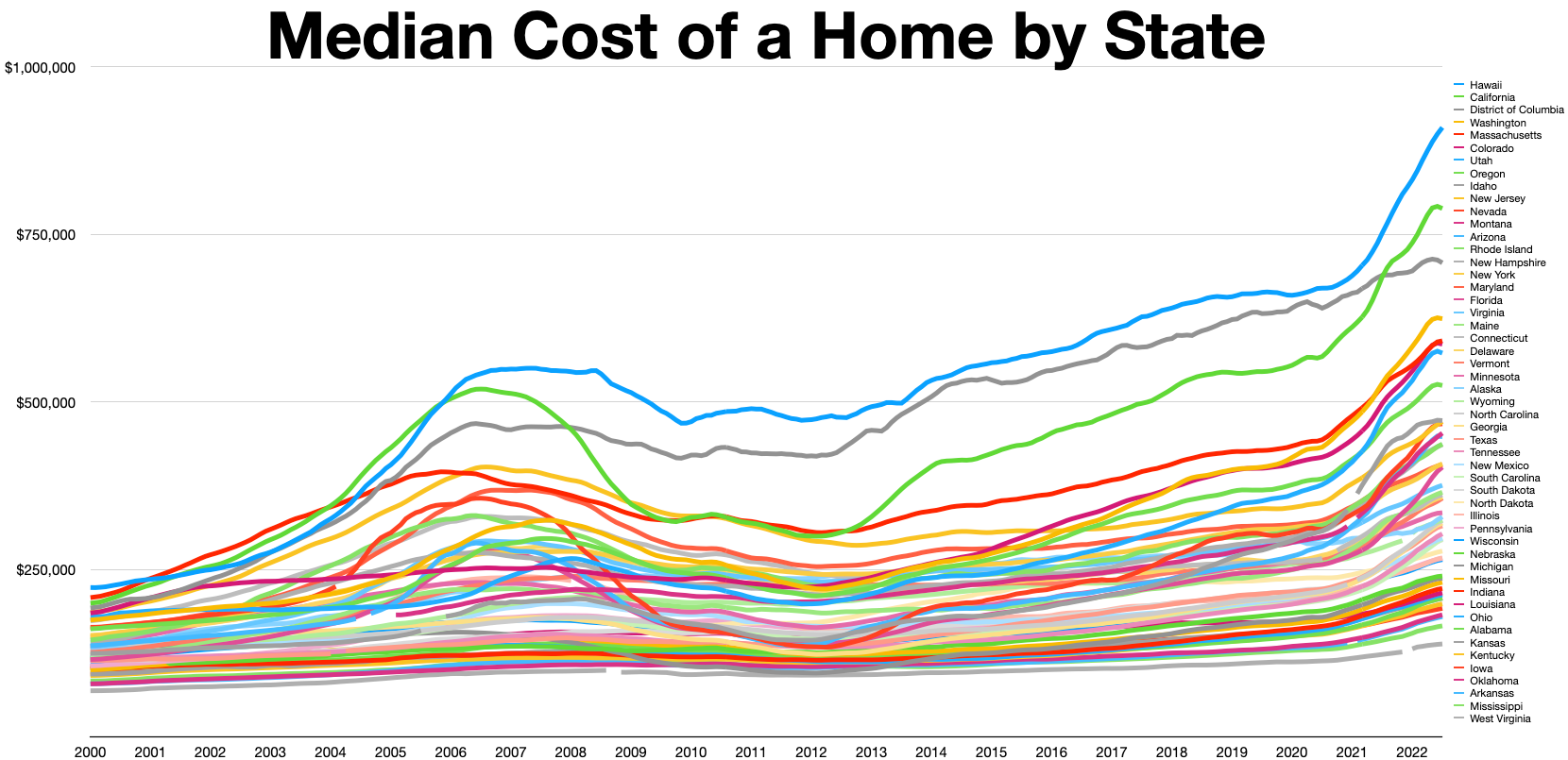
Cost of housing by State

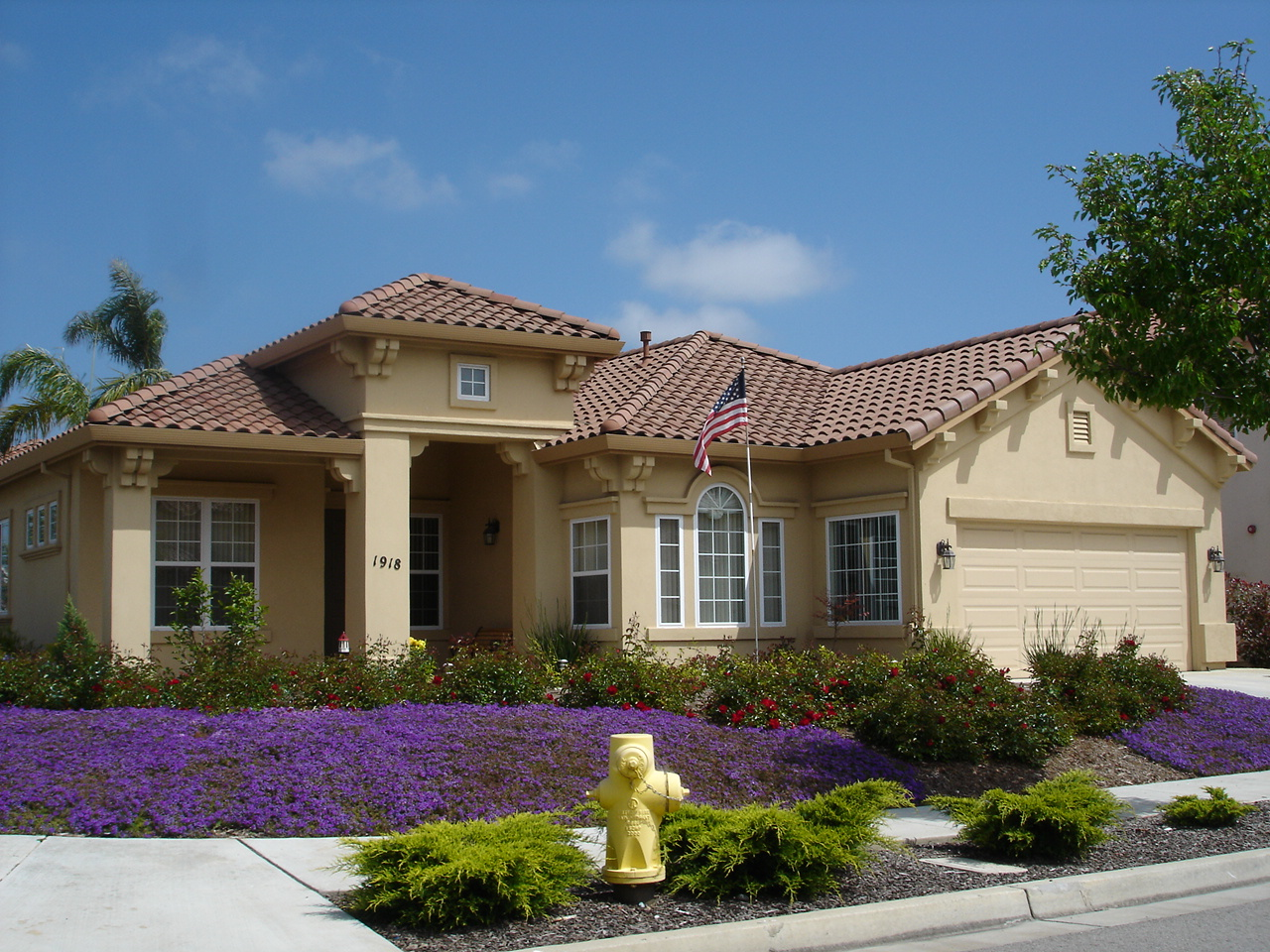
A single-family home in Salinas, California

The homeownership rate in the United States is the percentage of households that are owner-occupied. U.S. homeownership rates vary depending on a household's demographic characteristics, such as ethnicity, race, location, type of household, and type of settlement. In the second quarter of 2026, the seasonally adjusted U.S. homeownership rate was 65.2 percent; it was not statistically different from the rates in either the second quarter of 2025 or the first quarter of 2026. By comparison, the European Union homeownership rate stood at 69% as of 2022.

In recent decades, the U.S. homeownership rate has remained relatively stable—it was at 62.1% in 1960. However, homeowner equity has fallen steadily since World War II. In 2008, homeowner equity was measured at an average of less than 50% of the value of the home. The annual U.S. Census Bureau statistics have historically shown that homeownership is most common in rural areas and suburbs, with three quarters of suburban households being homeowners. On an unadjusted basis, the Midwest had the highest homeownership rate in the second quarter of 2026 at 69.0 percent, followed by the South at 66.9 percent, the Northeast at 61.6 percent, and the West at 60.5 percent; none of the four regional rates was statistically different from the second quarter of 2025. The Federal Reserve Bank of Chicago examined the decline in homeownership rates where the "head of household" was 25 to 44 years of age. These rates fell substantially between 1980 and 2000, and recovered only partially during the U.S. housing bubble of the early 2000s. Research indicated that post-1980 trends toward (a) marrying later, and (b) greater instability in household earnings, accounted for a large share of the decline in young homeownership.

U.S. homeowners tend to have higher-than-average incomes. Owner-occupied households were more likely to be families (as opposed to individuals) than were their tenant counterparts. Among racial demographics, White Americans had the country's highest homeownership rate, while African Americans had the lowest rate. One study shows that homeownership rates correlated with higher educational attainment.

The term "homeownership rate" can be misleading. As defined by the U.S. Census Bureau, it is the percentage of homes that are occupied by the owner. It is not the percentage of adults that own their home. This latter percentage will be significantly lower than the homeownership rate. Many owner-occupied households contain adult relatives (often young adults, descendants of the owner) who do not own a home. Single building multi-bedroom rental units can house more than one adult, all of whom do not own a home. The term can also be misleading because it includes households that owe on a mortgage, which means they do not possess full equity in the home they are said to "own". According to ATTOM Data Research, only "34 percent of all American homeowners have 100 percent equity in their properties – they’ve either paid off their entire mortgage debt or they never had a mortgage".

In 2017, CNBC reported that the median sale price for a U.S. home was US$199,200. In early 2025, Statista forecast that the median sale price would jump to US$426,000 by 2nd quarter 2026. The growing U.S. housing shortage is a major factor in home prices increasing so rapidly.

In 2025, first-time buyers made up just 21% of U.S. homebuyers, the lowest share on record, while the median age of first-time buyers rose to 40, according to the National Association of Realtors.

== Measuring method ==
In the United States, the homeownership rate is created through the Housing Vacancy Survey by the U.S. Census Bureau. It is created by dividing the owner occupied units by the total number of occupied units. This is an important point to understand changes in the homeownership rate over time. The bust of the housing bubble resulted in many houses becoming foreclosed. However, the decrease in the homeownership rate from 3Q2007 to 4Q2007 was mostly a result of an increase in the renter's population and less due to a decrease in the homeowner population.

== Government policy ==
Homeownership has been promoted as government policy using several means involving mortgage debt and the government sponsored entities Freddie Mac, Fannie Mae, and the Federal Home Loan Banks, which fund or guarantee $6.5 trillion of assets with the purpose of directly or indirectly promoting homeownership. Homeownership has been further promoted through tax policy which allows a tax deduction for mortgage interest payments on a primary residence. The Community Reinvestment Act also encourages homeownership for low-income earners. The promotion of homeownership by the government through encouraging mortgage borrowing and lending has given rise to debates regarding government policies and the subprime mortgage crisis.

== Race ==
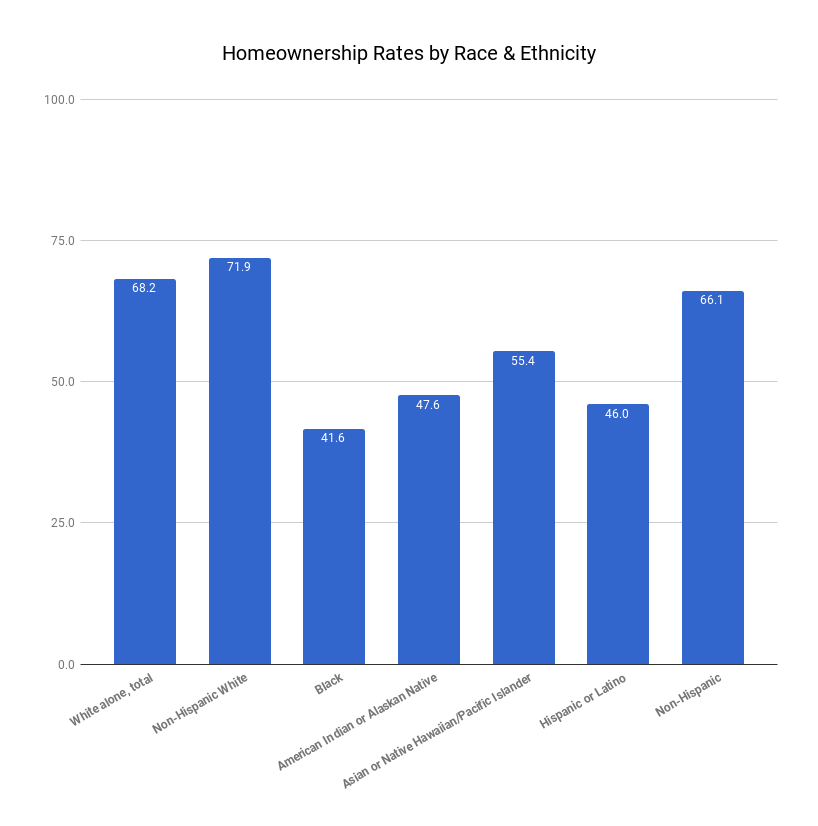
Homeownership rate according to race & ethnicity in 2016

The homeownership rate, as well as its change over time, has varied significantly by race. While homeowners constitute the majority of White, Asian and Native American households, the homeownership rates for African Americans and Latinos have typically fallen short of the fifty percent threshold. Whites have had the highest homeownership rate, followed by Asians and Native Americans.

Although a landmark United States Supreme Court ruling Shelley v. Kraemer 334 U.S. 1 (1948), (Note: Works related to Shelley v. Kraemer at Wikisource; Text of Shelley v. Kraemer, 334 U.S. 1 (1948) is available from: CourtListener Internet Archive (docket files) Justia Library of Congress Oyez (oral argument audio) WorldLII) ruled invalid exclusionary racial covenants, which almost always barred black citizens from owning a home but often extended to American Jews, Asian Americans, Mexican Americans, and non-citizens and other ethnic groups and could be used by white real estate owners to enforce or introduce racial segregation, threats of legal action allowed them to remain effective for some time afterwards. Racial steering practices later on also affected patterns of homeownership among non-whites and the cumulative effects of exclusionary covenants, racial steering, and other segregation measures have resulted in lower property values, less capital accumulation, lower municipal tax revenues, and disinvestment in black communities. Despite the fact that the Shelley v. Kraemer decision found exclusionary covenants to be unconstitutional under the Fourteenth Amendment to the United States Constitution's Equal Protection Clause 78 years ago, and hence unenforceable, the clauses are still present in many deeds well into the twenty-first century.

Hispanics had the lowest homeownership rate in the country in all years, except for 2002, up until 2005. For the last half of the decade of the 2000s the homeownership rate for Hispanics exceeded that of African Americans. Temporal fluctuations were slight for all races, with rates commonly not changing more than two percentage points per year.

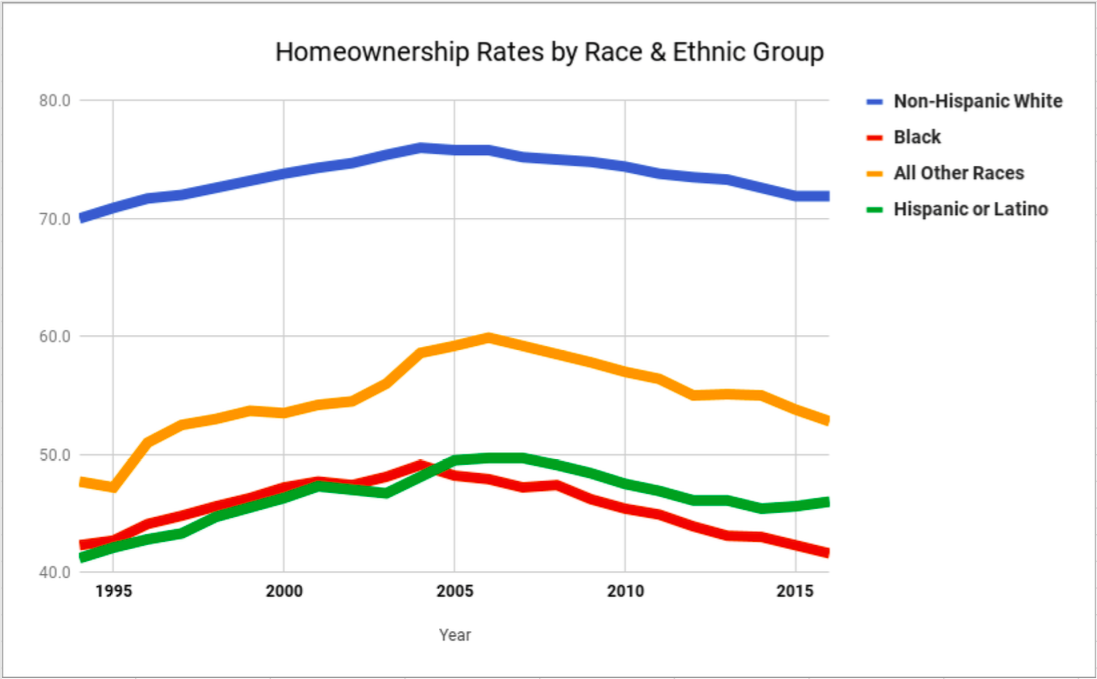
Homeownership rates by race and ethnicity from 1994 until 2015

The strongest increase in the percentage of homeowners in the first half of the decade of the 2000s was among non-white minorities. The homeownership rate for minorities approached the sixty percent mark in 2006, which was a significant change because less than half of all minority households owned homes as recently as 1994. The ownership rate for minorities increased by 25.6%, from 47.7% in 1993 to 59.9% in 2006. This rate fell after the 2006 peak, consistent with overall homeownership rates.

The increase among White Americans was less substantial. In 2005, 75.8% of white Americans owned their own homes, compared to 70% in 1993, and the rate fell during the last half of the decade of the 2000s, slightly more slowly than for the rest of the population. Thus one can conclude that despite a large remaining discrepancy between the homeownership rates among different racial groups, the gap had been closing up until the peak, with ownership rates increasing more substantially for minorities than for whites, but subsequently began slightly widening.

Race	1994	1995	1996	1997	1998	1999	2000	2001	2002	2003	2004	2005	2006	2007	2008	2009	2010	2011	2012	2013	2014	2015	% change since '94
White (non-Hispanic)	70.0	70.9	71.7	72.0	72.6	73.2	73.8	74.3	74.5	75.4	76.0	75.8	75.8	75.2	75.0	74.8	74.4	73.8	73.5	73.3	72.6	71.9	+2.71%
Asian American	51.3	50.8	50.8	52.8	52.6	53.1	52.8	53.9	54.7	56.3	59.8	60.1	60.8	60.0	59.5	59.3	58.9	58.0	56.6	57.4	57.3	56.1	+9.35%
Native American	51.7	55.8	51.6	51.7	54.3	56.1	56.2	55.4	54.6	54.3	55.6	58.2	58.2	56.9	56.5	56.2	52.3	53.5	51.1	51.0	52.2	50.3	(-2.08%)
African American	42.3	42.7	44.1	44.8	45.6	46.3	47.2	47.7	47.3	48.1	49.1	48.2	47.9	47.2	47.4	46.2	45.4	44.9	43.9	43.1	43.0	42.3	0.00%
Hispanic or Latino	41.2	42.1	42.8	43.3	44.7	45.5	46.3	47.3	48.2	46.7	48.1	49.5	49.7	49.7	49.1	48.4	47.5	46.9	46.1	46.1	45.4	45.6	+10.68%
Source: U.S. Census Bureau

=== Racism ===
The data from the United States Census Bureau shows black Americans have the lowest rate of homeownership in the US. According to the National Association of Realtors, blacks and Hispanic Americans face higher mortgage rates than their white and Asian counterparts, and more illegal discrimination in real estate transactions. The Fair Housing Act is a law established to help stop illegal discrimination against potential minority homeowners in the U.S. The law is enforced by the United States Department of Housing and Urban Development. Also, black and Hispanic households usually face more personal challenges such as the likelihood of higher personal debt, lower incomes, lower credit scores, or lower savings than the average buyer for a home purchase.

== Type of household ==
The median age of US homebuyers has increased in recent decades, for both first-time buyers and repeat buyers.

There is a strong correlation between the type and age of a household's family structure and homeownership. As of 2006, married couple families, which also have the highest median income of any household type, were most likely to own a home. Age played a significant role as well, with homeownership increasing with the age of the householder until age 65, when a slight decrease becomes visible. While only 43% of households with a householder under the age of thirty-five owned a home, 81.6% of those with a householder between the ages of 55 and 64 did. According to Zillow's data analysis, the median age of renters who are heads of households is age 41 years, up from age 37 in 2000.

This means that households with a middle-aged householder were nearly twice as likely to own a home as those with a young householder. Overall, married couple families with a householder age 70 to 74 had the highest homeownership rate, with 93.3% being homeowners. The lowest homeownership rate was recorded for single females under the age of twenty-five, of whom only 13.6% were homeowners. Yet, single females had an overall higher homeownership rate than single males and single mothers.

== Income ==
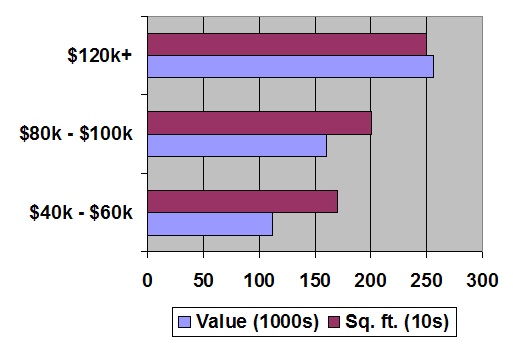
Housing characteristics according to income in 2002

There are considerable correlations between income, homeownership rate and housing characteristics. As income is closely linked to social status, sociologist Leonard Beeghley has made the hypothesis that "the lower the social class, then the fewer amenities built into housing." According to 2002, US Census Bureau data housing characteristics vary considerably with income. For homeowners with middle-range household incomes, ranging from $40,000 to $60,000, the median home value was $112,000, while the median size was 1,700 square feet (160 m^{2}) and the median year of construction was 1970. A slight majority, 54% of homes occupied by owners in this group had two or more bathrooms.

According to a 2004 report, among homeowners with household incomes in the top 10%, those earning more than $120,000 a year, home values were considerably higher while houses were larger and newer. The median value for homes in this demographic was $256,000 while median square footage was 2,500 and the median year of construction was 1977. The vast majority, 80%, had two or more bathrooms. Overall, houses of those with higher incomes were larger, newer, more expensive with more amenities.

U.S. home prices have risen significantly faster than incomes. After accounting for inflation, home prices jumped 118% from 1965 to 2021, while income had only increased by 15%. High demand and low supply in most cities will likely continue to keep home prices outpacing income increases. According to a Realtor.com analysis, there was a shortage of about 2.3 million homes by the end of 2022, compared to an increase of about 500,000 since 2012.

=== Wealth accumulation ===
Homeownership is the primary asset most Americans use to generate wealth. For a majority of U.S. homeowners, their home equity represents 50-70% of their net wealth. As of January 2025, the average mortgage-holding homeowner had approximately US$311,000 in equity.

== Political influence ==
Homeownership influences the political participation of individuals, with homeowners more likely to participate in local elections. Owning a home increases the likelihood of participating in local primaries by 35%. Voter turnout probability increases with the value of the home. Becoming a homeowner influences an individual's political outlook, as they are more likely to vote in ways they perceive as protecting their investment. Being a homeowner increases the likelihood of political participation by 75% when issue of zoning are decided. For national elections, homeowners are more likely than renters to participate in primaries and general elections; their turnout is about 10 points higher than renters for general elections.

For those who use private mortgages to finance homeownership, their party affiliation polarizes towards one of the two major political parties. Individuals who buy homes through Federal Housing Administration-supported mortgages are much more likely to become Democrats.

== History of homeownership rate ==
Year	Homeownership rate (%)
1960	62.1
1961	62.4
1962	63.0
1963	63.1
1964	63.1
1965	63.3
1966	63.4
1967	63.6
1968	63.9
1969	64.3
1970	64.2
1971	64.2
1972	64.4
1973	64.5
1974	64.6
1975	64.6
1976	64.7
1977	64.8
1978	65.0
1979	65.6
1980	65.6
1981	65.4
1982	64.8
1983	64.6
1984	64.5
1985	63.9
1986	63.8
1987	64.0
1988	63.8
1989	63.9
1990	63.9
1991	64.1
1992	64.1
1993	64.0
1994	64.0
1995	64.7
1996	65.4
1997	65.7
1998	66.3
1999	66.8
2000	67.4
2001	67.8
2002	67.9
2003	68.3
2004	69.0
2005	68.9
2006	68.8
2007	68.1
2008	67.8
2009	67.4
2010	66.9
2011	66.1
2012	65.4
2013	65.1
2014	64.5
2015	63.7
2016	63.4
2017	63.9
2018	64.4
2019	64.6
2020	66.6
2021	65.5
2022	65.8
2023	65.9
2024	65.6

== International comparison (as of 2022) ==
Country	Austria	Belgium	China	Denmark	France	Germany	Ireland	Norway	Spain	Portugal	UK	US	Slovenia	Israel	Canada
Homeownership rate	51%	72%	96%	59%	63%	46%	70%	79%	76%	77%	65%	65%	75%	64%	66%

== See also ==
- Starter home
- List of countries by home ownership rate
- Household income in the United States
- Real estate appraisal
- Economy of the United States
- Housing insecurity in the United States
- Eviction in the United States
- Poverty in the United States
- Homelessness in the United States
