= List of housing articles by area =

The following is a list of Wikipedia articles which cover housing in a specific sovereign country, region, city, or continent.

== Housing by country ==
- Housing in Antigua and Barbuda
- Housing in Azerbaijan
- Housing in China
- Housing in Egypt
- Housing in Ethiopia
- Housing in India
- Housing in Israel
- Housing in Japan
- Housing in New Zealand
- Housing in Pakistan
- Housing in Russia
- Housing in Senegal
- Housing in South Africa
- Housing in South Korea
- Housing in the United Kingdom
- Housing in the United States

== Housing by region or city ==
- Housing in Delaware
- Housing in Glasgow
- Housing in Scotland
- Housing in New York (state)
- Housing in Florida
- Housing in Hong Kong
- Housing in Victoria, Australia
- Housing in Vienna

== Housing by continent ==
- Housing in Europe

== See also ==
- Public housing
- Slum
