= Housing =

Living spaces

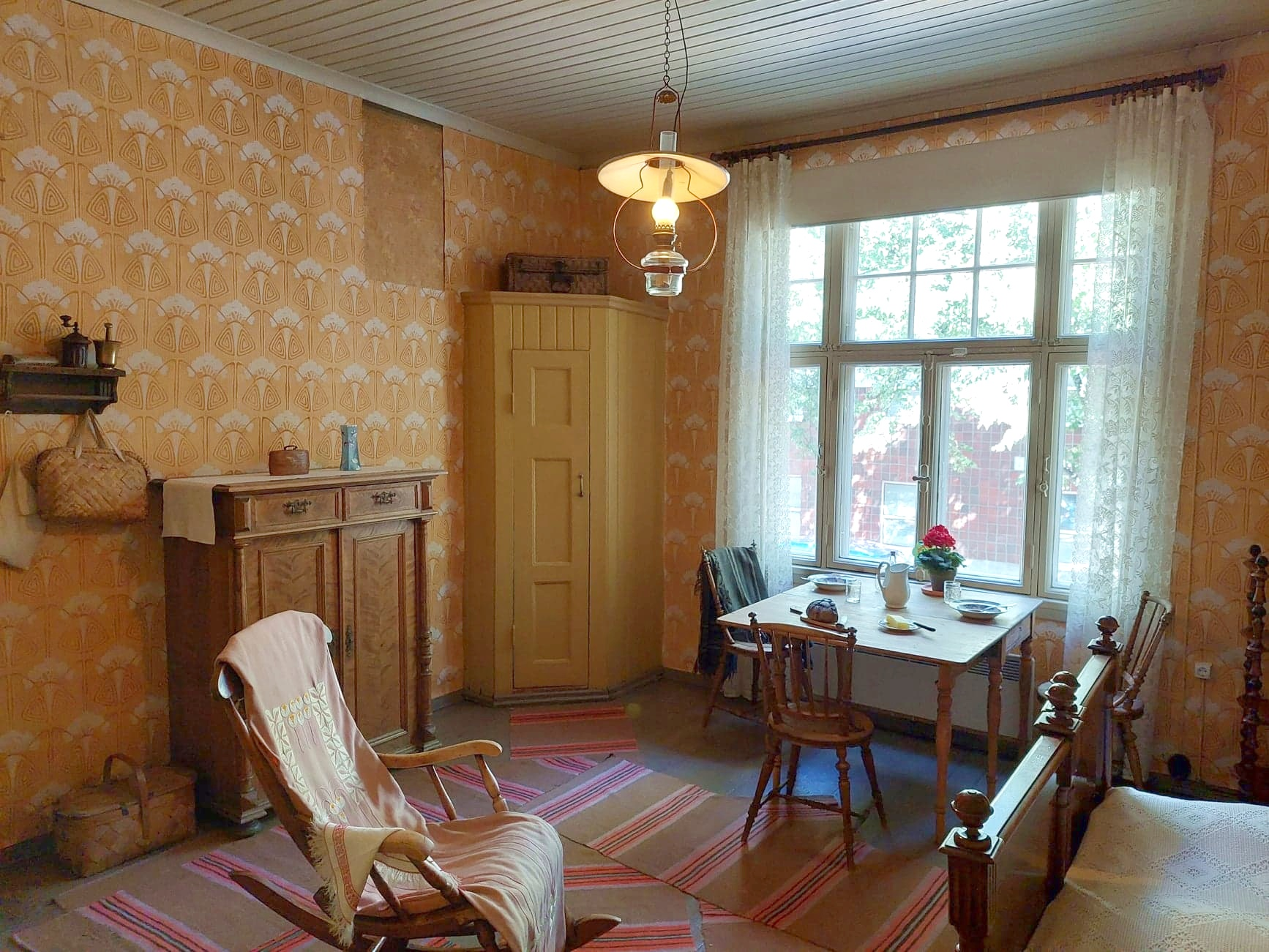
Industrialization brought mass migration to cities. This one-room worker home from Helsinki from 1911 represents an attempt by the city government to improve the conditions of workers; for example, electricity and running water were installed in this row house.

Housing is a shelter used as a dwelling or living space by individuals, families, or a collective. It provides a space for preparing food, storing belongings, caring for children and the elderly, and maintaining privacy. Housing also refers to the act of providing shelter or protective cover.

Housing was a central concern of social reform movements in the 19th century when it was understood as a fundamental human need, distinct from spaces designated for work, healthcare, and education. In 1948, housing was recognized as a human right in Article 25 of the Universal Declaration of Human Rights, establishing housing as a necessary condition for an adequate standard of living. By the end of the 20th century, housing was increasingly understood as a space used for personal maintenance, rest, and leisure.

From the 1950s to 1970s, the supply of adequate housing expanded globally due to public subsidies and the direct construction of publicly owned housing. Since the 1980s, home mortgages have become the most common means worldwide for individuals and families to access housing, while governments have shifted toward facilitation of the private mortgage market The securitization of mortgage debt on a global scale since the early 2000s has further contributed to framing housing as investment property while the supply of adequate housing has continued to shrink.

Housing includes a wide range of sub-genres from apartments and houses to temporary shelters and emergency accommodations. Access to safe, stable, and affordable housing is essential for a person to achieve optimal health, safety, and overall well-being. Housing affects economic, social, and cultural opportunities as it is directly linked to education, employment, healthcare, and social networks. In many countries, housing policies and programs have been developed to address housing issues related to affordability, quality, and availability. These programs and policies are referred to as housing authorities, also known as a housing ministry or housing department.

Generally, there are two types of housing, market housing and non-market housing. Market housing refers to housing that is bought and sold on the open market, with prices and rent determined by supply and demand. Market housing is owned by private individuals or corporations and consists of apartments, condominiums, private housing, etc. Non-market housing refers to housing that is provided and managed by the government or non-profit organizations. The goal of non-market housing is to provide affordable housing for individuals or families considered low-income. Non-market housing is subsidized, meaning that rent is lower than the market rate, and tenants may be eligible for rent assistance programs. Non-market housing consists of public, social, and cooperative housing among others.

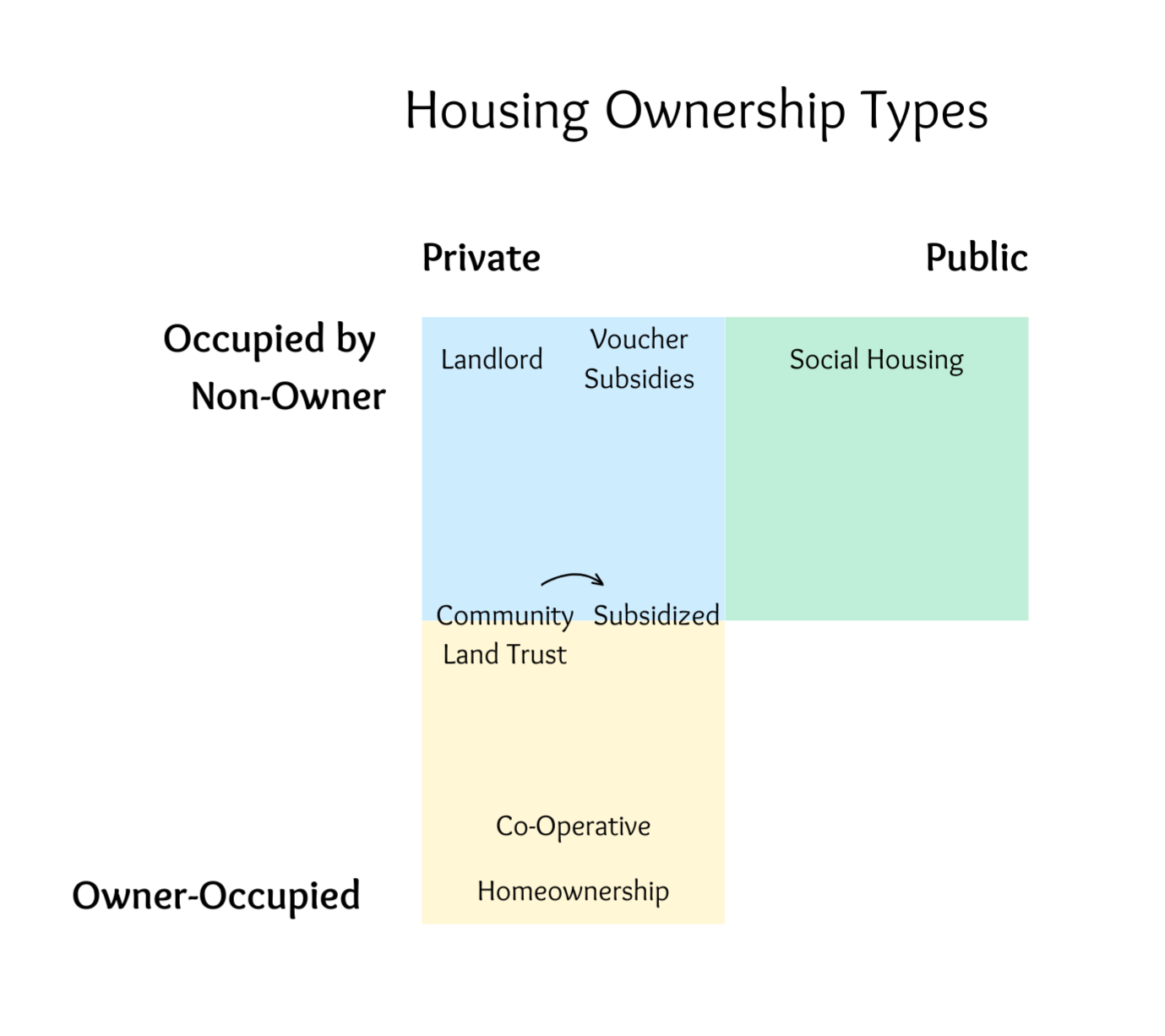
Housing can vary widely in occupant ownership status and public investment.

== Macroeconomy and housing price ==
Housing prices are affected by the macroeconomy. Research conducted in 2018 indicates that a 1% increase in the Consumer Price Index leads to a $3,559,715 increase in housing prices. As a result this raises the property price per square foot by $119.3387. Money Supply (M2) has a positive relationship with housing prices. A study conducted in Hong Kong reported that as M2 increased by one unit, housing prices rose by 0.0618. When there is a 1% increase in the best lending rate, housing prices drop between $18,237.26 and $28,681.17 in the HAC model. Mortgage repayments lead to a rise in the discount window base rate. A 1% rise in the rate leads to a $14,314.69 drop in housing prices, and an average selling price drop of $585,335.50. In the United States, when there is a 1% increase in the US real interest rate, the property prices decrease from $9302.845 to $4957.274, and sellable area drops by $4.955206 and $14.01284. When there is a 1% rise in overnight Hong Kong Interbank Offered Rate, the housing prices drop to about 3455.529, and the price per ft2 will drop by $187.3119.

=== Housing affordability index ===
A housing affordability index (HAI) is an index that measures housing affordability, usually the degree to which the median person or family in a particular country or region can afford housing/housing-related costs.

=== Housing crisis ===
An affordable housing crisis or housing crisis is either a widespread housing shortage in places where people want to live or a financial crisis in the housing market. Housing crises can contribute to homelessness and housing insecurity. They are difficult to address, because they are a complex "web of problems and dysfunctions" with many contributing factors, including structural causes like government policy, and proximate causes like housing costs rising faster than household income.

== Health and housing ==
Housing is recognized as a social determinant of health. While high-quality housing environments positively contribute to an individual's health, poor housing or a complete lack thereof leads to negative health effects. Lack of housing or poor-quality housing can negatively affect an individual's physical and mental health. Housing attributes that negatively affect physical health include dampness, mold, inadequate heating, and overcrowding. Mental health is also affected by inadequate heating, overcrowding, dampness, and mold, in addition to a lack of personal space. Another factor that negatively impacts mental health is housing instability. Negative health effects that impact children include potential exposure to asthma triggers or lead, and injuries caused by structural deficiencies (e.g. lack of window guards or radiator covers).

Family members with poor health reduce debt to avoid risks. Data from the China House Finance Survey used a partial least squares structural equation model for results that indicated family member's poor health and individuals with uninsured endowment insurance have an adverse impact on housing debt and family assets.

== By region ==
- Housing in Azerbaijan
- Housing in Barbuda
- Housing in China
  - Housing in Hong Kong
- Housing in Egypt
- Housing in Ethiopia
- Housing in Europe
- Housing in India
- Housing in Israel
- Housing in Japan
- Housing in New Zealand
- Housing in Pakistan
- Housing in Portugal
- Housing in Senegal
- Housing in South Korea
- Housing in the United Kingdom
  - Housing in Scotland
- Housing in the United States

== See also ==
- Affordable housing
- Category:Housing ministries
- Homeowner association
- Housing association
- Housing estate
- Housing First
- Informal housing
- List of housing statutes
- List of human habitation forms
- NIMBY
- Right to housing
- Subsidized housing
- Tasmanian House
- Urban planning
- US Federal Housing Administration
- YIMBY
- Zoning
