= Housing in Arkansas =

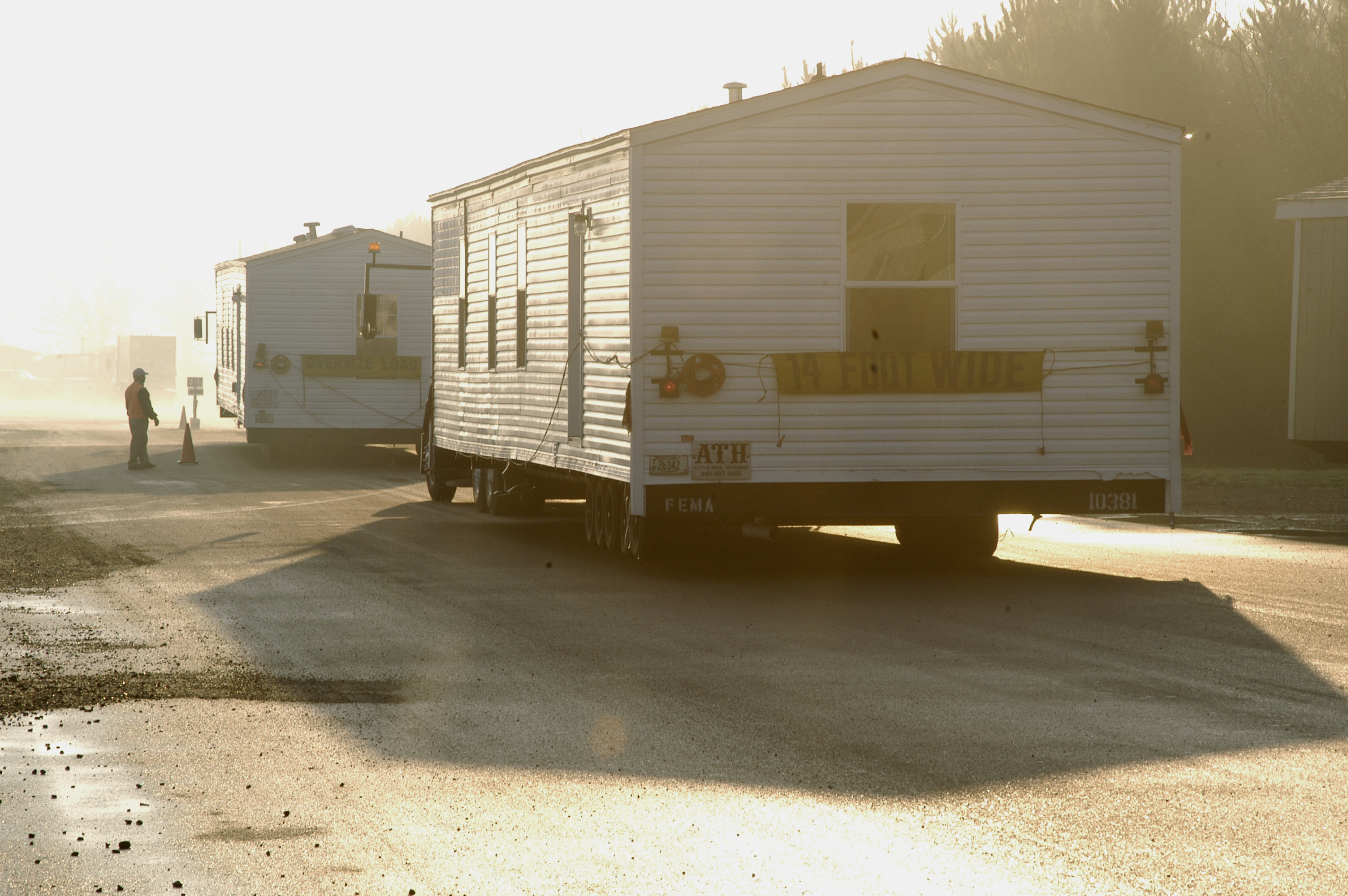
A mobile home headed to Arkansas in 2007

Housing in Arkansas takes a variety of forms, from single-family homes to apartment complexes. Arkansas had a homeownership rate of 65.2% in 2017. Issues related to housing in Arkansas include homeownership, affordable housing, housing insecurity, zoning, and homelessness.

== Background ==
According to the U.S. Census Bureau, there were 1,365,265 housing units in Arkansas in 2020. There were an estimated 2,073 homeless individuals in Arkansas in 2020, according to the Annual Homeless Assessment Report.

The U.S. Department of Housing and Urban Development administers programs that provide housing and community development assistance in the United States. Adequate housing is recognized as human right in the 1948 Universal Declaration of Human Rights and in the 1966 International Covenant on Economic, Social and Cultural Rights.
