= Housing in Connecticut =

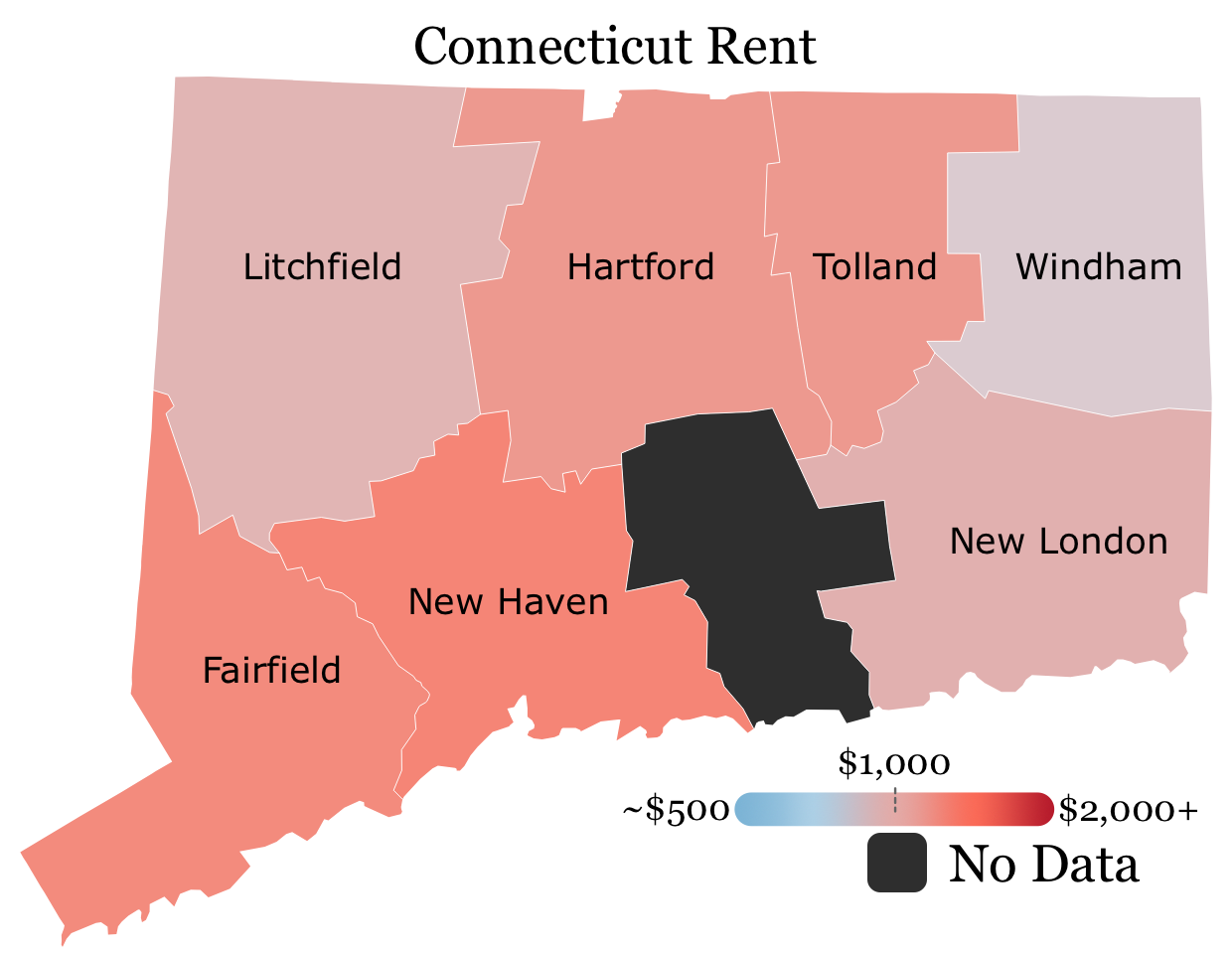
Average rent in the counties of Connecticut in 2022.

Housing in Connecticut takes a variety of forms, from single family homes to apartment complexes. Connecticut had a homeownership rate of 66.4% in 2017. Issues related to housing in Connecticut include homeownership, affordable housing, housing insecurity, zoning, and homelessness.

== Background ==
According to the U.S. Census Bureau, there were 1,530,197 housing units in Connecticut in 2020. There were an estimated 2.905 homeless individuals in Connecticut in 2020, according to the Annual Homeless Assessment Report.

A survey by the US Prison system from 2017 to 2020 found that 30% of released prisoners in New Haven experienced homelessness in the last 6 months, but over half were only homeless for part of that time. Close to 75% of the people surveyed also stated they stayed in someone else's home to avoid homelessness. The same survey found that 66% of the people surveyed thought there was 50% or higher chance they wouldn't be living in the same place in 6 months.

In 2024, Connecticut was ranked the worst state for renters.

The U.S. Department of Housing and Urban Development administers programs that provide housing and community development assistance in the United States. Adequate housing is recognized as human right in the 1948 Universal Declaration of Human Rights and in the 1966 International Covenant on Economic, Social and Cultural Rights.

== Affordable housing ==
In 1989, Connecticut enacted a law called 8-30g which allows developers to sue a town if it rejects the developer's proposal for certain types of affordable housing.
