= Housing in Colorado =

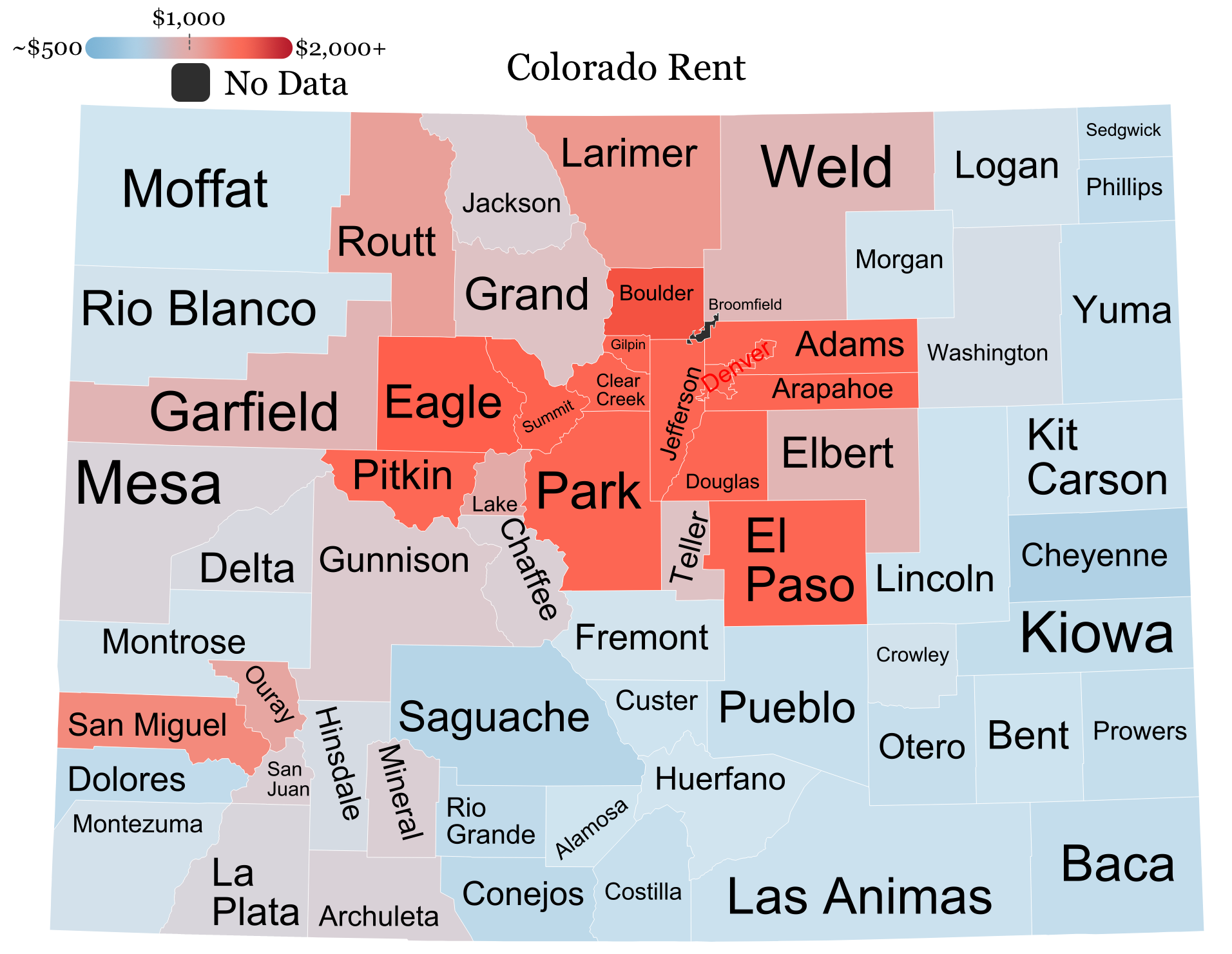
Average rent (per month) in the counties of Colorado as of 2022

Housing in Colorado takes a variety of forms, from single-family homes to apartment complexes. Colorado had a homeownership rate of 66.6% in 2017. Issues related to housing in Colorado include homeownership, affordable housing, housing insecurity, zoning, and homelessness.

== Background ==
According to the U.S. Census Bureau, there were 2,491,404 housing units in Colorado in 2020. There were an estimated 9,846 homeless individuals in Colorado in 2020, according to the Annual Homeless Assessment Report.

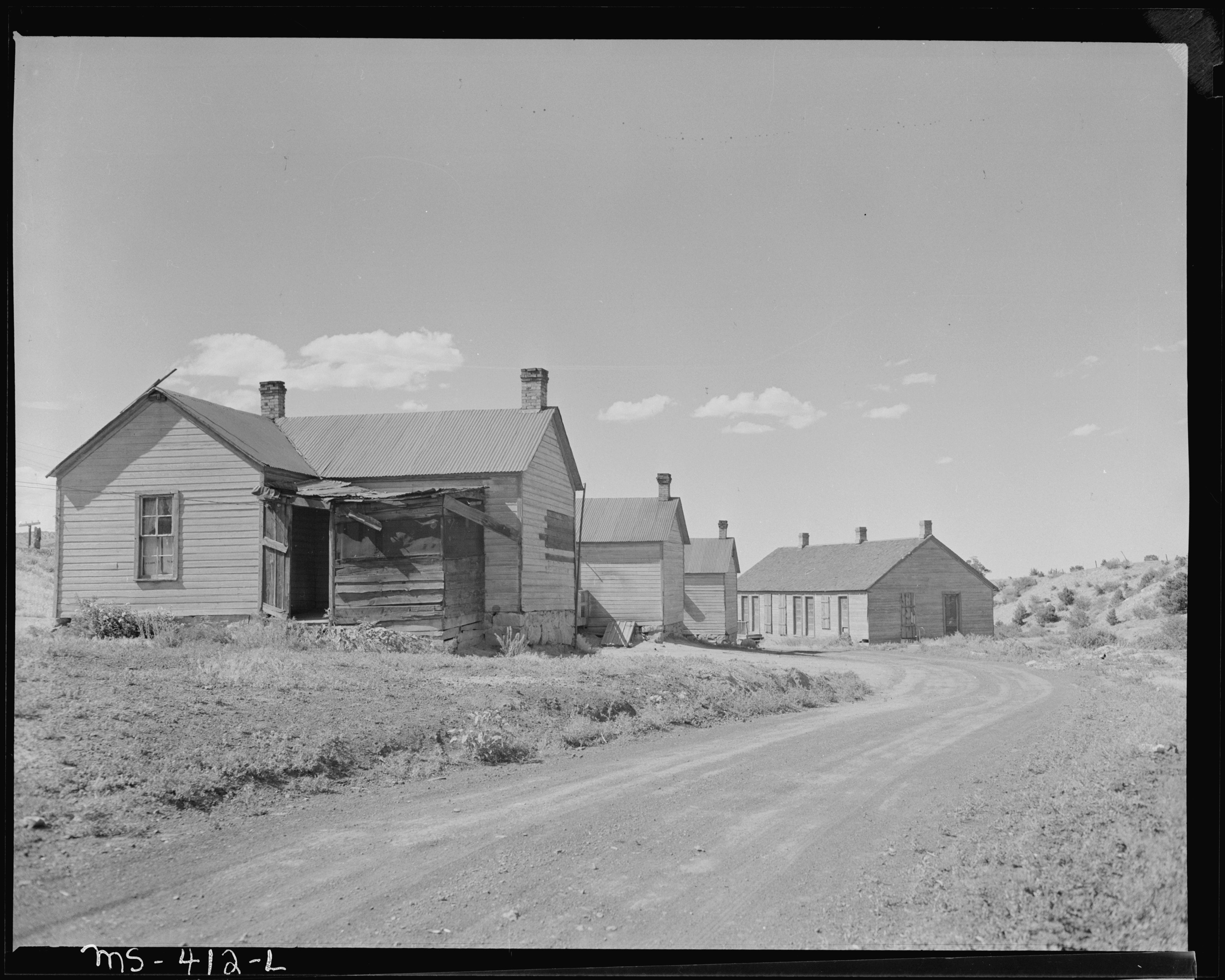
Company housing for coal miners in 1946 in Colorado

The U.S. Department of Housing and Urban Development administers programs that provide housing and community development assistance in the United States. Adequate housing is recognized as human right in the 1948 Universal Declaration of Human Rights and in the 1966 International Covenant on Economic, Social and Cultural Rights.
