= Housing in Georgia (U.S. state) =

Housing in Georgia takes a variety of forms, from single-family homes to apartment complexes. Georgia had a homeownership rate of 61.6% in 2017. Issues related to housing in Georgia include homeownership, affordable housing, housing insecurity, zoning, and homelessness.

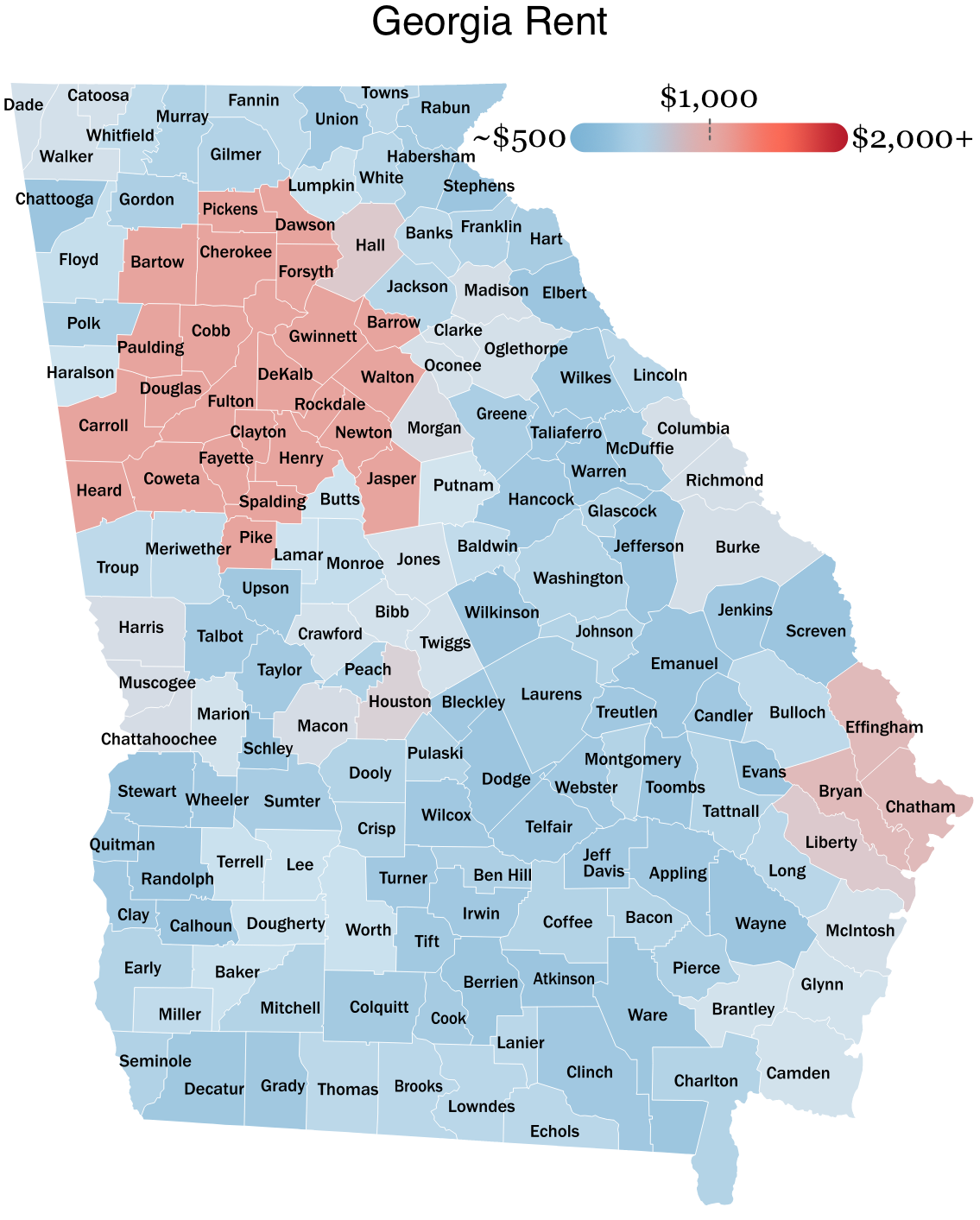
Average rent in Georgia as of 2022

== Background ==
According to the U.S. Census Bureau, there were 4,410,956 housing units in Georgia in 2020. There were an estimated 10,234 homeless individuals in Georgia in 2020, according to the Annual Homeless Assessment Report.

The U.S. Department of Housing and Urban Development administers programs that provide housing and community development assistance in the United States. Adequate housing is recognized as human right in the 1948 Universal Declaration of Human Rights and in the 1966 International Covenant on Economic, Social and Cultural Rights.
