= Flint House =

Flint House may refer to:

- The Police Rehabilitation Centre, Flint House, in the United Kingdom
- Flint House (Massachusetts)
- Flint House, Buckinghamshire, 2015 house in England
- Flint House (University of Chicago)

== See also ==
- Flintstone Homes, Ethiopian real estate
