= Housing in New York (state) =

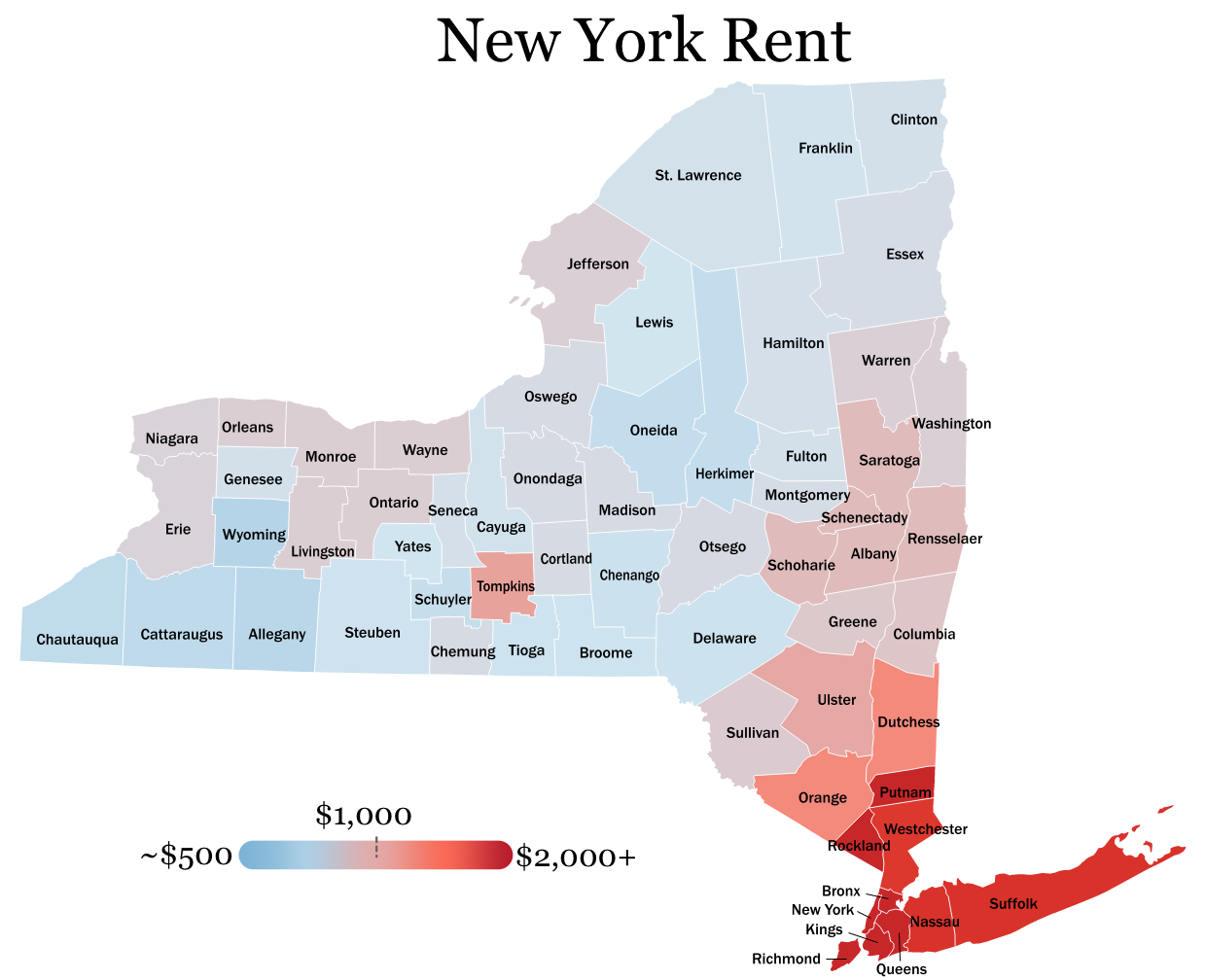
Average rent in counties of New York as of 2022

Housing in New York takes a variety of forms, from single-family homes to apartment complexes. New York had a homeownership rate of 50.7% in 2017. Issues related to housing in New York include homeownership, affordable housing, housing insecurity, zoning, and homelessness.

== Background ==
According to the United States Census Bureau, there were 8,488,066 housing units in New York in 2020. There were an estimated 91,271 homeless individuals in New York in 2020, according to the Annual Homeless Assessment Report.

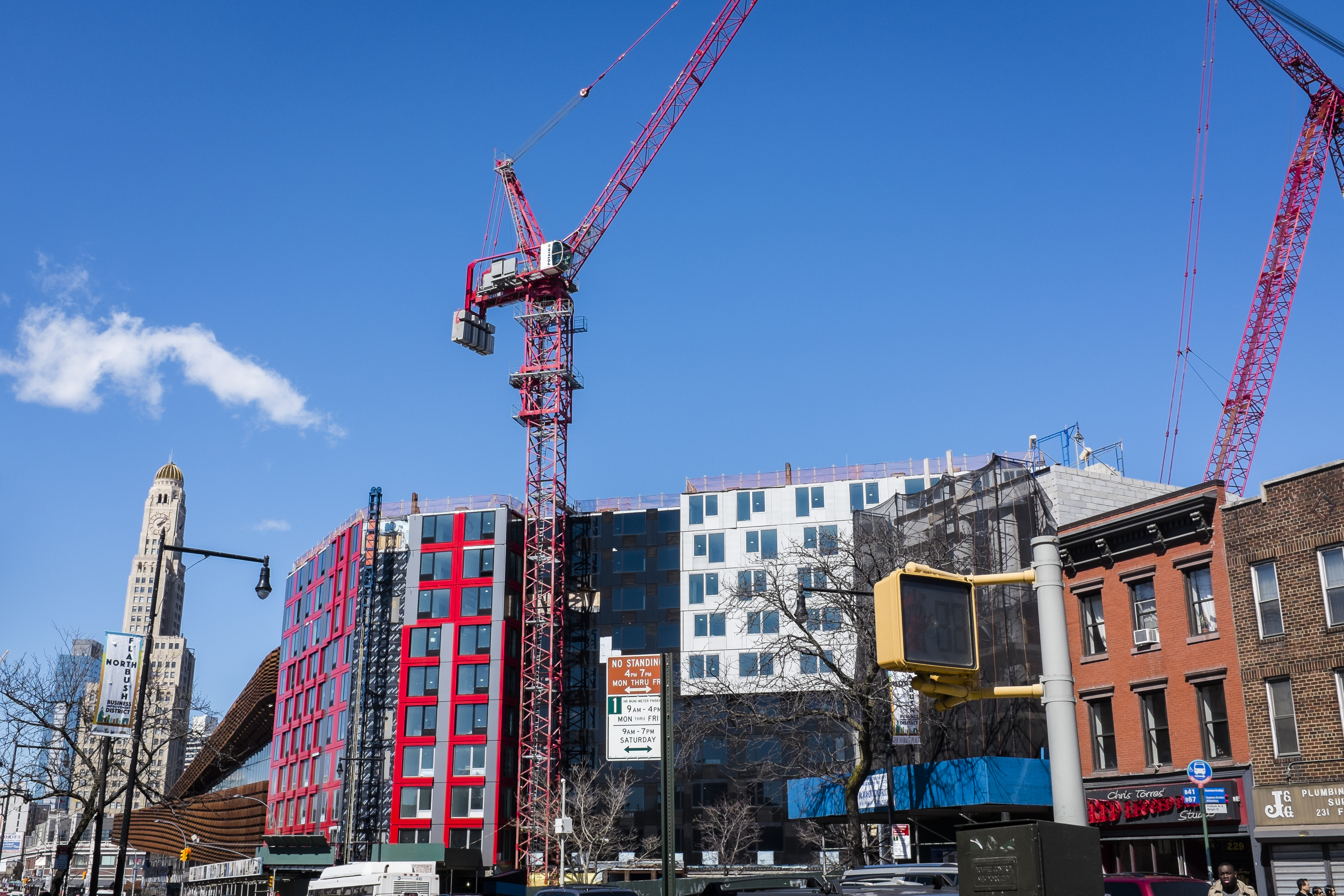
Housing being built in New York City

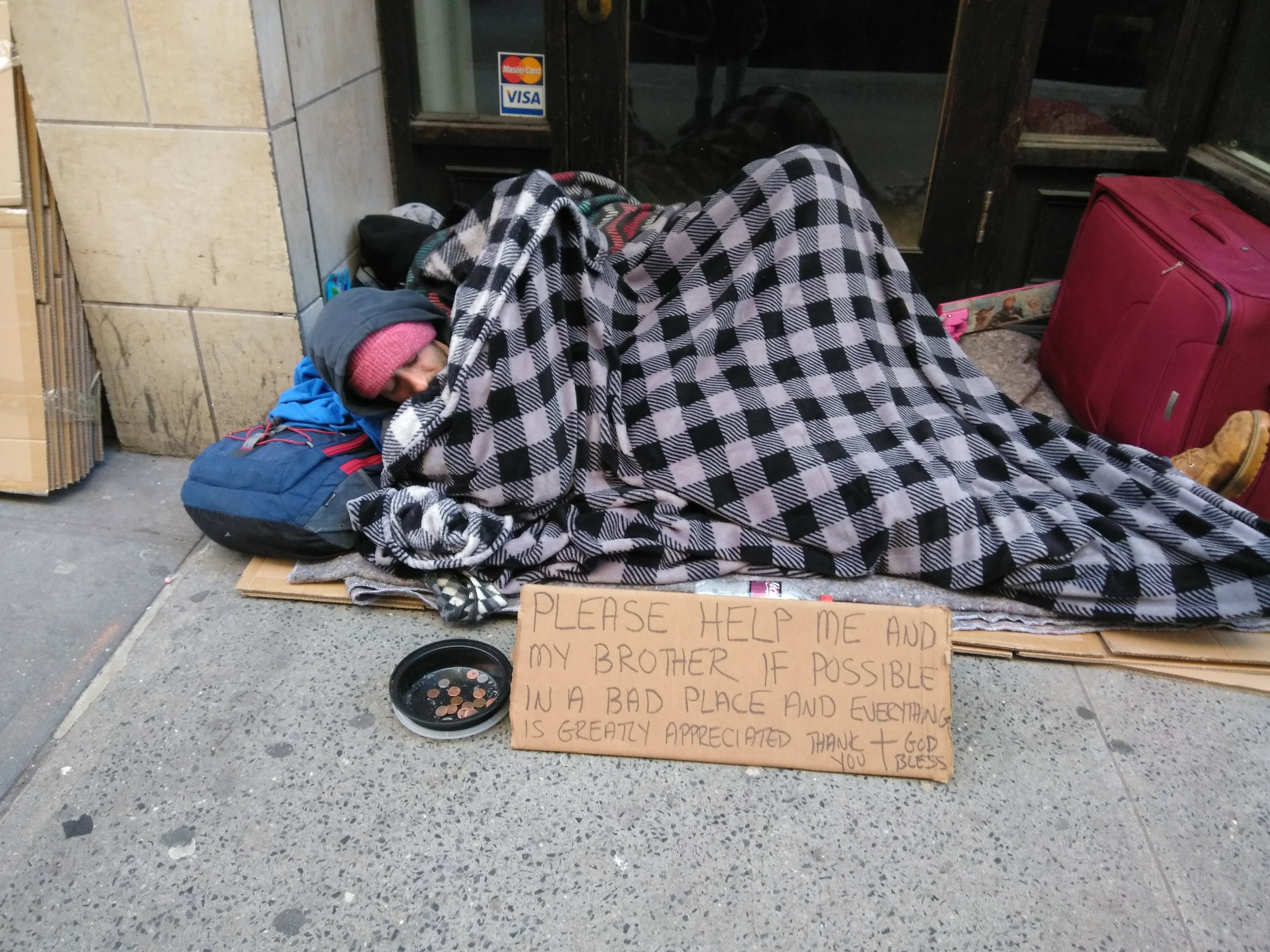
Homeless person in New York City

The U.S. Department of Housing and Urban Development administers programs that provide housing and community development assistance in the United States. Adequate housing is recognized as human right in the 1948 Universal Declaration of Human Rights and in the 1966 International Covenant on Economic, Social and Cultural Rights.

== Housing shortage ==
There is a shortage of housing in New York City. There are not enough homes for everyone who wants to live there to find a place to rent or buy. This has driven rent prices in New York City to be the highest in the United States as of 2022.

In 2023, there were approximately 3,705,000 housing units in New York City, an increase of 61,000 since 2021.

=== Vacancy rate ===
In 2017, New York City had a vacancy rate of 3.63%. In 2023, that number dropped to 1.4% – the lowest since 1968. The vacancy rate was lowest in lowest-rent units; in units that cost less than $2,400 a month, the net vacancy rate was lower than 1%, and for units costing less than $1,100 a month the net vacancy was around 0.39%.

== Prices ==
As of 2025, housing prices in the NYC area are so high that most first-time home buyers, even if they are relatively well paid, can only afford to buy a home if their parents can give them large sums of money. A small studio apartment typically sells for more than US$500,000. The Urban Institute estimates that only 40% of all NYC residents, and only 28% of families with children, are able to support themselves financially, due in large part to the high cost of housing.

In 2024, half of home buyers in Manhattan paid cash for their homes.

== See also ==
- Great Wealth Transfer
- New York City housing shortage
