= Ayat Real Estate =

Ethiopian real estate developer

Coordinates: 9.0156°N 38.7871°E

Ayat Real Estate S.C.
- Industry: Real estate development
- Founded: 1997; 29 years ago
- Founder: Ayalew Tesema
- Headquarters: Addis Ababa, Ethiopia
- Website: www.ayatrealestate.com

Ayat Real Estate (Amharic: አያት ሪል ስቴት) is an Ethiopian real estate developer in Addis Ababa. A pioneer for real estate housing project, it was established in 1997 by Ayalew Tesema. The real estate offers 40/60 or 60/40 payment program.

== History ==
Ayat Real Estate was founded in 1997 by Ayalew Tesema. It engaged in construction, development and finance real estates with payment program of 40/60 or 60/40. The real estates offered more than 10,000 houses, becoming the largest construction company. The real estate site is located in Ayat and CMC in Addis Ababa with projects Ayat Apartments, CMC business outlet and CMC Apartments respectively.

== See also ==
- Housing in Ethiopia
