= Housing Bank of Senegal =

Senegal Financial institution

- Native name: Banque de l'Habitat du Sénégal
- Type: Development finance institution
- Industry: Financial services
- Founded: 1979; 47 years ago
- Headquarters: Dakar, Senegal
- Products: Mortgages
- Owner: Partially state owned
- Website: www.bhs.sn

The Housing Bank of Senegal (French: Banque de l'Habitat du Sénégal) is a financial institution that is a major actor in the housing finance market in Senegal. In 2013, it held about 30% if mortgage related loans in Senegal. Minority owned by the government, it strives to provide funds to developers, housing cooperatives and individuals for development of affordable housing in Senegal.

The bank offers financial incentives to housing cooperatives in the form of favorable rates. By the 2000s, the bank had given out over $409 million in its 30 year existence.

== History ==
Founded in 1979 as a private - public venture, it began operation in March 1980. A primary objective was to mobilize savings for long term investments in mortgage related lending to lower and middle income earners. Funds were transferred over a ten year period from an earlier initiative for urban development, a government treasury funded plan for the improvement of housing and urban development.
