= Housing in Delaware =

Housing in Delaware takes a variety of forms, from single-family homes to apartment complexes. Delaware had a homeownership rate of 68.7% in 2017. Issues related to housing in Delaware include homeownership, affordable housing, housing insecurity, zoning, and homelessness.

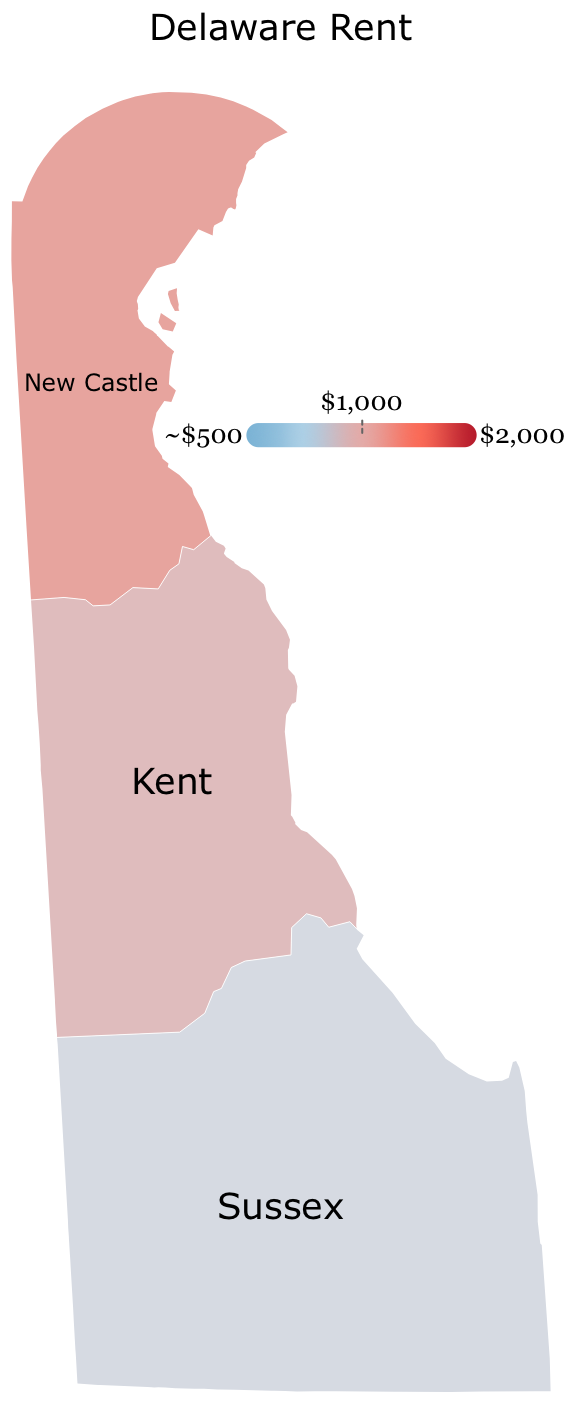
Average rent in Delaware as of 2022

== Background ==
According to the U.S. Census Bureau, there were 448,735 housing units in Delaware in 2020. There were an estimated 1,165 homeless individuals in Delaware in 2020, according to the Annual Homeless Assessment Report.

The U.S. Department of Housing and Urban Development administers programs that provide housing and community development assistance in the United States. Adequate housing is recognized as human right in the 1948 Universal Declaration of Human Rights and in the 1966 International Covenant on Economic, Social and Cultural Rights.
