= Housing in Antigua and Barbuda =

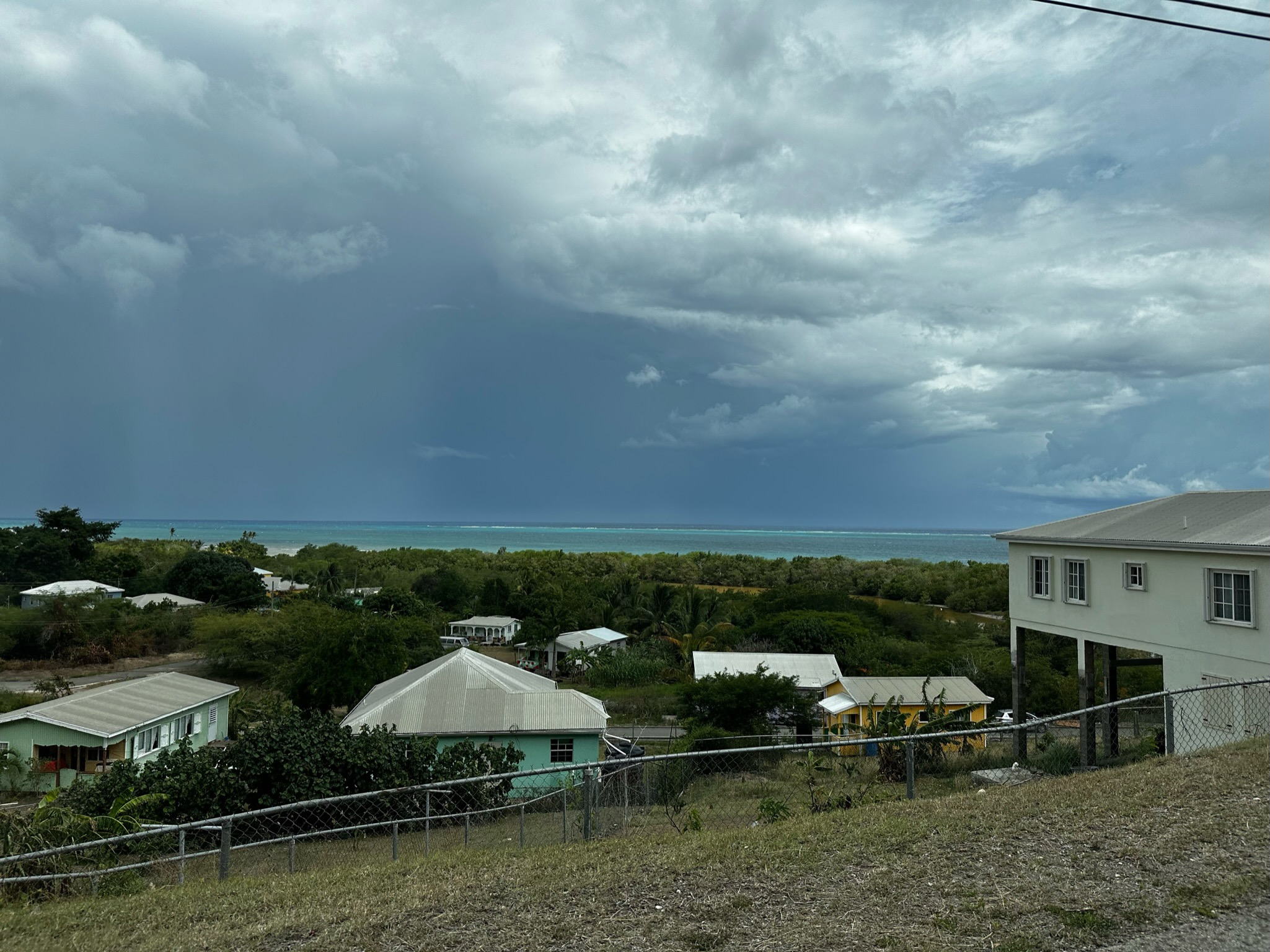
A residential area in Urlings

Housing in Antigua and Barbuda comes in a diverse array of forms and structures. As of 2011, the homeownership rate is 58%. The real estate market in the country is rapidly growing, primarily due to government intervention and heavy foreign investment, especially in coastal regions which are out of reach to the majority of Antiguan and Barbudan homebuyers.

Housing in the archipelago has a history dating back to the Pre-Columbian era. The Arawak were the first to build permanent settlements on the islands, living in tall homes built to aid in the collection of rainwater. Following the arrival of Europeans, a system of private land ownership was introduced, being organised around plantations staffed by slaves. Slaves often built their basic quarters in and around these plantations. Similar basic structures were also the basis of many post-emancipation villages, with former slaves owning 1,037 homes by 1838.

Due to rising incomes and increased concern for hurricanes and other natural disasters, most homes in Antigua and Barbuda are constructed at least partially with concrete. Older homes are more likely to be constructed this way, with only 31% of homes built before 1980 being exclusively constructed with wood, compared to 42% of homes built in 2010. Much of this trend can be attributed to concrete homes being more likely to survive decades of hurricanes. The vast majority of homes (89%) have sheet metal roofs.

== Public housing ==
Public housing in Antigua is overseen by the Central Housing and Planning Authority (CHAPA). Under the Gaston Browne administration, this agency has been tasked with constructing "starter homes" and initiating rent-to-own models. Public apartment complexes are also being built in the country, most notably the Chinese-funded Pelican Court development. Central government-funded housing initiatives remain controversial in Barbuda, especially due to these projects' conflicts with the Barbuda Land Act.

== See also ==
- Housing in Barbuda
