= Housing in Pakistan =

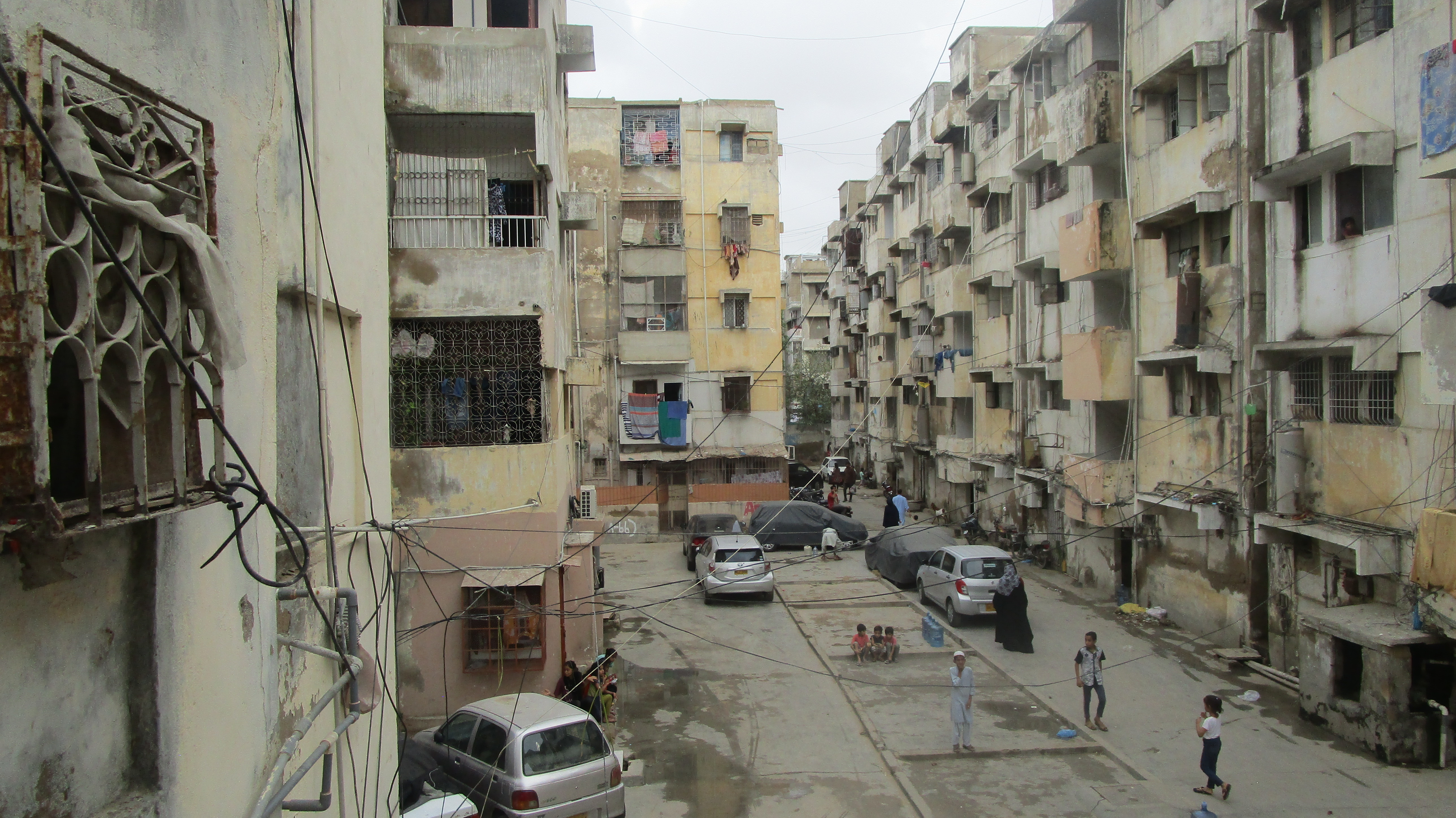
A square full of middle-class apartment buildings in Gulshan-e-Iqbal, Karachi.

Housing in Pakistan generally consists of three classes: pakka houses (पक्का/پکّا pakkā, lit. '"ripe"'), which are made of strong materials like brick and cement; katchi houses (کچی kachē, lit. '"unripe, semi-made, unsure"'), which are made of less-permanent materials such as thatch and bamboo; and semi-pakka houses, which are a mix of the pakka and katchi types.

Housing in Pakistan has always been insufficient due to a growing population (which is 241.49 million as per the 2023 Pakistani Census) and accelerated by urbanisation combined with the housing problem being low-priority in the eyes of the government. Housing is an important element of real estate in Pakistan.

== Housing shortage and deficit ==
Urban areas were facing a shortage of 4.4 million housing units in 2010, while the population is expected to grow by 40 million in 2030. Furthermore, this shortage is expected to grow due to a shortfall of 270,000 housing units per year. In Pakistan, past trends indicate that the increase in housing stock (146 percent increase) lagged far behind the population growth (209 percent increase) during 1960–1998, leading to overcrowding in housing units. The growth of housing in urban areas was far more rapid as compared to rural areas; 253 percent and 115 percent respectively. The habitation density level equals more than three people per room, which is significantly higher than the tolerable crowding level proposed by the UN-Habitat; 1.4 to 2.0 individuals per room. Urban crowding, specifically, has been accelerated by people from less-developed rural areas moving to cities to achieve better qualities of life.

== Housing finance in Pakistan ==
Housing financing is an important driver of housing in Pakistan and many banks are offering loans for house construction.

== Major housing societies ==
Several large planned housing developments have played a key role in urban expansion:

- Bahria Town (with projects in Islamabad, Lahore and Karachi)
- Defence Housing Authority (operating in Islamabad, Lahore, Karachi and other cities)
- Fazaia Housing Scheme
- Naval Anchorage
- Gulberg Islamabad

== See also ==
- Pakistan Islands Development Authority
- Naya Pakistan Housing & Development Authority
- Federal Government Employees Housing Authority
- Capital Development Authority – main planning authority in Islamabad
