= Naya Pakistan Housing & Development Authority =

Pakistan state-owned construction organisation

NAPHDA
- Naya Pakistan Housing & Development Authority
- Formation: 15 January 2020
- Key people: Captain (retd) Zafar Iqbal
- Website: https://naphda.gov.pk/

Naya Pakistan Housing & Development Authority (NAPHDA) is a national construction organisation of the Government of Pakistan. NAPHDA is responsible for the planning, development, construction and management of real estate projects across the country. Lieutenant General Anwar Ali Hyder, HI(M) (Retd.) served as initial chairman of the NAPHDA. In March 2025, Captain (retd) Zafar Iqbal, DG of the Federal Government Employees Housing Authority (PGEHA) was appointed Chairman.

== History ==
According to the State Bank of Pakistan (SBP), as of 2015 there was significant gap between housing demand and supply in major cities, with an estimated shortage of approximately 4.4 million units. This deficit was projected to worsen if then trends persisted, with the five largest cities in Pakistan expected to account for 78 percent of the overall housing deficit by 2035. In 2020, SBP estimated that the total housing deficit in 2020 stood at 10.3 million units, with urban areas facing a revised shortfall of 3.4 million units.

The Senate of Pakistan passed Naya Pakistan Housing and Development Authority Bill in 2019, and the Naya Pakistan Housing & Development Authority was established on 15 January 2020. The Naya Pakistan Housing Authority has been provided a subsidy of 30,000,000,000 Pakistani rupees. As of 2021, 1,820 applications out of over 8,000 received applications have been approved with an amount of ₨5,000,000,000.

== Housing Construction ==
According to Profit Magazine in October 2022, as against the end-goal of five million low-cost units (LCU) "only 17,005 LCUs are under construction or in planning state. And of those, only 3,720 units are for the general public. The rest are for government servants."

In four years of operation NAPHDA constructed 58,000 housing units from an originally target of 5 million and later 156,000 homes. Business Recorder in 2025 said, "many of the projects under NAPHDA were not initiated by the authority itself but were pre-existing schemes absorbed into its portfolio."

== See also ==
- Pakistan Islands Development Authority
