= 40/60 (housing program) =

Housing scheme in Ethiopia

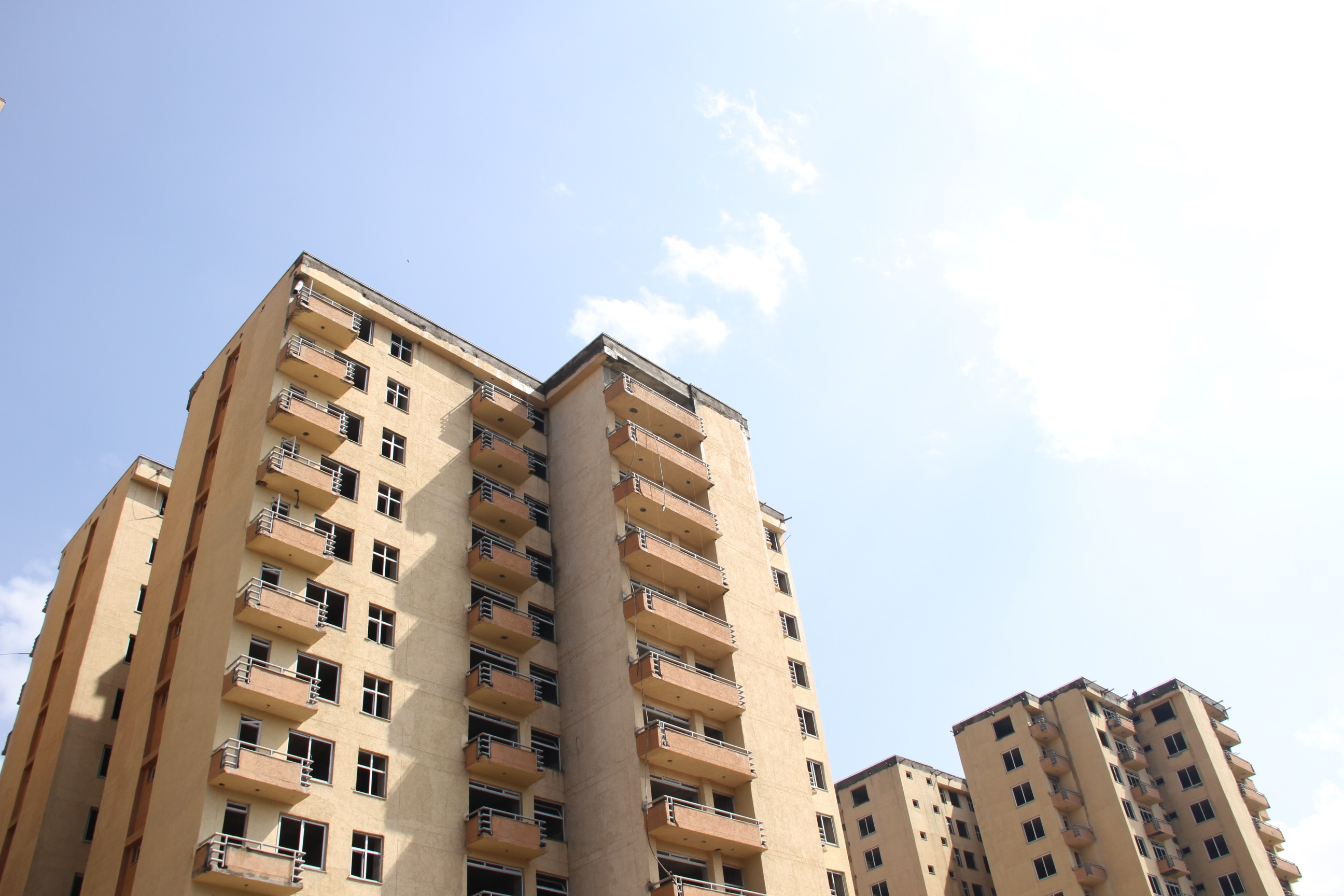
40/60 condominium in Senga Tera, Addis Ababa

In Ethiopia's housing system, 40/60 or 60/40 is a housing scheme centered around condominiums that have 24 upstairs and settled in urban areas. The program is constructed by the Addis Ababa Savings and Houses Development Enterprise (AASHDE) and the Addis Ababa Housing Project Office (AAHPO), and managed by the Addis Ababa City Administration.

A resident with enough money can buy lottery to win condominium and the winner is determined by the city administration.

== Description ==
40/60 housing program mainly centered around condominiums that have 24 upstairs and settled in urban areas. This program scheme is based on advanced payment modality such as 10/90, 20/80, 40/60 and housing association, constructed by the Addis Ababa Savings and Houses Development Enterprise (AASHDE) and the Addis Ababa Housing Project Office (AAHPO). In 2011, AASHDE reported that the project undertook 14 sites with nine structures. About 137 contractors and eleven consulting firms were participated to the project. Namely, in Senga Tera and Crown Hotel in Akaki Kaliti, the house units were transferred to beneficiaries in the first round in 2017. In the same year, the Addis Ababa City Administration planned to acquire buildings with 500 elevators and towers having 18 floors to engage international competitive bidding process.

During the bid process, an affording residents, usually through saving, can buy lottery and the winner is determined by the city administration.

== See also ==
- Housing in Ethiopia
