= Housing in Portugal =

Housing in Portugal is generally similar to housing in the rest of Europe. However, some specificities exist. Portugal has the highest rate of rural population in Western Europe, which means that roughly a third of the Portuguese families live in farms or properties outside urban areas. Another characteristic is that most of the urban population is actually suburban. The metropolitan areas of Lisbon and Porto have around 2.9 and 1.7 million inhabitants, respectively. In these areas, families live in apartment blocks, each apartment usually having two bedrooms, a living room, a kitchen and one or two bathrooms.

Most properties have been built since the 1970s, and especially since the turn of the millennium. This caused historical areas of Lisbon, Porto and other cities to become depopulated, though the younger generations now have a growing interest on buying and repairing these old buildings. The trendy district of Bairro Alto, in Lisbon, is an example of this.

Portuguese traditional architecture is quite similar to others of the Mediterranean, and whether a traditional country house or a suburban apartment bloc, Portuguese buildings and towns will look like those in Italy or Spain. This apart from the specificities of Portuguese architecture and its traditions, also excluding high rise projects inspired by the English Post-War tradition, the Socialist Bloc tradition and nowadays modern trends. Another strange, but somewhat common sight in Portugal, are the Swiss-like chalets, built by Portuguese people who lived in Switzerland or Germany. However, in recent years, traditional architecture is more popular.

Over two thirds of all Portuguese property is owned by the resident. House renting is more common in Lisbon, Porto, Coimbra and Aveiro, all of these cities having many students and foreign residents. Other areas where apartments are usually rented are sea resorts and the Algarve, this last region having many British, Irish, Dutch, German and French residents.

As of 2006, it costs around 500€ to rent a T1 (one bedroom and a living room) apartment in Lisbon, and 90.000€ to buy the same house. These prices force young couples and families to live in suburbs like Amadora, Odivelas or Almada, where housing is cheaper. However, luxury housing is an important market in Portugal, especially in the larger cities, as well as in Algarve, Cascais and the South Bank of the Tejo. All of the real estate market in Portugal is still recovering from a crisis, which means there are many empty houses in the suburbs, as well as construction firms in financial trouble.

Large projects of holiday housing featuring private beaches and golf resorts are very common in the South of the country.

== Typologies ==
Real estate industry in Portugal usually divides housing units in two classes: apartments (apartamento or andar) and separate houses (vivenda or moradia).

The apartments are classified in types T0, T1, T2, etc., that define the number of separate bedrooms. So a T0 means a studio apartment (no separate bedrooms, with bedroom and sitting room combined in the same single room), while a T2 means an apartment with two separate bedrooms (plus a living room). Usually, T0 apartments have a kitchenette while T1 and above apartments usually have a kitchen as a separate room. When an apartment has additional small bedrooms (only allowing a single bed and/or without window), the quantity of these rooms appear in the typology after a "+" (e.g. T1+1, means an apartment with a normal bedroom plus a small bedroom).

Separate houses are analogously classified, with a "V" prefix replacing the "T". So, a house with a living room and two bedrooms would be classified as V2.

The typologies with higher and lower number of housing units are respectively the T3 and the T1. By the order of percentages, the typologies are: T3 (22,5%), T2 (20,6%), T4 (9,3%), T5 (8,9%), T1 (6,2%) and T0 (1,0%).
