= Flintstone Homes =

Ethiopian real estate company

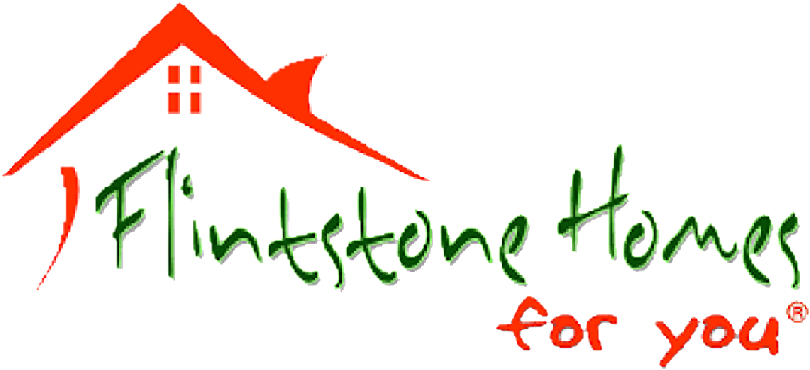

Project
- Opening date: 2008
- Developer: Tsedeke Yihune
- Owner: Flintstone Engineering S.C.O
- Website: flintstonehomes.com

Physical features
- Major buildings: 5,000 homes

Location
- Interactive map of Flintstone Homes
- Coordinates: 8.999°N 38.833°E
- Location: Goro, Bole sub-city, Addis Ababa, Ethiopia

Flintstone Homes (Amharic: ፍሊንትስቶን ሆምስ) is an Ethiopian real estate developer owned by Flintstone Engineering S.C.O and developed by Tsedeke Yihune. Initially known as Tsedeke Yihune Construction, the company changed its name Flintstone Engineering in 2009.

Flintstone Homes owned over five thousand houses including shops to customers.

== History ==
Flintstone Homes was founded in 2008 by Flintstone Engineering S.C.O, formerly known as Tsedeke Yihune Construction, which was established in 1992 by engineer Tsedeke Yihune. In 2009, it was called "Flintstone Engineering". Flintstone Homes owned over five thousand houses including shops to customers. As of May 2023, the company had 3,500 houses under construction and about 6,500 houses pending completion for market offer. About 10,000 houses will be projected for customers.

In 2024, Flintstone Homes gained 829 million birr in revenue, with 16% improvement from past year. In December 2024, its profit skyrocketed into 84%.

== See also ==
- Housing in Ethiopia
