= Federal Government Employees Housing Authority =

Housing Authority of the Government of Pakistan

- فیڈرل گورنمنٹ ایمپلائز ہاؤسنگ اتھارٹی
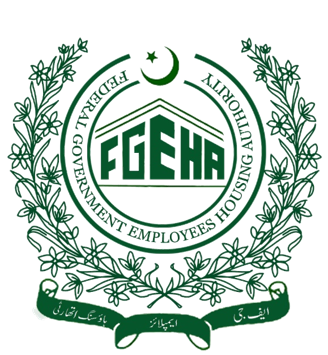
- Headquarters: 10 Mauve Area, G-10/4 Islamabad
- Chairman Executive Board: Mian Riaz Hussain Pirzada
- Director General: Capt. (Retd.) Muhammad Zafar Iqbal
- Website: http://www.fgeha.gov.pk/

Federal Government Employee Housing Authority (FGEHA) provides eligible Federal Government employees with quality affordable housing in major cities of Pakistan in a secure, healthy, and decent environment. Also working in partnership with the public and private sectors, the FGEHA provides families with housing choices and opportunities. The Federal Minister for Housing & Works, Riaz Hussain Pirzada is the Chairman of FGEHA Executive Board. The Director General of FGEHA is Capt.(R) Muhammad Zafar Iqbal.

== History ==
Federal Government Employee Housing Authority (earlier FGE Housing) Foundation) was established as a cell in Ministry of Housing & Works in 1989. Later on, it was registered with the Security and Exchange Commission of Pakistan as a Public Limited Company on 26 March 1990 under Companies Ordinance, 1984. The erstwhile FG Employees Housing Foundation has been established as Federal Government Employees Housing Authority through Ordinance promulgated on 12 July 2019 by the President. Later on, the Federal Government Employees Housing Authority Act was passed through Parliament on 15 January 2020.

== Objectives ==
To initiate, launch, sponsor and implement Housing Schemes for Federal Government Employees serving and retired and for other specified groups of people as decided by the Authority from time to time on an ownership basis in Islamabad, the Provincial Capitals, and other major cities of Pakistan.
