= Housing in Europe =

Housing in Europe includes modern and traditional styles.

== Data from 2015 ==
In 2015, more than 4 out of every 10 persons (42.0%) in the EU-28 lived in flats, close to one quarter (24.1%) in semi-detached houses and one third (33.3%) in detached houses. The proportion of people living in flats was highest, among the EU Member States, in Spain (65.9%), Latvia (65.0%) and Estonia (62.6%), while the highest proportions of people living in semi-detached houses were reported in the Netherlands, the United Kingdom (both 59.9%) and Ireland (51.6%); these were the only Member States where more than half of the population lived in a semi-detached house. The share of people living in detached houses peaked in Croatia (73.4%), Slovenia (65.1%), Hungary (62.1%) and Romania (60.1%); Serbia (66.1%) and Norway (61.2%) also reported that more than 6 out of every 10 persons in of their population were living in detached houses.

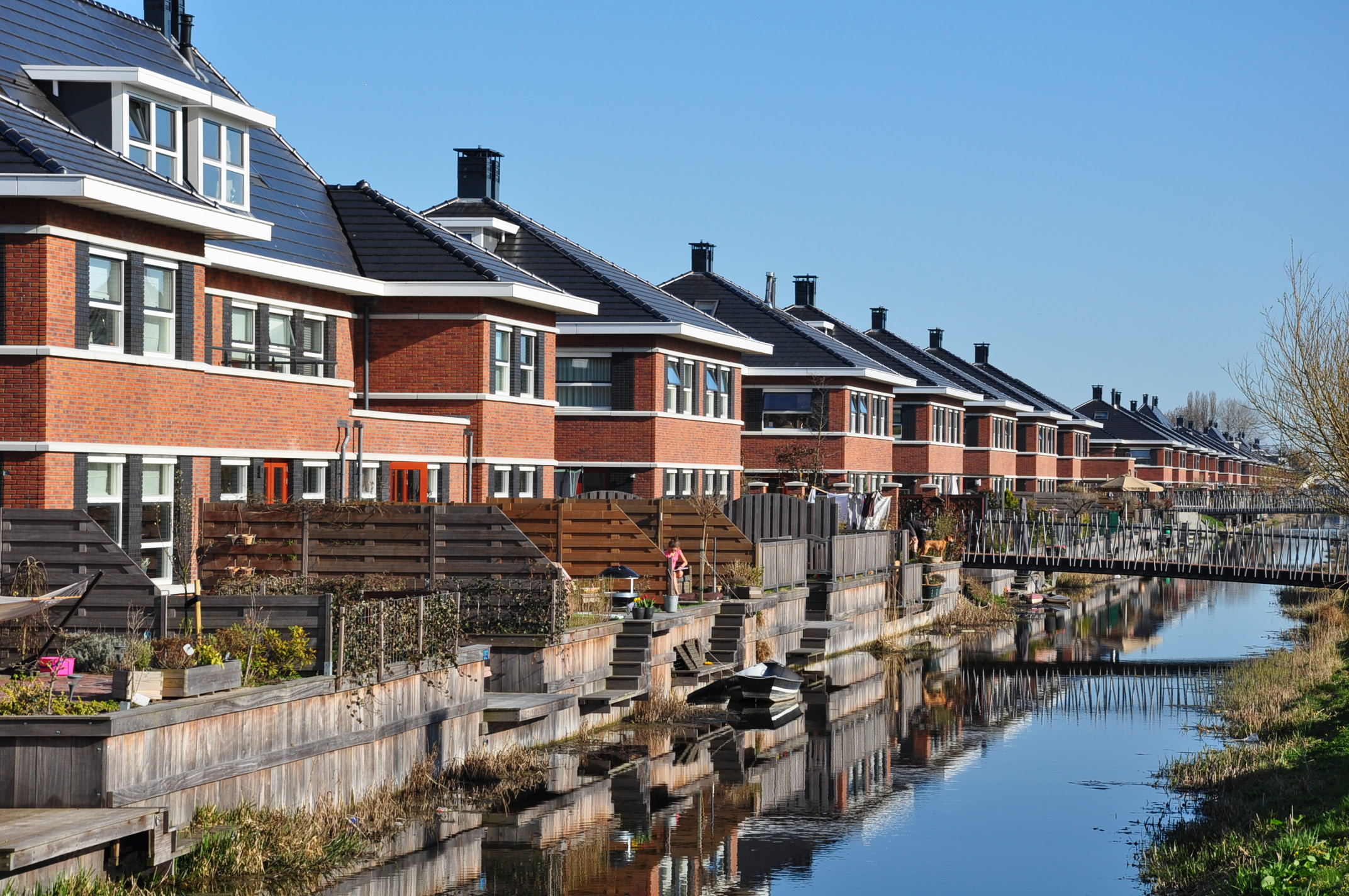
Twin houses in The Hague, Netherlands

Since 2010, the percentage of those living in detached houses across the EU 27 has remained stable, with the percentage of those living in detached houses remaining in the range of 34.5% to 35.8%. The only region of Europe with a distinctive trend is the Nordic countries, where the percentage of those living in detached houses is in steady decline. The percentage of those living in detached houses in Norway, Denmark, Sweden, and Iceland, fell from 63%, 59%, 48%, and 36% to 58%, 54%, 44%, and 32% respectively. The only Nordic country resistant to this trend is Finland, where the percentage of those living in detached houses has remained stable in the 47.6% to 46.1% range.

In the period of 2010 to 2018, the country in the EU 27 with the greatest percent decrease in those living in detached houses was Luxembourg, with a decrease from 43.3% to 34.7%. The greatest percentage increase was in Romania, where the percentage of those living in detached houses increased from 60.8% to 65.2%.

country	detached houses	semi-detached or terraced houses	flats	owning	renting	free accommodation
EU-28 (2015) average	33.3%	24.1%	42%	69.4%	19.7%	10.9%
Belgium	36%	39%	25%	67%	31%	2%
Czech Republic	39%	10%	56%	72%	24%	4%
Denmark	53%	15%	38%	58%	42%	-
Germany	26%	13%	62%	46%	52%	3%
Estonia	34%	4%	69%	83%	8%	10%
Ireland	40%	55%	4%	77%	21%	1%
Greece	32%	10%	55%	73%	21%	6%
Spain	13%	19%	66%	83%	11%	7%
France	42%	20%	41%	58%	38%	4%
Italy	23%	19%	53%	72%	19%	10%
Cyprus	44%	29%	25%	66%	13%	20%
Latvia	31%	5%	72%	84%	13%	4%
Lithuania	35%	9%	59%	89%	3%	7%
Luxembourg	35%	30%	33%	71%	26%	3%
Hungary	65%	8%	35%	87%	7%	6%
Malta	5%	49%	46%	77%	21%	3%
Netherlands	17%	55%	26%	56%	43%	-
Austria	45%	12%	48%	52%	41%	7%
Poland	50%	5%	55%	58%	38%	4%
Portugal	37%	23%	38%	73%	19%	9%
Romania	65%	3%	41%	96%	2%	2%
Slovenia	66%	4%	31%	80%	8%	12%
Slovakia	50%	2%	53%	89%	10%	2%
Finland	46%	19%	43%	67%	32%	1%
Sweden	44%	7%	51%	62%	38%	-
United Kingdom	24%	59%	18%	71%	27%	1%
Iceland	32%	15%	51%	83%	16%	2%
Norway	58%	19%	11%	78%	20%	3%
Switzerland (2009)	25%	14%	58%	37%	60%	-

== Lack of affordable housing ==
In Europe, there is also a significant shortage of investment in social housing and a pressing need to renovate existing units. Annual investment in housing is predicted at €57 billion for new building and energy-efficiency modifications. The projections do not include the refugee situation caused by the Russian invasion of Ukraine.

=== Funding ===
In both Sweden and Poland, there is a dramatically increasing demand for affordable housing in mid-size cities. Sweden is

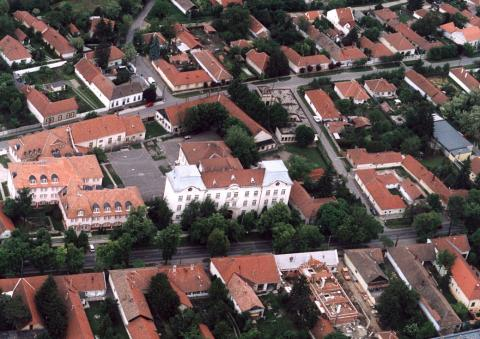
Suburban housing in Békés, Hungary

building thousands of affordable rental homes with near-zero energy use and the highest efficiency standards, the European Investment Bank approved a nearly €300 million loan in September 2019 to support this work. In the Polish city of Poznań, many residents do not qualify for city-supported affordable housing due to their high incomes but are unable to buy a home in the regular market because of low credit rating. The city and a local housing company began a project for these residents to build more than 1,000 flats that also have a kindergarten, day-care centre, a playground and parking spaces for people with disabilities. The European Investment Bank provided a €34 million loan for this project.

In Tallinn, a recently established network of 19 European communities are aiming to raise the standard of living for their population while lessening their environmental footprint. The city is receiving a €100 million loan as support from the European Investment Bank, in order to upgrade public spaces, schools, social housing and energy efficient measures.

In 2022, Polish bank BGK will get a €133 million loan to help fund social and affordable homes across the country. The project is set to produce 5,000 new and 500 restored housing units across Poland, with the majority located in cohesion regions.

The EIB also took part in a €120 million public-private partnership agreement to create over 500 affordable housing units in Ireland.

From 2015 to 2023, housing prices in the European Union surged by 48%, while rents went up by 13%, making housing costs a significant burden, particularly in regional capitals and smaller cities.

The highest increases in house prices were observed in Hungary (196%), Lithuania (114%), and Czechia (112%), with the most significant rent hikes occurring in Lithuania (68%), Estonia (59%), and Poland (58%).

Across all regions, 45% of households, and over two-thirds of municipalities in less developed regions, indicate a shortage of investment in social housing, exacerbating the already strained housing markets.

=== Germany ===
Germany provides several business tax incentives for local government in housing development. These incentives are designed to attract investors and promote the construction of affordable social housing in urban areas. Some of them are:

- Reduced Corporate Tax Rate: Local governments in Germany can benefit from a reduced corporate tax rate of 15% for income obtained from rental housing development projects. This tax incentive is applicable to all income generated from the project, including rent, interest, and capital gains.
- Depreciation Deduction: Local governments can similarly benefit from a depreciation deduction for the buildings constructed under the housing development project. This deduction can be claimed over a period of up to 50 years, and is based on the construction costs incurred by the local government.
- Capital Gains Exemption: Local governments can also benefit from capital gains tax exemptions if they sell the housing units constructed under the housing development project, after a certain period of time. The period varies from state to state, but is typically around 10 years.

== Energy efficiency ==
There is a shortage of energy-efficient homes in Europe, the issue is especially bad in many urban areas, where 70% of the EU's population lives. Almost half of all European residential buildings were constructed pre-1970, when energy consumption in materials, standards and techniques was not considered. The European Commission found that 75% of buildings and housing need to be made more energy efficient to meet climate goals.

== See also ==
- Political Economy of Real Estate
