= Housing in Barbuda =

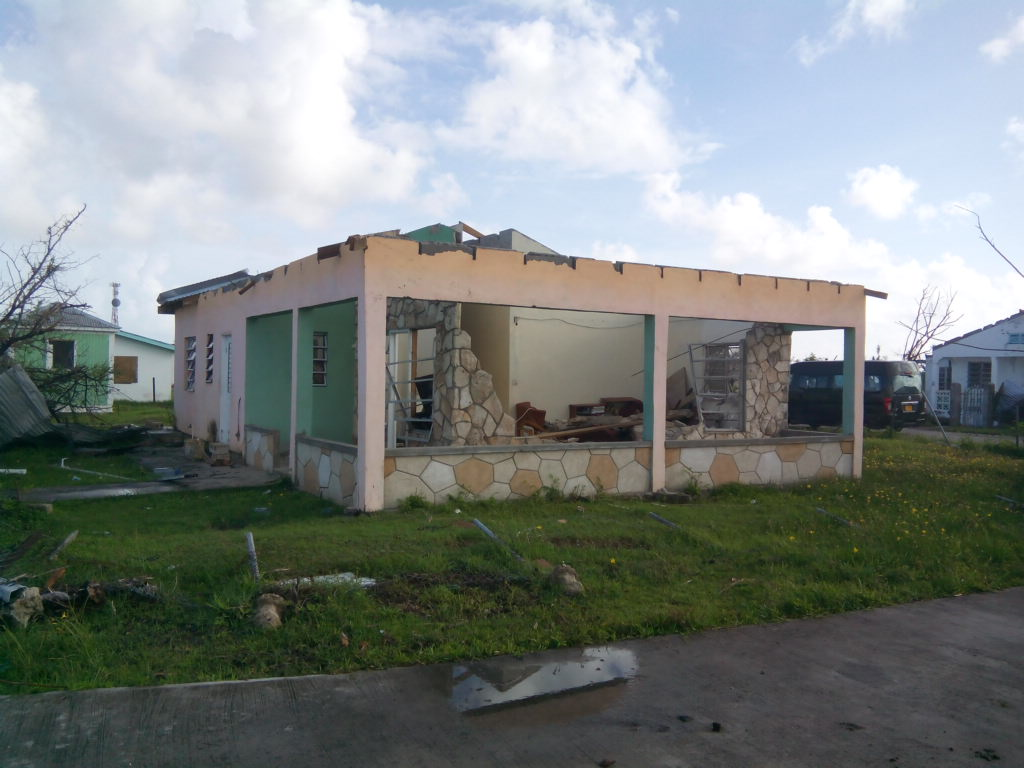
A house in Barbuda destroyed by Hurricane Irma.

On the island of Barbuda, which is part of the nation of Antigua and Barbuda, the housing industry is a major economic sector. The majority of households, or 68.38% of all households, are owner-occupied homes.

== Housing statistics ==
Barbuda has a total of 545 households as of the time of the Population and Housing Census that was conducted in 2011. 0.73% of housing units are owned with a mortgage, while 67.52% of housing units are owned outright. 6.24% of housing units are rent free, and 24.95% of housing units are rented privately. The remaining 0.37% of housing units are leased, rented from the government, squatted, or some other type of arrangement. Only 0.18% of homes had residents who were unaware of the type of ownership their home was under.

In Barbuda, 34.31% of homes contained only one person, 18.35% of households contained two people, 16.51% of households contained three people, 8.99% of households contained four people, 9.17% of households contained five people, and the remaining households contained at least six people.

== Utilities and appliances statistics ==
=== Outer wall materials ===
4.22% of housing units have concrete as the primary material of the outer walls, 72.84% of housing units had concrete or blocks as the primary material of the outer walls, 12.48% of housing units had wood, 0.55% of housing units had wood and brick, 7.52% of housing units had wood and concrete, and 2.39% of housing units had other materials, such as improvised materials, stone, stone and brick, etc.

=== Air conditioning ===
Only 11.01% of homes in Barbuda are equipped with air conditioning, while the rest 88.99% do not have this luxury. In Barbuda, there is a significant gap between those who own and those who do not own air conditioners. 89.85% of African Barbudans live in households where there is no access to air conditioning.

This can be contrasted with the percentage of White Barbudans who do not have access to air conditioning, which is 50%, 0% for Indian Barbudans, 97.83% for Mixed Black/White people, 68.75% for Mixed (Other) people, 57.14% for Hispanic people, and 100% for Syrian/Lebanese people.

=== Main roofing material ===
93.76% of Barbudan households use sheet metal as the primary roofing material. 2.02% of Barbudan households use concrete as their primary roofing material. 0.55% of Barbudan households use asphalt shingles. 0.37% of Barbudan households use various types of shingles. 3.12% of Barbudan households use wood shingles. 0.18% of Barbudan households use alternative methods, such as makeshift, tarpaulin, tile, etc.

In contrast to the majority of the rest of the country, there is not a significant ethnic divide in the choice of roofing material in Barbuda. Sheet metal is the primary roofing material for the homes of 95.98% of African Barbudans, 100% of White Barbudans, 100% of Indian Barbudans, 86.96% of Mixed Black/White Barbudans, 93.75% of other Mixed Barbudans, 100% of Hispanic Barbudans, and 50% of Syrian/Lebanese Barbudans.
