= Housing in Azerbaijan =

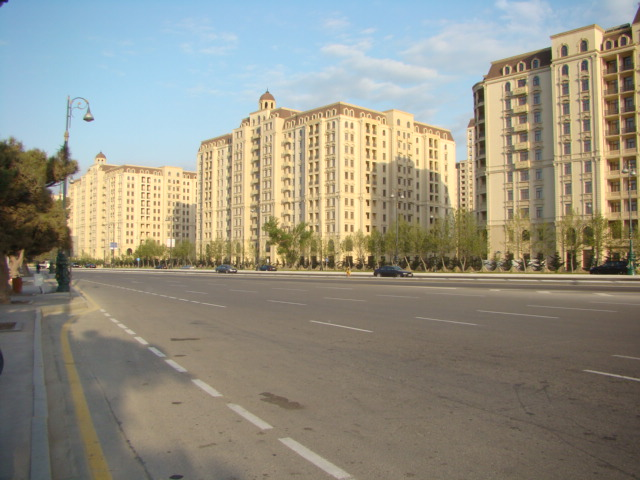
New residential buildings in Baku

Housing in Azerbaijan is characterized by high rates of private housing ownership. Construction in housing industry started to improve in the late 1990s, as the result of the Presidential decree (1997), which eliminated the state monopoly of the construction sector.

== Types of housing ==
Two types of residence are predominant in Azerbaijan: the single-family detached home and multi-family residential. Additional kinds of housing include dormitories, communal apartments, and summerhouses. Housing stock of Azerbaijan is divided into 2 groups as existing and recently built. Existing houses are also classified by the period of their construction:

- Housing properties built prior 1920s – they are situated mostly in the historical parts of cities. This type of estates requires reconstruction and renovation in order to meet present-day housing standards;
- Housing properties constructed before World War 2 – in 1920-1940 – they are situated mostly in rural areas. Kitchens and bathrooms of this type of houses built in urban areas are shared.
- Housing properties built after World War 2 – in the 1960s construction of prefabricated houses increased and new districts were planned to be filled with this type of houses.
- Housing properties built after gaining independence. Due to social-economic, political situation of the country, construction of houses decreased in 1990s. During this period, cottage-type private properties were built mostly. Building multifamily complexes in the larger cities became more widespread after 2000.

== Housing construction ==
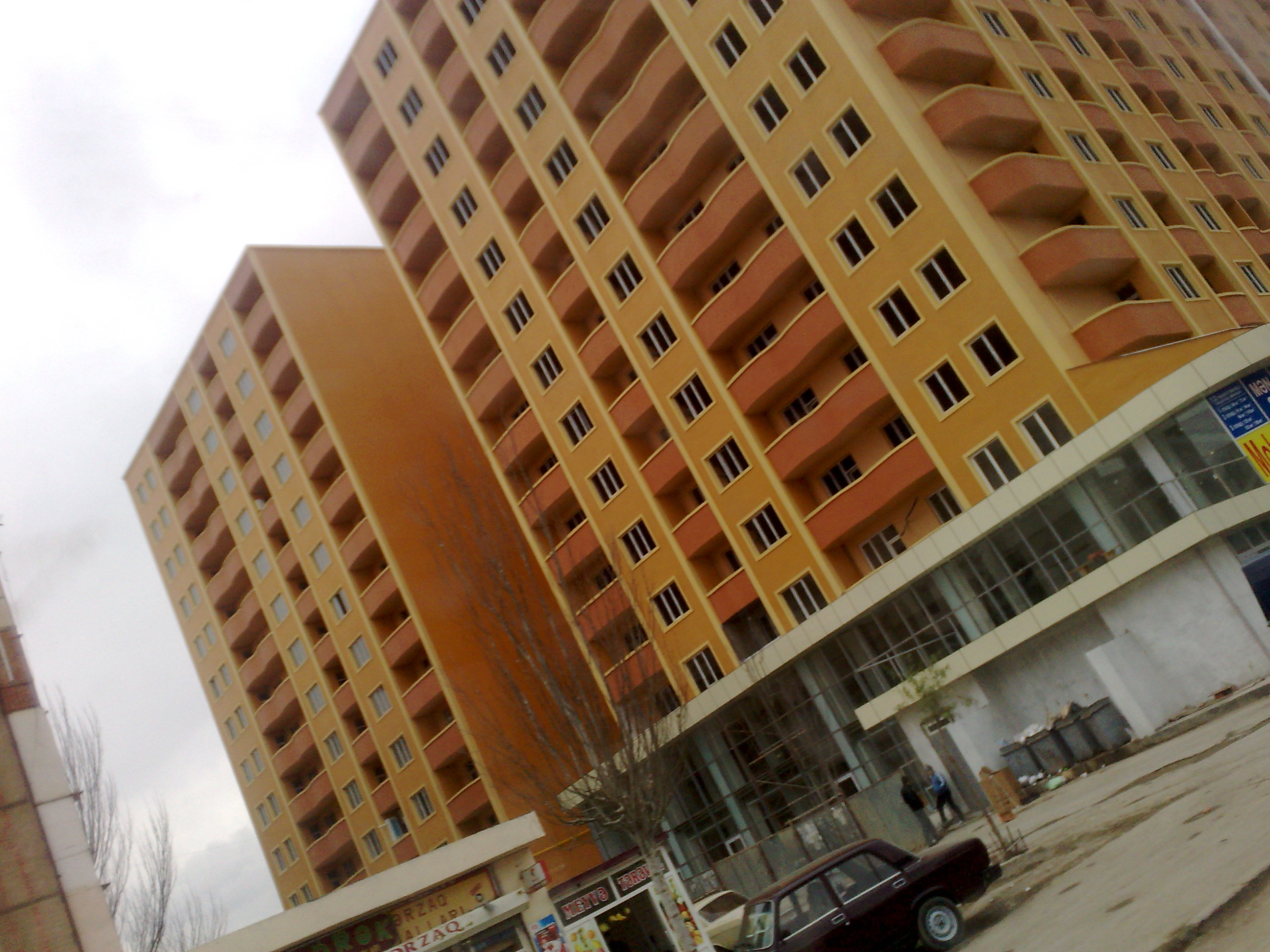
Multi-family apartments in Baku

Construction sector of the country improved significantly while the economy of the country was developing in early 2000s. Initially, construction process was going on rapidly in city centers and touristic areas throughout the country. Housing sector became one of the main parts in the economic development of Azerbaijan. Rising demand for modern new housing required development of multi-story apartment buildings. Consequently, many private companies constructing apartment buildings were formed and became the main supplier of commercial buildings. New projects for residential and non-residential buildings were increasing. In 2003, residential construction enjoyed a growth from 803,000 square meters in 2002 to 1339 million square meters in new house construction. The average figure for 2003-2008 was 1 million square meters.

== Government agencies ==
Regulations and standards on construction required to be modified after Azerbaijan regained its independence, as previously they were applied throughout USSR without decently customized to local conditions. Therefore, several actions were taken to address this issue. Ministry of Housing and Communal Services of the Republic of Azerbaijan managed housing issues before 1993. Then, the Ministry was transformed into Committee of Housing and Communal Services under the Cabinet of Ministers of Azerbaijan in May 1993. The committee was eliminated and its functions was transferred to the State Committee for Construction and Architecture in 2001. It was abolished in 2006 and State Committee for City Building and Architecture was established instead of the previous agency in February 2006. In addition, State Agency of Control on Security in Construction and the Ministry of Emergency Situations was established on December 29, 2006.

The State Committee on Property Issues of the Republic of Azerbaijan was established according to the Decree of the President of the Republic of Azerbaijan on May 19, 2009. The Committee is the central executive organ exercising implementation state policy and regulation on real estate management and its privatization, as well as is responsible for involving investments, controlling use and protection of lands, and conducting state registration and cadaster of real estate in Azerbaijan.

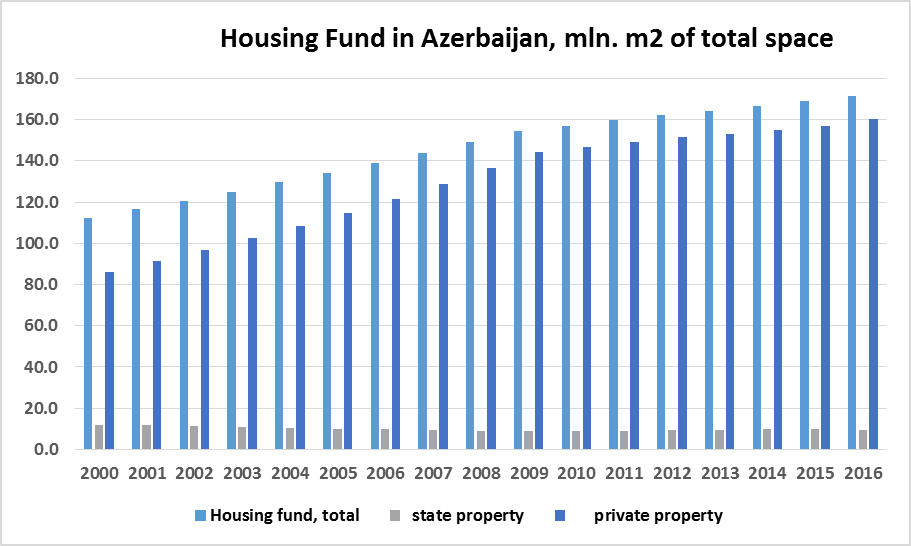
Housing conditions of the population, Housing Fund Data extracted from www.stat.gov.az

== Privatization ==
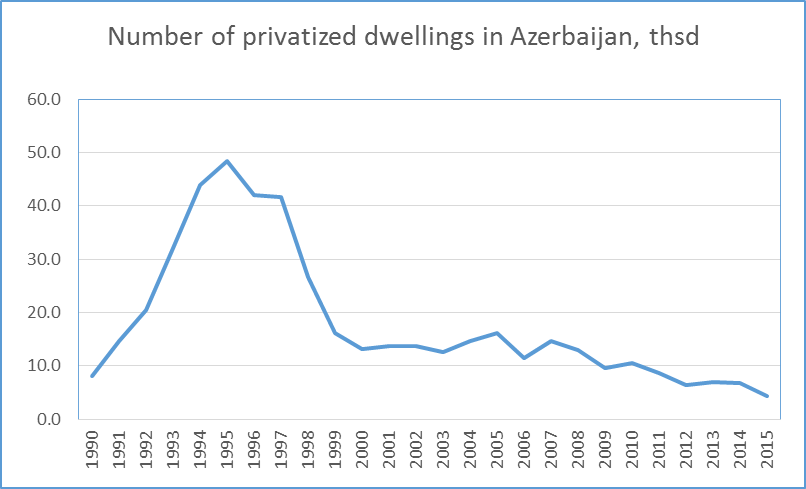
Housing conditions of the population, Privatization of housing fund Extracted www.stat.gov.az

In order to promote private ownership, the Government of Azerbaijan adopted the Law on Privatization of the Apartment Stock in 1993, The State Program of Privatization in the Republic of Azerbaijan for 1995–1998, and The Second State Program on Privatization of State Property in the Republic of Azerbaijan in 2000. Privatization rate has increased to 85% of the entire housing stock until 2010. In comparison with early 1990s, privatization process is steady now. This law simplified the privatization process of flats and canceled the requirement of paying nominal value of the house for the privatization.

== Public housing ==
Social policy of the Government used to focus mainly on housing problems of certain vulnerable groups, as refugees, IDPs, the war disabled or injured. There are several government agencies that are dealing with this issue, like State Committee on Affairs of Refugees and IDPs, The Ministry of Social Protection, Mortgage Fund.

State Committee on Affairs of Refugees and IDPs are handling housing issues of specific susceptible groups, especially IDPs, whose number was 603251 (120650 families) in 2009. Most of IDPs live in roughly 360 collective centers of Baku and Sumgayit. These collective centers are generally overcrowded and does not meet the need of people living there, as there are problems with kitchen, individual bathrooms. That is why; the Government have started to establish new settlements for IDPs since 2000. More than 17000 IDP families were provided with houses in 61 newly constructed settlements between 2004 and 2008.

People injured during the conflict with Armenia, supported by the government have also been provided either with flats in multi-family residential buildings or with separate cottage-type houses.

Moreover, the Government promotes teaching in rural areas in order to fill the gap of schoolteachers in those areas. Small houses have been constructing as part of specific programs for teachers.

There is also an ongoing process to support young families who need better living conditions. In order to cover this issue, a specific section entitled “The improvement of living conditions for young families” was created in State Program in the Sector of Demography and Development of Population approved by the President of Azerbaijan in 2004. According to this program, responsible institutions were defined in order to create a system of discounted loans to make better the living conditions of young families in need.

Mortgage Fund under National Bank of Azerbaijan formed by the decree of the President, to develop living condition of population, create more effective housing finance mechanism, started to handle the allocation process of loans since 2005. The Fund offers mortgages as low as 4% interest to specific groups.

=== Company housing ===
A few Azerbaijani companies maintain their own apartment building for employees in need. For instance, SOCAR established "Neftchi" Housing Construction Cooperative in 2010 in order to improve housing conditions of its employees. Membership in this Cooperative is carried out based on the applications of the employees who have registered in SOCAR housing system. SOCAR reimburses some part of the cost of the house, and the rest is paid by the employee to the Cooperative.“Neftchi” Cooperative is also constructing new residential buildings, as one of the buildings was put into operation in 2016 in Khatai district of Baku.

Ministry of Communication and Information Technologies, and Azerbaijan Railways CJSC have also provided their employees with houses.

== Affordable housing ==
The State Agency for Housing Construction under the President of the Republic of Azerbaijan was established according to the Decree No. 858 on 11 April 2016 with the purpose to meet requirements of citizens in housing, improve their living conditions, and build multi-family residential. Besides, “MIDA” LLC has been established under State Agency for Housing Construction in order to promote the construction of multistoried residential buildings in the country and to ensure that the citizens are enjoying subsidized apartment sales, and to effectively use the funds allocated for the construction of multistoried residential buildings.

=== Projects ===
- Yasamal Residential Complex – the first project of the State Agency for Housing Construction is planned to build 29 multifamily apartments with 1843 flats on an area of 11.6 ha in Yasamal district of Baku. The construction process of the first building in the complex was started in December 2016 and is planned to be commissioned in summer 2018.
- Hovsan Residential Complex – in February 2017, an area of 20 ha in Surakhani region of Baku was allocated for constructing multifamily apartments based on the decree of Cabinet of Ministers. the construction process of the first building inn this complex started on 24 December 2017. The residential complex with 2962 apartments was inaugurated on March 24, 2020, by the President and vice-president of Azerbaijan.

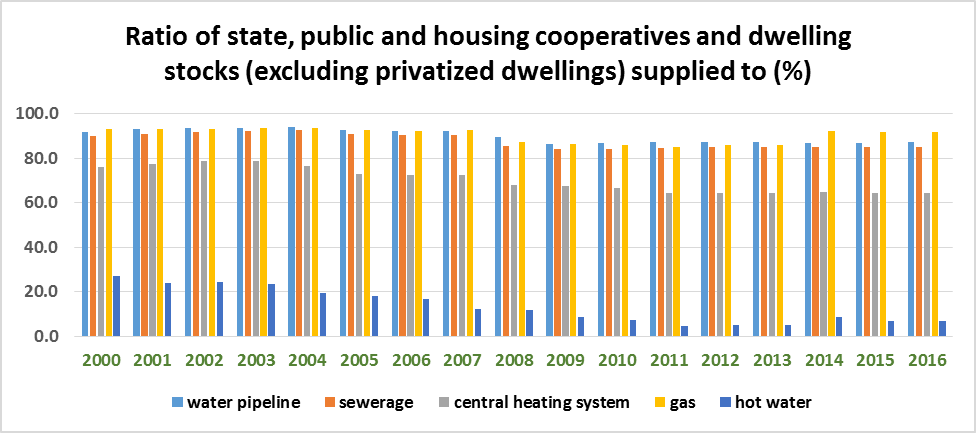
Housing conditions of the population, Improvement of the housing fund Data extracted from www.stat.gov.az

== Utilities ==
Local governments are responsible for providing utilities in buildings. Suppliers of electricity, gas and sanitation are state companies, while waste management is provided by either public or private companies. In order to improve the quality of utilities, Asian Development Bank, as well as the World Bank was involved in supplying water and sanitation services.

== See also ==
State Property Issues Committee (Azerbaijan)
