= Housing in Ethiopia =

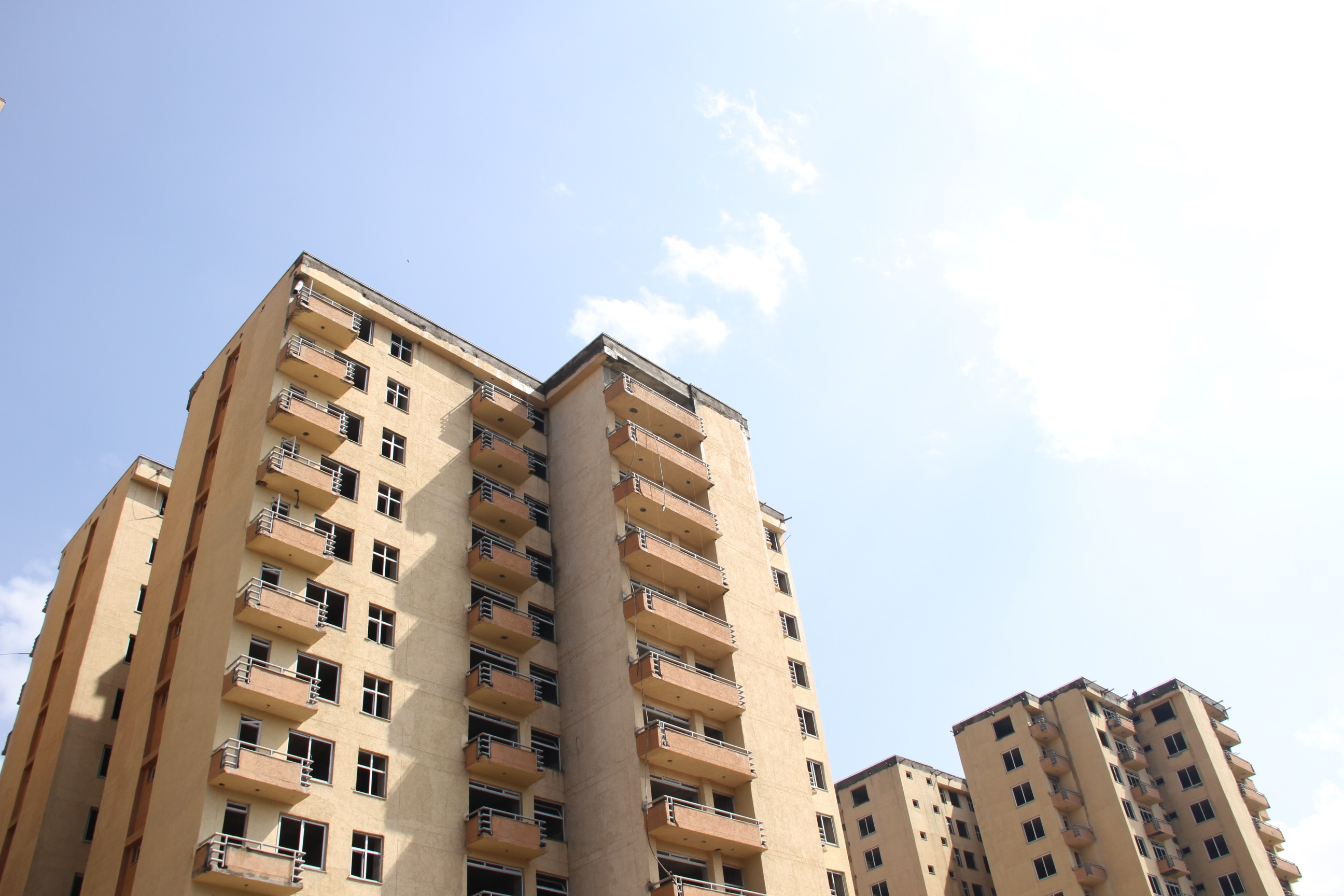
Apartments in Senga Tera, Addis Ababa

Housing in Ethiopia has been improving over past decades. About 70% of housing units are requiring total replacement whereas 30% are in fair condition. 20–27% are in adequate sanitation and 19.4% in rural areas at national level. However, there are still slum areas particularly in Addis Ababa where 80% of areas experienced sanitation problem and health and safety risks.

The Human Rights Measurement Initiative finds that Ethiopia is fulfilling 18.9% of what it should be fulfilling for the right to housing based on its level of income.

Since 2005, condominium housing program has been nourish public demand with low- and middle-income and promotes enterprises. The government able to address structural problem and planned five phase of condominium construction. Between 2004 and 2011, 453,283 people were registered in Addis Ababa. The Integrated Housing Development Programme (IHIP) built 400,000 units in 12 years. With private–public partnership, financial burden has been alleviate on the public sector through legal, institutional and regulatory framework.

== Overview ==
Current urban housing stocks needs urge steps – both support the resident well-being and create sustainable cities. About 70% of housing units are requiring total replacement whereas 30% is in fair condition. 20–27% are in adequate sanitation and 19.4% in rural areas at national level. 43% of household use pit latrines without slab or open pit and 38% have not obtain toilet facility. According to UNICEF report in 2011, safety for drinking water covered 51% whereas 39% in rural areas. 80% of Addis Ababa areas are facing sanitation problem where families in crowded rooms are exposed to health and safety risks.

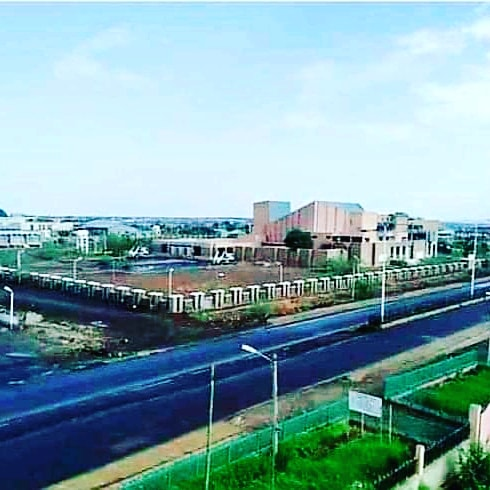
Street in Semera

Ethiopia historically made some changes of high and raising urban housing demand, through provision of condominium ownership that incurred unsustainable high cost totaling an estimated US$9 billion. This has implemented the Integrated Housing Development Programme (IHIP), which built nearly 400,000 units in 12 years. The private–public partnership afforded rental housing that would alleviate the financial burden on the public sector through legal, institutional and regulatory framework.

== Condominium housing ==
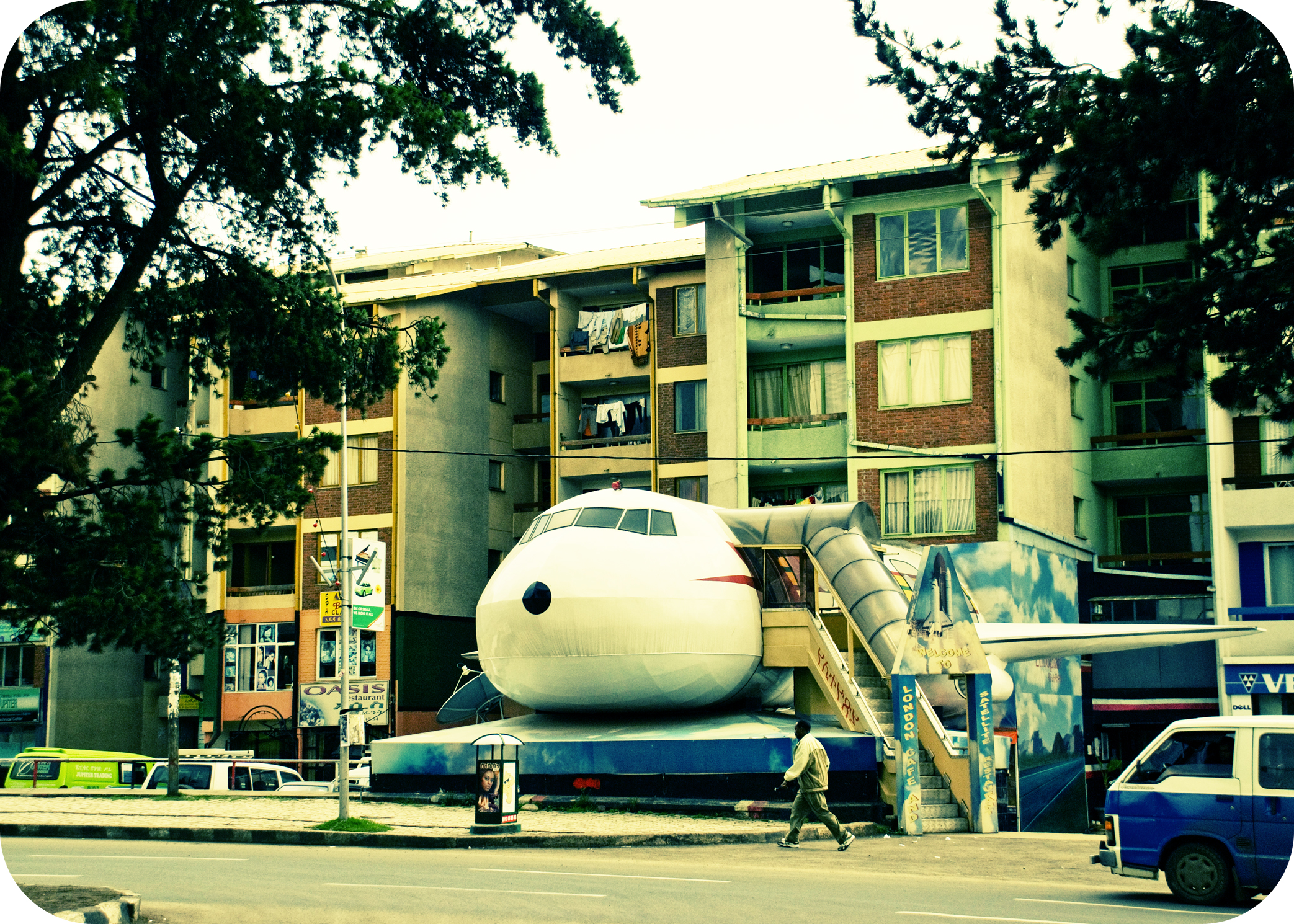
Condominium in Addis Ababa

In 2005, Ethiopia initiated condominium allotment for people who are in low-and middle-income people to create job opportunities and promotes enterprises. The first pilot condominium testing began in Addis Ababa at Bole sub-city between the year 2003 and 2005. In later years, the government borrowed funds from Commercial Bank of Ethiopia and constructed subsidized condominium houses in Addis Ababa and selected towns.

This was followed by finance and land supply, capacity building, bulk purchase of industrial products and construction materials, organized medium, small enterprises, standardizing housing, and introducing new construction technology that minimize cost and time. The government firstly aimed for people with low- and -middle income and then to economize urban land through empty open space and renewing decayed areas and vertical increment of units by constructing G+2 to G+4 condominium houses. The third phase was to provide ideal cost and the fourth was to reduce poverty and unemployment for people.

However such reforms have been viewed by some authors "trading privacy for location". Between 2004 and 2011, 453,287 people were registered in Addis Ababa; the number of people who registered for two and three bedrooms were 102,287 (23%), 20,1969 (44%), 11,8241 (26%) and 30,790 (7%) respectively. According project plan of housing development office, 50,000 units were constructed to fulfill 453,287 demands within seven years, but only 80,287 were supposed to be constructed within one or one and half year. Nevertheless, 17.7% demands were met and additional 372,460 demand would be met for the next 32 years.

There was also high deficit due to probable low supply of houses. For example, one bedroom units have 171,602 deficit. This means 171,602 are pending without response during the six round of distribution and the third phase of construction. Within Bole sub city alone, Japan Embassy, International Stadium, Adwa Park, and Bole ring road, there were 26, 65, 15, 31, 3, 6, and 1 vacant unit respectively.

== Housing affordability in Ethiopian context ==
In Organization for Economic Co-operation and Development (OECD), affordable housing is typically measured to the proportional housing population expenditure that does not exceed 30% of disposable income (over 40% is deemed a burden by the OECD). In Ethiopian context, affordable housing relatively appeared at the first glance on expenditure on "housing (rent), water, electricity and gas" accounting around 19% of annual expenditure for households across all consumption quintiles.

However, the Ethiopian context is different so far by further scrutiny, which regard of expenditure category. For instance, according to OECD, 14% housing expenditure on average is on "food and non-alcoholic beverages", more than 54% of total expenditure for fully 80%.

== List of real estates ==
Name	Location	Year established	Ref.
Ayat Real Estate	Addis Ababa	1997	
Tsehay Real Estate	Addis Ababa	2011	
Noah Real Estate	Addis Ababa	2013	
Sunshine Investment Group	Addis Ababa	1983	
GIFT Real Estate	Addis Ababa	2005	
Metropolitan Real Estate	Addis Ababa	1995	
Flintstone Homes	Addis Ababa	2008	
