= Housing in Senegal =

Senegal’s high population growth and migration from the rural areas to Dakar has resulted in the mushrooming of squatter settlements on Dakar’s periphery.

== Housing affordability ==
Further, the high costs of construction materials – imported for the most part – combined with prohibitive interest rates – in the range of 8-10% according to BHS, the housing bank – have made housing too expensive for the average Senegalese and for low-income families. As a result, there is a critical shortage of affordable housing, and the Government has estimated at 120,000 the number of units to be built every year in order to meet a growing demand.

Under President Abdoulaye Wade’s initiative “one family-one home”, a battery of incentives has been presented to potential homebuilders, as long as the cost of the house does not exceed CFA Franc 7 million ($15,500). They range from providing free land to homebuilders, a 3.3% subsidy to the target buyers of the houses, and tax holidays for imported construction equipment.
