= Housing insecurity =

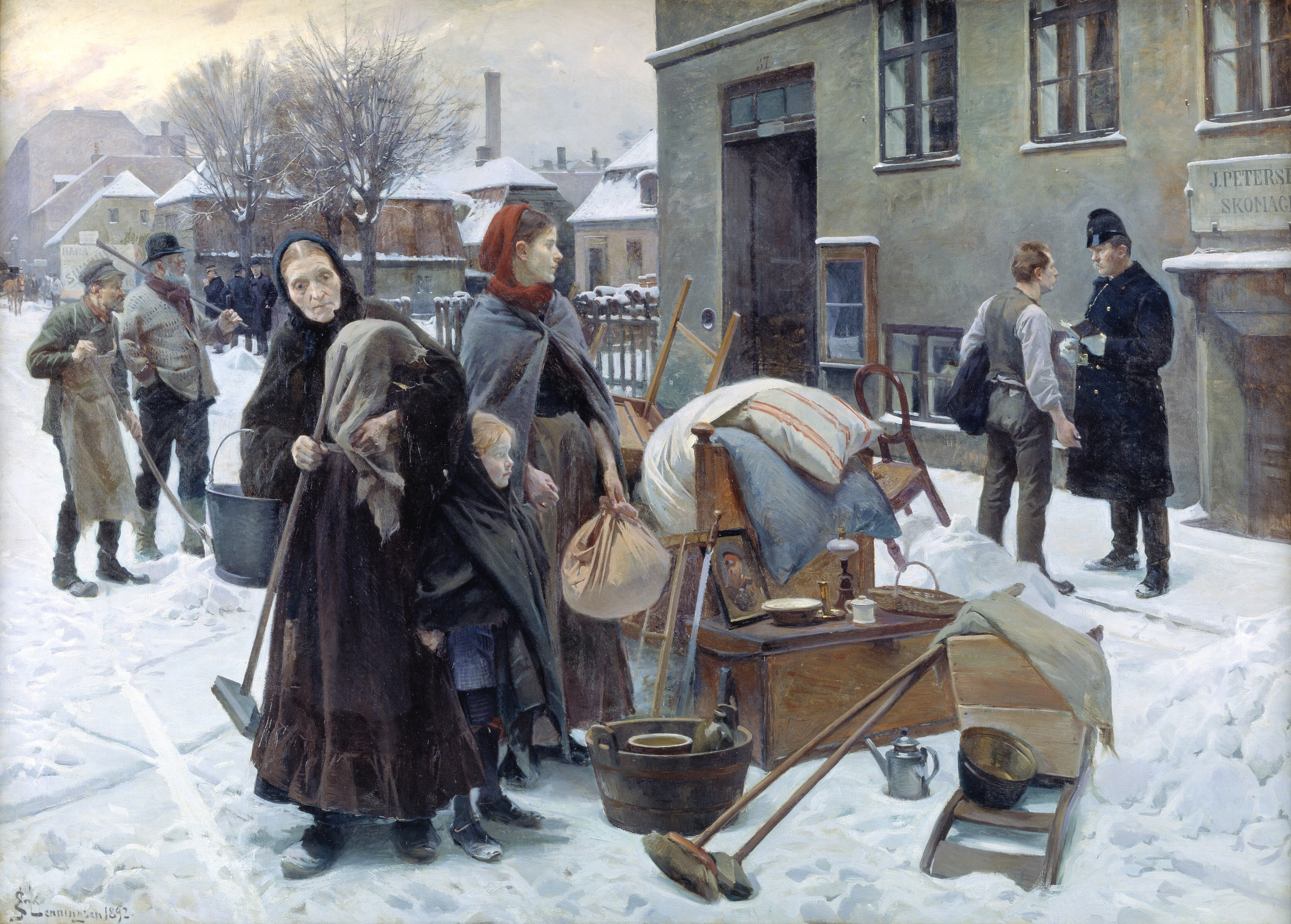
Erik Henningsen's painting Eviction held by the National Gallery of Denmark.1892

Housing insecurity is the condition of lacking stable, safe, and affordable housing without being entirely homeless. Housing insecurity is associated with worse health outcomes and can be alleviated by increasing the housing supply, for example loosening zoning regulations.

== Definition ==
Housing insecurity is defined as a precariousness regarding one's housing conditions, often including some or all of the following:

- difficulty acquiring and keeping housing tenure
- being required to spend a high percentage of income on housing costs
- living in housing that is unsafe, unsanitary, or lacking in basic necessities
- living in housing that is overcrowded or overcapacity
- living with a domestic abuser, such as an abusive partner, parent, or guardian
- being at risk of involuntary relocation, or being forced to relocate multiple times

== Background ==
=== High rent cost burden ===
United States Department of Housing and Urban Development uses the terms "cost burdened" and "severely cost burdened" to describe individuals or families that spend more than 30% and 50% of their income on housing costs, respectively. According to the 2020 U.S. census, 46% of American renters are cost burdened, with 23% severely cost burdened.

One out of five in the United States who earn less than $25,000 per year have fallen behind on rent.

Research on college students in the United States has found that housing insecurity has become increasingly common due to rising housing and living costs near universities. A 2020 study reported that more than 45% of college students experience some form of housing insecurity, including difficulty paying rent, overcrowding, or temporary homelessness.

Evidence from multiple fields of harmful effects from housing affordability constraints on parents’ mental health, children's cognitive functioning, and on child misbehaviour.

=== Low-quality and unsafe housing ===
Landlords may also fail housing quality standards inspections by neglecting to repair and maintain their property as required.

An estimated 15% of rental units in the United States (over five million) have significant quality and safety issues (such as crumbling walls and vermin infestation) or lacked residential essentials, like heating equipment or running water. Consistent exposure to unsafe housing (e.g. dampness, poor ventilation, and unhygienic conditions) can lead to an increase in mold and other allergens that develop and aggravate respiratory diseases like asthma, the most common chronic health problem among children Broader hazard issues such as fire-risks and unsafe structures, can lead to fires or collapses causing injuries, and render a housing unit uninhabitable or condemned.

Despite lead paint having been banned in the United States in the 1970s, lead paint is still present in some houses and lead poisoning (which has negative effects on children's cognitive development and executive function) is a particularly prevalent issue in low-income, majority-minority neighborhoods.

Over-crowded housing can affect sleep, privacy, and adequate study space, as well as increasing risk of infection.

=== Discrimination ===
Housing discrimination refers to patterns of discrimination that affect a person's ability to rent or buy housing. This disparate treatment of a person on the housing market can be based on group characteristics or on the place where a person lives.

The most straightforward form of housing discrimination involves a landlord who rejects offers from potential tenants based on factors such as race, age, gender, marital status, source of funding, and others. The landlord may perform the discrimination explicitly or implicitly. Housing discrimination can also occur among existing tenants, who may face detrimental treatment in comparison to others for the same reasons. Housing discrimination can lead to spatial inequality and racial segregation, which, in turn, can exacerbate wealth disparities between certain groups.

==== By financial credit ====
In the United States it's common for landlords to discriminate according to potential renters by their credit score. People with poor or no credit are much more likely to get rejected when applying for a property.Landlords who don't discriminate based on credit score often rent out poorer quality houses.This issue is compounded by other forms of discrimination as marginalised people are more likely to suffer low credit.Additionally eviction can lead to a lower credit rating, thus risking a negative feedback loop.

=== Covid-19 pandemic ===
In the United Kingdom, the COVID-19 pandemic exaserbated housing insecurity due to increased financial pressures due to employment precarity, reduction in informal accommodation due to isolation, and increased overcrowding issues. During the pandemic, there was a temporary ban on bailiff-enforced evictions, while housing rights organisations lobbied for more prolonged efforts in helping people with overdue rent. The Joseph Rowntree Foundation (JRF), warned of two-tier economic recovery from pandemic in which renters would be more at risk of long-term housing insecurity compared to homeowners. JRF also found that ethnic minorities, and low-income, and households with children have been most affected by pandemic debt and rent arrears.

In the United States, the country's Federal government, as well as some US States enacted temporary bans on eviction during the pandemic.

=== Domestic abuse ===
Victims of domestic abuse are at an increased risk of housing insecurity. Likewise, those who have attempted to flee abuse situations are at increased risk of having to return to an abusive household due to housing insecurity.

In England during 2022, over ten-thousand women fleeing abusive relationships were refused safe housing provisions.

== See also ==
- Housing crisis
- Homelessness
- Food insecurity
- Cost-of-living crisis
- Revenge eviction
