= Annual Homeless Assessment Report to Congress =

Perhaps the most accurate and current data on homelessness in the United States is reported annually by the Department of Housing and Urban Development (HUD) in the Annual Homeless Assessment Report to Congress (AHAR). The AHAR report relies on data from two sources: single-night, point-in-time counts of both sheltered and unsheltered homeless populations reported on the Continuum of Care applications to HUD; and counts of the sheltered homeless population over a full year provided by a sample of communities based on data in their local Homeless Management Information Systems (HMIS).

== Sample results from the 2010 AHAR ==
The sixth report to Congress, the 2010 AHAR, released in July 2011, reports the following household and demographic information for people that had accessed emergency shelters and transitional housing between October 2009 and September 2010, based on a sampling of HMIS data:

=== Total number ===
About 1.59 million people were homeless in emergency shelters or transitional housing at some point during the year between October 1, 2009, and September 30, 2010. The nation's sheltered homeless population over a year's time included approximately 1,092,600 individuals (68 percent) and 516,700 persons in families (32 percent). A family is a household that includes an adult 18 years of age or older and at least one child. All other sheltered homeless people are considered individuals.

=== Ethnicity ===
- 83.6% are Non-Hispanic/Non-Latino
- 16.4% are Hispanic/Latino

=== Race ===
- 41.6% are White, non-Hispanic/Latino
- 9.7% are White, Hispanic/Latino
- 37.0% are Black or African American
- 4.5% Other Single Race
- 7.2% Multiple Races

=== Age ===
- 21.8% Under age 18
- 23.5% are 18 to 30
- 37% are 31 to 50
- 14.9% are 51 to 61
- 2.8% are 62 and older

=== Household size ===
- 63.0% are in a 1-person household
- 10.1% are in a household of 2 people
- 10.4% are in a household of 3 people
- 8.1% are in a household of 4 people
- 8.4% are in a household of 5 or more people

=== Veteran status ===
- 11.6% are veterans
- 88.4% are not veterans

=== Disability status among adults ===
- 36.8% are disabled
- 63.2% are not disabled

=== Living arrangements prior entering the program ===
Already Homeless:

- 14.1% were in a place not meant for human habitation
- 25.0% were in emergency shelter

From 'Housing', newly homeless:

- 11.8% were in a rented or owned housing unit
- 17.6% were staying with family
- 12.6% were staying with friends

From Institutional Settings:

- 6.4% were in a psychiatric facility, substance abuse center or hospital (nonpsychiatric)
- 4.4% were in a jail, prison, or juvenile detention
- 0.2% were in a foster care home

Total Other:

- 7.9% were in a hotel or motel (no voucher)

=== Stability of previous night's living arrangement ===
- 20.6% stayed 1 week or less
- 15.4% stayed more than 1 week, but less than a month
- 21.6% stayed 1 to 3 months
- 16.0% stayed more than 3 months, but less than a year
- 26.4% stayed 1 year or longer

=== ZIP Code of last permanent address ===
- 62.5% came from the same jurisdiction as program location
- 37.6% came from a different jurisdiction than program location

The 2008 AHAR also reports the following counts and household information of sheltered and unsheltered homeless persons nationwide on a single night in January 2008, based on the Point-In-Time data collected as part of the 2008 Continuum of Care Application:

=== Total number ===
On a single night in January 2008, there were 664,414 sheltered and unsheltered homeless persons nationwide. Nearly 6 in 10 people who were homeless at a single point-in-time were in emergency shelters or transitional housing programs, while 42 percent were unsheltered on the "street" or in other places not meant for human habitation.

=== Homeless individuals ===
- 415,202 total individuals
- 49.3% are sheltered
- 50.7% are unsheltered

=== Homeless persons in families ===
- 249,212 total persons in families
- 72.8% are sheltered
- 27.2% are unsheltered

=== Chronically homeless ===
- 124,135 total chronically homeless persons
- 37% are sheltered
- 63% are unsheltered

=== Other sheltered subpopulations ===
- 34.7% are chronic substance abusers
- 26.2% are severely mentally ill
- 15.1% are veterans
- 12.3% are victims of domestic violence
- 3.9% are persons with HIV/AIDS (adults only)
- 1.1% are unaccompanied youth
