= Strata management =

Specialist area of property management

Strata management, sometimes known as "body corporate management", is a specialist area of property management involving the day-to-day operation and management of a property that is jointly owned and comprises multiple units, common areas and common facilities. It is derived from an Australian concept of property law called strata title applied to the administration of common ownership in apartment buildings on multiple levels, or strata. Emerging markets in Dubai, Abu Dhabi, the Philippines and India have adopted the Australian system. It is one of the fastest growing forms of housing in the United States today, similar to common-interest development (CID), a category that includes planned unit developments of single-family homes, known as homeowner associations (HOAs), condominiums, and cooperative apartments.

The successful management of such developments requires the establishment of a strata title system to provide a framework for ownership, and guidelines to manage developments with multiple users and owners.

Many jurisdictions adopt the concept of jointly owned property. Owners in these types of schemes automatically become members of an owners' or community association. These associations ultimately bear responsibility for the maintenance and management of common areas such as lobbies and corridors, and shared leisure facilities such as swimming pools and gyms. They are also responsible for running the administrative and financial aspects of the property.

The strata manager's role is to work with the owners' corporation and executive committee to successfully control, manage, maintain and administer the property and to create an appropriate community environment and includes tasks such as:

- General accounting
- Budgeting
- Invoicing of levies/service charges
- Arrears collections
- Financial reporting
- Contract management
- Meeting preparation
- Communication with property stakeholders
- Coordination of maintenance tasks
- Enforcement of rules/by-laws
- Issuance of notices, orders and certificates
- General secretarial tasks

== Body corporate fees ==
Body corporate fees (also called levies) are a mandatory part of strata living. These fees are payable to the body corporate or strata company managing the property, enabling them to take care of things such as insurance and maintenance of common areas.

=== Essention ===
If a home or investment property have a strata title or governed by a body corporate (under law, must be formed the body corporate or an owners' corporation and every unit owner must be given membership), some areas will be collective, and need funds for upkeep that must be paid every year. If these fees are not paid, single owners lose the right to vote on all matters that require an ordinary resolution. They can still attend meetings and vote on matters, if they require a special or unanimous resolution. The body corporate can award interest on delayed fees and may apply to the court for recovery unpaid money.

Body corporate fees cover everything from building insurance and maintaining common areas, through to shared utilities, building works and repairs. The total amount is budgeted each year, and then divided up between the unit owners.

In Australia, in a rental property the landlord may collect a body corporate fees as an outgoing in some circumstances. The retail leasing legislations vary in content across state/territory.

==== House maintenance costs ====
Stephen Raff wrote in his book, The Body Corporate Handbook: A Guide to Buying, Owning and Living in a Strata Scheme or Owners Corporation in Australia that the only difference between body corporate fees and house maintenance costs "is that if you have a house you will have a little more control over the timing of the expense."

=== Calculation ===
Body corporate fees for each year is budgeted, and then divided up between the unit owners. The fees calculated by the body corporate will be presented at AGM, and decided by a majority vote. The quarterly levies payable by each unit owner will then be calculated.

Body corporate fees depends on several factors such as the property's age (the older the property, the more fees will be needed), condition, maintenance, strata committee etc. For example, some properties have gyms, pools, tennis courts and barbecue areas, and that's the reason they have high body corporate fees. Also, Brendan Kelly and Simon Buckingham recommend buying houses that has a large land component, because houses wear out and depreciate over time while the land value of the property tends to go up. "Units and apartments are less likely to appreciate as much as house on land, and body corporate fees for units and apartments can add significantly to the costs of holding the property."

Some peoples ask the real estate agent to give them the previous few years’ body corporate fees for the apartment or unit etc. Also, the body corporate can contract with a body corporate manager to provide administrative assistance to the body corporate.

Body corporate fees are tax-deductible, but unit owners get back a percentage equal to their personal marginal rate of tax.

== Strata management in New South Wales, Australia ==
Strata management in New South Wales, Australia is currently governed by legislation including the Strata Schemes Management Act 1996 and the Strata Schemes Management Regulation 2010. However, in October 2015 the New South Wales Parliament passed the "Strata Schemes Management Act 2015" and the "Strata Schemes Development Act 2015" which largely replace the previous Acts governing strata management. Together, the Acts establish over 90 key reforms with the aim of simplifying strata laws. The majority of these reforms commenced on 30 November 2016. Some major changes include strengthening accountability of strata managers, quicker and simpler approval process for resolving disputes including renovation requests, tenant participation in meetings (scheme with over 50% tenants), electronic means for voting on motions, ability to fine unauthorised car parking, removing property developer's authority and influence in formulating Owners Corporation which can bind owners, guidelines to deal with construction defects, curbing practice of proxy farming.

All Schemes must review their current by-laws by 30 November 2017.

A strata scheme is a building, or collection of buildings, where individual each own a small portion known as a 'lot' but where there is also common property (e.g. external walls, windows, roofs, driveways, foyers, fences, lawns and gardens). Every owner shares the ownership of the common property. Strata schemes apply to residential developments, commercial, industrial, mixed use, hotel and retirement villages.

Lot owners own the inside of the unit but not the main structure of the building. Usually the four main walls, the ceiling and roof and the floor are common property. The dividing walls within the lot, floor coverings, and fixtures such as baths, toilet bowls and bench tops are all the property of the lot owner.

The key concept is that the lot owner effectively owns the airspace (and anything included in the airspace) inside the boundary walls, floor and ceiling of the lot. Airspace can extend to balconies and courtyards.

=== Key aspects of strata management ===
==== Inspection of records ====
Lot owners and prospective purchasers with written permission from a lot owner, can inspect the books and records of a strata scheme for a fee in accordance with section 108 of the Strata Schemes Management Act 1996. There are companies which specialise in inspecting the books and records and can organise a 'strata search' inspection.

Lot owners and prospective purchasers with written permission from a lot owner, can also request a certificate containing basic information about the strata scheme in accordance with section 109 of the Strata Schemes Management Act 1996, including the levies to be paid, outstanding levies and any special by-laws made by the owners corporation in the past two years.

==== Financial management ====
An owners corporation is responsible for the same type of expenses as a conventional householder. These include utilities, building insurance and repair and maintenance. To cover the costs of expenses, the law requires that each owners corporation establishes an administrative fund and a sinking fund and raises levies from owners in accordance with section 76 of the Strata Schemes Management Act 1996. All levies must be charged in proportion to the unit entitlements of each lot in accordance with section 78 of the Strata Schemes Management Act 1996. Levies must be decided at each annual general meeting.

The administrative fund is for day-to-day recurrent expenses, whereas the sinking fund is for the costs of future capital expenses.

From July 2009, each owners' corporation is required to have a ten-year sinking fund plan. Developing a ten-year sinking fund plan means that future repairs and maintenance are anticipated well in advance.

If the owners corporation has to pay a debt that was not budgeted for in either fund estimates, a special levy must be agreed at a general meeting and paid to the administrative fund in accordance with section 76 of the Strata Schemes Management Act 1996.

An unpaid levy incurs interest at the rate of 10% simple interest a year if not paid within one month after it is due.

==== Insurance ====
The owners corporation is responsible for making sure all necessary insurance policies are in place in accordance with section 83 of the Strata Schemes Management Act 1996. The building must be valued every five years in accordance with section 85 of the Strata Schemes Management Act 1996.

==== Record keeping ====
The owners corporation must keep certain records for at least 5 years including minutes of its meetings, correspondence, proxies and financial records.

==== Strata roll ====
The owners corporation must prepare and keep a strata roll in accordance with section 96 of the Strata Schemes Management Act 1996 including the name and addresses of all lot owners, tenants, mortgagees, the original owner and the managing agent, the units of entitlement, insurance details and the by-laws for the strata scheme.

==== Repairs and maintenance ====
The owners corporation must repair common property and lot owners must repair anything in their lot. However, this can be difficult as it is not always clear what is common property and what belongs to the lot owner.

Starting 30 November 2016, cosmetic changes to the lot will not require the owners' corporation's approval. Minor and major renovations, including changes to floorboards or changes to the structural and external appearance of the building will still require approval of 50% (general resolution) and 75% (special resolution) respectively.

==== By-laws ====
There is no mandatory set of by-laws. Some model by-laws are set out in legislation, others are set by the original owner. By-laws can be added, changed or repealed at a general meeting if the motion passes.

==== Strata managing agents ====
The owners corporation can engage a strata managing agent to work on behalf of all owners to help manage the strata scheme by entering into a managing agency agreement, which outlines their duties and responsibilities. The appointment of a managing agent can only be decided by a majority vote at a general meeting in accordance with section 27 as the Strata Schemes Management Act 1996. Agents carry out some or all of the functions or duties or powers of the owners corporation including administrative matters such as calling meetings and collecting levies.

==== Executive committee ====
The owners corporation must elect an executive committee which can make many of the day-to-day decisions about running the strata scheme on its behalf rather than deciding matters purely at general meetings however the owners corporation can overrule executive committee decisions or limit what they can make decisions about. The executive committee is elected at each annual general meeting. It can have between one and nine members. Once elected, the members decide who is to hold the office-bearers positions of chairperson, secretary and treasurer. Executive committee members can be elected if they are an owner, a company nominee or a person who is not an owner but who is nominated by an owner who is not standing for election.

==== Types of meetings ====
===== First annual general meeting =====
The first annual general meeting must be held within two months of the end of the initial period, which is once one third of the total units of entitlement have been sold and the lot owner information is recorded on the strata roll. The agenda includes deciding the insurance cover, accounting records, election of the executive committee, by-laws and the appointment of the strata managing agent and caretaker. Notice of the meeting must be given to each owner of a lot at least seven days before the meeting. If notices are being mailed, an additional four working days must be allowed for postage.

===== Annual general meetings =====
The annual general meeting agenda includes confirming previous minutes, a copy of the financial statements, information about insurance policies, appointing auditors and election of the executive committee. The notice period is the same as first annual general meetings.

===== Extraordinary general meetings =====
Any general meeting of the owners corporation that is not an annual general meeting is called an extraordinary general meeting. These meetings can be held when necessary. The notice period is the same as first general meetings.

==== Executive committee meetings ====
The executive committee agenda is held after the annual general meeting includes confirming previous minutes, appointing the office bearers and general day-to-day matters that arise. Notice of the meeting must be placed on the notice board 72 hours before the meeting. If the owners corporation does not have a notice board or the strata scheme is considered a large strata scheme, the meeting notice must be given to all lot owners. The notice can be given by email.

==== Resolving disputes ====
When disputes cannot be resolved informally, there is a more formal process of dispute resolution set out by the Strata Schemes Management Act 1996. Owners corporations, owners or residents can take action through mediation, adjudication and the NSW Civil and Administrative Tribunal.

== See also ==
- Commonhold
- Condominium (housing)
- Strata Title
- Homeowner association
