= Housing tenure =

Financial arrangements over the right to live in a home

Housing tenure is a financial arrangement and ownership structure under which someone has the right to live in a house or apartment. The most frequent forms are tenancy, in which rent is paid by the occupant to a landlord, and owner-occupancy, where the occupant owns their own home. Mixed forms of tenure are also possible.

The basic forms of tenure can be subdivided, for example an owner-occupier may own a house outright, or it may be mortgaged. In the case of tenancy, the landlord may be a private individual, a non-profit organization such as a housing association, or a government body, as in public housing.

Surveys used in social science research frequently include questions about housing tenure, because it is a useful proxy for income or wealth, and people are less reluctant to give information about it.

== Types ==
- Owner occupancy – The person or group that occupies a house owns the building (and usually the land on which it sits).
- Tenancy – A landlord who owns an apartment or building rents the right to occupy the unit to a tenant.
- Cooperative – Ownership of the entire building or complex is held in common by a homeowners' association. Individuals have the right to occupy a particular apartment by mutual agreement but do not hold exclusive ownership to it.
- Condominium (a.k.a. commonhold and strata title) – Ownership of an apartment or house is assigned to an individual, but common areas (e.g. hallways, heating system, elevators, exterior areas) are controlled by the homeowners' association. Fees are charged to the condo owners for maintenance of the common areas. These are referred to as "condo fees".
- Public housing – Government-owned housing, whether provided for free or leased at a subsidised rate.
- Squatting – Occupation by non-owner without permission by the owner, if any.
- Land trust – Often used as an alternative to ownership for privacy and legal reasons.

== Styles and variations ==
- Timeshare – A modified form of cooperative, condominium, or leased house or apartment, with short-term residency right agreements tailored for vacations.
- Cohousing – A variant of a condominium or cooperative with a high degree of interaction with neighbors in shared areas.

== England ==
The Department for Communities and Local Government is responsible for developing government housing policy in England. The English Housing Survey classifies all dwellings into one of four housing tenure classifications:

- Owner-occupied
- Private rented
- Rented from housing association (registered social landlords)
- Rented from local authorities

== See also ==
- Home
- Household
- List of house types
- Monotenure
- Real estate
