= 21st Century ROAD to Housing Act =

U.S. housing legislation

- Long title: An Act to increase the supply of housing in America, and for other purposes.
- Enacted by: the 119th United States Congress

Citations
- Public law: 119–101
- Statutes at Large: 140 Stat. 846

Legislative history
- Introduced in the House as H.R. 6644 by French Hill (R–AR) on December 11, 2025; Committee consideration by House Financial Services; Passed the House on February 9, 2026 (390–9); Passed the Senate on March 12, 2026 (89–10) with amendment; House agreed to Senate amendment on May 20, 2026 (396–13) with further amendment; Senate agreed to House amendment on June 22, 2026 (85–5); Left unsigned by President Donald Trump and became law on July 11, 2026

The 21st Century ROAD to Housing Act is a United States federal statute that expands housing. After being passed by large, bipartisan majorities in both chambers of Congress, it became law without President Trump's signature on July 11, 2026.

== Provisions ==
- Title 2 streamlines environmental reviews under the National Environmental Policy Act (NEPA); expands categorical exclusions for housing projects; creates competitive grants for zoning and planning updates; and authorizes the Department of Housing and Urban Development (HUD) to delegate reviews to states and localities, directly targeting regulatory delays that have historically inflated construction costs.
- Title 3 eliminates the permanent chassis requirement for manufactured housing; grants HUD primary authority over energy-efficiency standards; and directs studies on modular home production barriers.
- Title 9 raises community development bank public-welfare investment caps to 20% to boost local affordable-housing financing.
- Title 10 prohibits large institutional investors (defined as entities controlling at least 350 single-family homes) from purchasing new single-family homes, while carving out exceptions that include build-to-rent developments, renovate to rent programs, boost home ownership programs and senior living communities; establishes a HUD renter outreach resource to assist tenants in institutional investor-owned properties; and provides civil penalties for violations, sparking intense debate over corporate versus individual homeownership.

== Legislative history ==
In July 2025, the Senate Committee on Banking, Housing, and Urban Affairs began a markup on the ROAD to Housing Act. The act advanced through the committee in a 24–0 vote on July 29. South Carolina senator Tim Scott, the chairman of the Senate Committee on Banking, Housing, and Urban Affairs, introduced the bill as an amendment to the National Defense Authorization Act for Fiscal Year 2026. In September, nearly thirty housing organizations signed a letter to Senate Majority Leader John Thune and Senate Minority Leader Chuck Schumer urging them to bring the ROAD to Housing Act before a Senate vote. The Senate unanimously voted to pass the bill on October 9. The Trump administration encouraged Republicans to resolve housing affordability and supported an effort to include the ROAD to Housing Act in the National Defense Authorization Act for Fiscal Year 2026. As Republicans in the House of Representatives sought their own housing legislation, the act was excluded from the defense bill.

In December 2025, the House Committee on Financial Services and its Subcommittee on Housing and Insurance introduced the Housing for the 21st Century Act. According to Florida representative Mike Haridopolos, some House Republicans were concerned that the ROAD to Housing Act would lead to further spending and impose additional regulations. The committee voted to advance the Housing for the 21st Century Act on December 17. By February 2026, House leadership had considered expediting the bill by suspending the chamber's rules. The House of Representatives voted to approve the bill in a 390–9 vote on February 9, setting a dispute between the Senate's ROAD to Housing Act and the House's Housing for the 21st Century Act. According to The Wall Street Journal, the Trump administration sought to include language in either bill banning investors from owning single-family homes, a measure that lawmakers resisted. President Donald Trump called for barring large investors from operating single-family homes as rental properties, with an exception for build-to-rent communities; Senate Democrats countered with a proposal to end tax breaks on single-family rental homes for large investors.

In a procedural vote on March 2, 2026, the Senate advanced the 21st Century ROAD to Housing Act, a bill that combined the ROAD to Housing Act and the Housing for the 21st Century Act with the Trump administration's effort to limit large investors from purchasing single-family homes, in an 84–6 vote. The bill would additionally prevent the Federal Reserve from establishing a central bank digital currency for four years. The Senate voted to advance the bill in an 89–9–1 vote, the third procedural vote, on March 10. The following day, Speaker of the House Mike Johnson indicated that the bill had several problems at a House Republican retreat in Florida; Johnson noted that some House Republicans objected to its language prohibiting the establishment of a central bank digital currency and preventing large investors from purchasing single-family homes, believing that the Senate had tempered those provisions. On March 12, the Senate voted to pass the 21st Century ROAD to Housing Act in an 89–10 vote.

The 21st Century ROAD to Housing Act continued to experience challenges after its passage in the Senate with amendments. In May 2026, Politico reported that Trump had nearly published a social media post criticizing the bill over a provision requiring landlords to sell build-to-rent homes after seven years; the language had garnered criticism from some Republicans and Democrats in the House. Trump agreed not to intervene while his staff sought to negotiate with Republicans on the House Committee on Financial Services. Thune told Politico that the Trump administration would "have to really probably take some work to get the action in the House". The committee's chairman, Arkansas representative French Hill, and its ranking member, California representative Maxine Waters, had developed an amended housing bill by May. House Republicans considered presenting the bill to the chamber in an expedited suspension vote, and additionally examined adding certain provisions to the National Defense Authorization Act for Fiscal Year 2027. The draft text of amended bill from House Republicans would narrow the definition of a single-family home and would remove the build-to-rent provision.

Trump entered the dispute between the House and Senate's housing legislation in a post on Truth Social in May, stating that Congress should pass the Senate's 21st Century ROAD to Housing Act. Johnson and House Majority Leader Steve Scalise stated that they would continue attempting to amend the bill regardless. Seeking an affordability victory in the 2026 elections, the Trump administration directed prominent individuals in the MAGA movement to encourage the House to pass the Senate bill outright, including the political activist Jack Posobiec; Oren Cass, the chief economist of American Compass; and Bill Pulte, the director of the Federal Housing Finance Agency. The House released the final text of its bill on May 13. The bill would retain restrictions on large investors purchasing single-family homes, but would revise the meaning of a single-family home to exclude manufactured and renovated-for-sale homes. The Trump administration stated that the bill had "serious policy concerns or implementation challenges" and pressured House Republicans to support the Senate bill. According to Politico, Schumer was willing to support the House bill.

In another post on Truth Social in May, Trump urged Congress to link the SAVE America Act to the 21st Century ROAD to Housing Act and to a reauthorization bill for the Foreign Intelligence Surveillance Act. House Republicans did not add the SAVE America Act to the housing bill; one official told Politico that the House had already passed the SAVE America Act and that it was the Senate's responsibility to pass the bill separately. Johnson and Trump reached an agreement on the 21st Century ROAD to Housing Act on May 19. The House's changes led Trump to support the measure, according to The New York Times. The following day, the House of Representatives passed the 21st Century ROAD to Housing Act with amendments in a 396–13 vote, sending it back to the Senate. The Trump administration issued a statement saying that it supported the bill, asking the House and Senate to "resolve any remaining differences expeditiously".

On June 24, Trump abruptly announced he would refuse to sign the bill, arguing that passing the SAVE America Act is a "national emergency" and should take precedence. He shared that this bill was of "minor importance" amidst his goals. Speaker Johnson supported his refusal to sign the bill, while also saying that Trump would sign it within the 10 days before it automatically becomes law. Other Republican Congressmembers criticized Trump's decision.

On June 29, the bill was presented to President Trump for his signature. Under Article I, Section 7, Clause 2 of the U.S. Constitution, he had 10 days (excluding Sundays) to sign or veto the bill. The bill became law without President Trump's signature on July 11, 2026.

=== Final Senate vote ===
Vote to pass the 21st Century ROAD to Housing Act
July 11, 2026	Party			Total votes
July 11, 2026	Democratic	Republican	Independent	Total votes
Yea	41	42	2	85
Nay	0	5	0	5
Not voting	4	6	0	10
Result: Passed
Roll call vote on the passage: Senator / Party / State / Vote; Angela Alsobrooks / D / Maryland / Yea; Alan Armstrong / R / Oklahoma / Yea; Tammy Baldwin / D / Wisconsin / Yea; Jim Banks / R / Indiana / Yea; John Barrasso / R / Wyoming / Yea; Michael Bennet / D / Colorado; Marsha Blackburn / R / Tennessee / Yea; Richard Blumenthal / D / Connecticut / Yea; Lisa Blunt Rochester / D / Delaware / Yea; Cory Booker / D / New Jersey / Yea; John Boozman / R / Arkansas / Yea; Katie Britt / R / Alabama / Yea; Ted Budd / R / North Carolina / Yea; Maria Cantwell / D / Washington / Yea; Shelley Moore Capito / R / West Virginia / Yea; Bill Cassidy / R / Louisiana / Yea; Susan Collins / R / Maine / Yea; Chris Coons / D / Delaware / Yea; John Cornyn / R / Texas / Yea; Catherine Cortez-Masto / D / Nevada / Yea; Tom Cotton / R / Arkansas / Yea; Kevin Cramer / R / North Dakota / Yea; Mike Crapo / R / Idaho / Yea; Ted Cruz / R / Texas; John Curtis / R / Utah; Steve Daines / R / Montana / Yea; Tammy Duckworth / D / Illinois / Yea; Dick Durbin / D / Illinois / Yea; Joni Ernst / R / Iowa / Yea; John Fetterman / D / Pennsylvania / Yea; Deb Fischer / R / Nebraska / Yea; Ruben Gallego / D / Arizona / Yea; Kirsten Gillibrand / D / New York / Yea; Lindsey Graham / R / South Carolina; Chuck Grassley / R / Iowa / Yea; Bill Hagerty / R / Tennessee / Yea; Maggie Hassan / D / New Hampshire / Yea; Josh Hawley / R / Missouri / Yea; Martin Heinrich / D / New Mexico / Yea; John Hickenlooper / D / Colorado / Yea; Mazie Hirono / D / Hawaii / Yea; John Hoeven / R / North Dakota / Yea; Jon Husted / R / Ohio / Yea; Cindy Hyde-Smith / R / Mississippi / Yea; Ron Johnson / R / Wisconsin / Nay; Jim Justice / R / West Virginia; Tim Kaine / D / Virginia / Yea; Mark Kelly / D / Arizona / Yea; John Neely Kennedy / R / Louisiana / Yea; Andy Kim / D / New Jersey / Yea; Angus King / I / Maine / Yea; Amy Klobuchar / D / Minnesota / Yea; James Lankford / R / Oklahoma / Yea; Mike Lee / R / Utah / Nay; Ben Ray Luján / D / New Mexico / Yea; Cynthia Lummis / R / Wyoming / Yea; Ed Markey / D / Massachusetts / Yea; Mitch McConnell / R / Kentucky; Dave McCormick / R / Pennsylvania / Yea; Jeff Merkley / D / Oregon / Yea; Ashley Moody / R / Florida / Yea; Jerry Moran / R / Kansas / Yea; Bernie Moreno / R / Ohio / Yea; Lisa Murkowski / R / Alaska / Yea; Chris Murphy / D / Connecticut / Yea; Patty Murray / D / Washington; Jon Ossoff / D / Georgia / Yea; Alex Padilla / D / California / Yea; Rand Paul / R / Kentucky / Nay; Gary Peters / D / Michigan / Yea; Jack Reed / D / Rhode Island / Yea; Pete Ricketts / R / Nebraska / Yea; Jim Risch / R / Idaho / Yea; Jacky Rosen / D / Nevada / Yea; Mike Rounds / R / South Dakota / Yea; Bernie Sanders / I / Vermont / Yea; Brian Schatz / D / Hawaii / Yea; Adam Schiff / D / California / Yea; Eric Schmitt / R / Missouri / Yea; Chuck Schumer / D / New York / Yea; Rick Scott / R / Florida / Nay; Tim Scott / R / South Carolina / Yea; Jeanne Shaheen / D / New Hampshire / Yea; Tim Sheehy / R / Montana / Yea; Elissa Slotkin / D / Michigan; Tina Smith / D / Minnesota / Yea; Dan Sullivan / R / Alaska / Yea; John Thune / R / South Dakota / Yea; Thom Tillis / R / North Carolina / Yea; Tommy Tuberville / R / Alabama / Nay; Chris Van Hollen / D / Maryland / Yea; Mark Warner / D / Virginia / Yea; Raphael Warnock / D / Georgia / Yea; Elizabeth Warren / D / Massachusetts / Yea; Peter Welch / D / Vermont / Yea; Sheldon Whitehouse / D / Rhode Island; Roger Wicker / R / Mississippi / Yea; Ron Wyden / D / Oregon / Yea; Todd Young / R / Indiana

== Impact ==
According to The New York Times, the 21st Century ROAD to Housing Act is the most significant housing bill since the Cranston–Gonzalez National Affordable Housing Act in 1990. Prior to its passage, the 21st Century ROAD to Housing Act had significant implications for the build-to-rent industry. The developer TerraLane Communities paused construction on housing communities in Arizona and Texas in response to the bill. In May 2026, Bill Owens, the chairman of the National Association of Home Builders, stated that a revised bill would improve home builder sentiment.

== See also ==
- Containerized housing unit
