= Tehmtan Framroze =

British politician (1941–2017)

Tehmtan "Tehm" Framroze (1941–2017) was a British Labour politician, librarian, and public servant who served as the mayor of Brighton (1994–1995). He was notable for being Brighton's first mayor from an ethnic minority background.

== Early life ==
Born to a Parsi family in Zanzibar in 1941, Framroze immigrated to the United Kingdom in 1964. He was of Zoroastrian faith. The name "Tehmtan" is of Persian origin and means "clever" or "slanderer". The surname Framroze has its origins in the Persian language, where it is derived from the word "framarz" meaning "a flower" or "blossom."

== Career ==
After arriving in Britain, Framroze began working at the University of Sussex library, where he met his future wife, Marian, who was also a librarian. He served as a Labour councillor for 21 years across various local government bodies:

- Brighton Borough Council
- East Sussex County Council
- Brighton and Hove City Council

During his tenure, he represented the Coldean ward and held several significant positions:

- Chairman of the Housing Committee
- Mayor of Brighton (1994–1995)
- Member of the Film Viewing Working Party

== Public service and activism ==
Framroze was instrumental in establishing the Black & Minority Ethnic Community Partnership (BMECP) in Brighton. His commitment to public service was driven by his cultural heritage and desire to challenge anti-immigrant sentiment in Britain. He notably remarked that "good thoughts, good words and good deeds" were the driving forces behind his entry into public service.

In 2007, he was made an alderman of Brighton and Hove "in grateful recognition of his exceptional contribution to Hollingbury and Stanmer Ward (and) the city and in gratitude for eminent and distinguished service as a member of the council."

== Political legacy ==
Framroze was particularly proud of being elected in a constituency that was 95% white, demonstrating that his appeal transcended ethnic boundaries. He chose local government over national politics, stating: "I decided local government because you were in power. You were the administration. You could do things. In opposition you could protest only."

His tenure as Housing Committee chairman was marked by particular concern for standards in the private rented sector. He was also known for his work on the Film Viewing Working Party, which gained national attention when it banned the film 9½ Weeks from public cinemas in Brighton.

== Personal life ==
Framroze was married to Marian whom he met while both worked as librarians at the University of Sussex. In his later years, he resided at Maycroft Manor care home in Brighton, where he remained engaged in discussions about housing and social issues despite his physical frailty. He died on January 5, 2017, at the age of 75.

== Legacy ==
Framroze was remembered by colleagues for his booming voice, commitment to socialism, and his frequently repeated phrase: "Comrades, we are on the threshold of socialism." Warren Morgan, the council leader at the time of his death, noted that "the city owes him a great debt of thanks for his contribution to public life." He was particularly praised for maintaining his good humor and dignity during his final illness, with former colleague Jean Calder noting his "rare and wonderful capacity to rise above suffering."
