= Davis–Stirling Common Interest Development Act =

Regarding California HOAs

The Davis–Stirling Common Interest Development Act is the popular name of the portion of the California Civil Code beginning with section 4000, which governs condominium, cooperative, and planned unit development communities in California. Contrary to what the title of the Act suggests, the bill was authored/drafted by University of San Diego School of Law Professor Katharine N. Rosenberry while she served as a Senior Consultant to the California Assembly Select Committee on Common Interest Developments. Assemblymen Lawrence W. "Larry" Stirling and Gray Davis added their names as authors prior to the bill being passed/enacted by the California State Legislature in September 1985. The Act was comprehensively reorganized and recodified by Assembly Bill 805 as of 2014.

== Homeowner association ==
Under Davis–Stirling, a developer of a common interest development is able to create a homeowner association (HOA) to govern the development. As part of creating the HOA, the developer records a document known as the Declaration of Covenants, Conditions, and Restrictions (CC&Rs) against the units or parcels within the HOA with the county recorder.

Even though it is not a governmental entity, the HOA operates like one in some respects. As recognized by the Supreme Court of California, the Declaration of CC&Rs is the constitution of the HOA and is legally binding upon residents to the extent that it does not conflict with state or federal law. CC&Rs, once properly recorded, are presumed valid until proven otherwise. The California Courts of Appeal have explained the quasi-governmental nature of the HOA:

Indeed, the homeowners associations function almost 'as a second municipal government, regulating many aspects of [the homeowners'] daily lives.' [Citation.] " ' "[U]pon analysis of the association's functions, one clearly sees the association as a quasi-government entity paralleling in almost every case the powers, duties, and responsibilities of a municipal government. As a 'mini-government,' the association provides to its members, in almost every case, utility services, road maintenance, street and common area lighting, and refuse removal. In many cases, it also provides security services and various forms of communication within the community. There is, moreover, a clear analogy to the municipal police and public safety functions...." ' [Citation.]" [Citation.] In short, homeowners associations, via their enforcement of the CC&R's, provide many beneficial and desirable services that permit a common interest development to flourish.

The HOA's board may enact rules which are legally binding upon residents as long as they do not conflict with the CC&Rs or state or federal law. Board meetings, like the boards of government agencies, are generally open to HOA members, with some exceptions. As with government agencies, courts generally defer to the broad discretion HOAs enjoy in discharging their duties.

The HOA is also allowed to charge regular fees to homeowners within the development (comparable to taxes). These are used for functions like paying for security guards (including, for gated communities, the operation of a gatehouse) and maintaining common areas like corridors, walkways, parking, landscaping, swimming pools, fitness centers, tennis courts, and so on. The HOA can levy fines or sue homeowners for damages and/or injunctive relief to enforce the HOA's rules and CC&Rs.

== Background ==
There were two major historical trends during the 1970s that led to the enactment of Davis–Stirling. First, there was a transition away from the single-family detached home, which had been the dominant residential development paradigm for much of the state's history. California developers traditionally focused solely on building and selling single-family detached homes as fast as possible to make a quick buck. They did not concern themselves with building public amenities like parks. They assumed that city governments would tax new residents to build such things. By the 1970s, developers had mostly run out of good land for such low-density developments and began to focus on building higher-density developments, often on marginal land that had been previously overlooked because it had been considered to be too rugged or too distant from urban downtowns. To make these developments profitable while complying with local density restrictions (which usually measured density in terms of average numbers across an entire development), they would often build high-density structures on one parcel, such as a condo complex, a cluster of townhouses, or a line of patio homes (all of which required less sprawling infrastructure than the equivalent number of single-family detached homes it would take to house the same number of people). They would simultaneously set aside an adjacent parcel to be either left undeveloped as open space or to be developed into a recreational area like a park to benefit and serve the residents of the development. Therefore, developers needed to find a way to ensure that the inhabited parcels benefiting from the adjacent recreational areas would take care of them.

Second, the enactment of Proposition 13 by California voters in 1978 severely limited the ability of local governments to raise property taxes. This made local governments increasingly reluctant to approve new residential developments, since they were now uncertain about their ability to provide adequate public services to new residents based on current and future projected revenues. Before approving new developments, local governments began to force developers to privatize all kinds of services which had been traditionally regarded as public goods: street maintenance, street landscaping, sewer service, lighting, security, fire protection, recreational centers, parks, and the like. Developers were compelled to create homeowners' associations which would extract fees and assessments from homeowners to pay for such services. (Local governments also began to impose user fees and special assessments on real property for services and public improvements in lieu of higher taxes, which was then curtailed by the 1996 enactment of Proposition 218, the "Right to Vote on Taxes Act".)

During the early 1980s, the resulting HOA boom revealed the severe limitations of the California laws then applicable to common interest developments. Many HOAs ran into difficulties because they were poorly planned and were only weakly regulated (if at all) by the Condominium Act of 1963. In the fall of 1984, the California State Assembly convened a Select Assembly Committee to address the crisis. This committee had four broad objectives in drafting the bill that became the Davis–Stirling Act: (1) consolidate existing statutory provisions; (2) standardize the laws governing common interest developments across the board and make exceptions only as needed for specific types of developments; (3) validate existing practices; and (4) resolve various problems with HOA operations.

== Structural summary ==
- General Provisions (§4000-§4190)
- Application of Act(§4200-§4202)
- Governing Documents(§4205-§4370)
- Ownership and Transfer of Interests(§4500-§4650)
- Property Use and Maintenance(§4700-§4790)
- Association Governance(§4800-§5405)
- Finances(§5500-§5580)
- Assessments and Assessment Collection (§5600-§5740)
- Insurance and Liability(§5800-§5810)
- Dispute Resolution and Enforcement(§5850-§5985)
- Construction Defect Litigation (§6000-§6150)

== Revisions ==
As of January 1, 2014, Title 6 (commencing with Section 1350) of Part 4 of Division 2 of the Civil Code was repealed and was effectively replaced by newly added Part 5 (commencing with Section 4000) of Division 4 of the Civil Code. The Davis–Stirling Act was completely renumbered and reorganized within the California Civil Code. The reorganization was intended to make the law easier to understand by implementing standardized language, more logical grouping of subjects, and shorter Civil Code sections. However, the content of the original law remained mostly the same.

=== Most notable areas of change ===
- Standardized rules of notice and delivery
- Annual reports and disclosures
- Conflicts of interest
- Exclusive use common areas
- Non-compliance
- Liens
- Reimbursement assessments
- Temporary relocation
