= Condominium legislation =

Condominium legislation is the body of laws governing the ownership, use, management and transfer of units in a building or complex where individual components are privately owned and common areas are collectively owned or controlled. The term condominium is used for both this type of property ownership and, depending on the jurisdiction, for the legal framework under which it is governed.

The legal status of individual units (apartments, offices, etc.) and their distinction from common elements, which may include structural components, roofs, foundations, stairways, elevators, corridors, recreational facilities, and land associated with the development, are usually defined by condominium laws. Typically the owner of a unit will own a share in the common elements, but the legal framework will vary from jurisdiction to jurisdiction.

== See also ==
- Condominium
- Real estate
- Homeowners' association
