= Subdivision (land) =

Divided piece of land

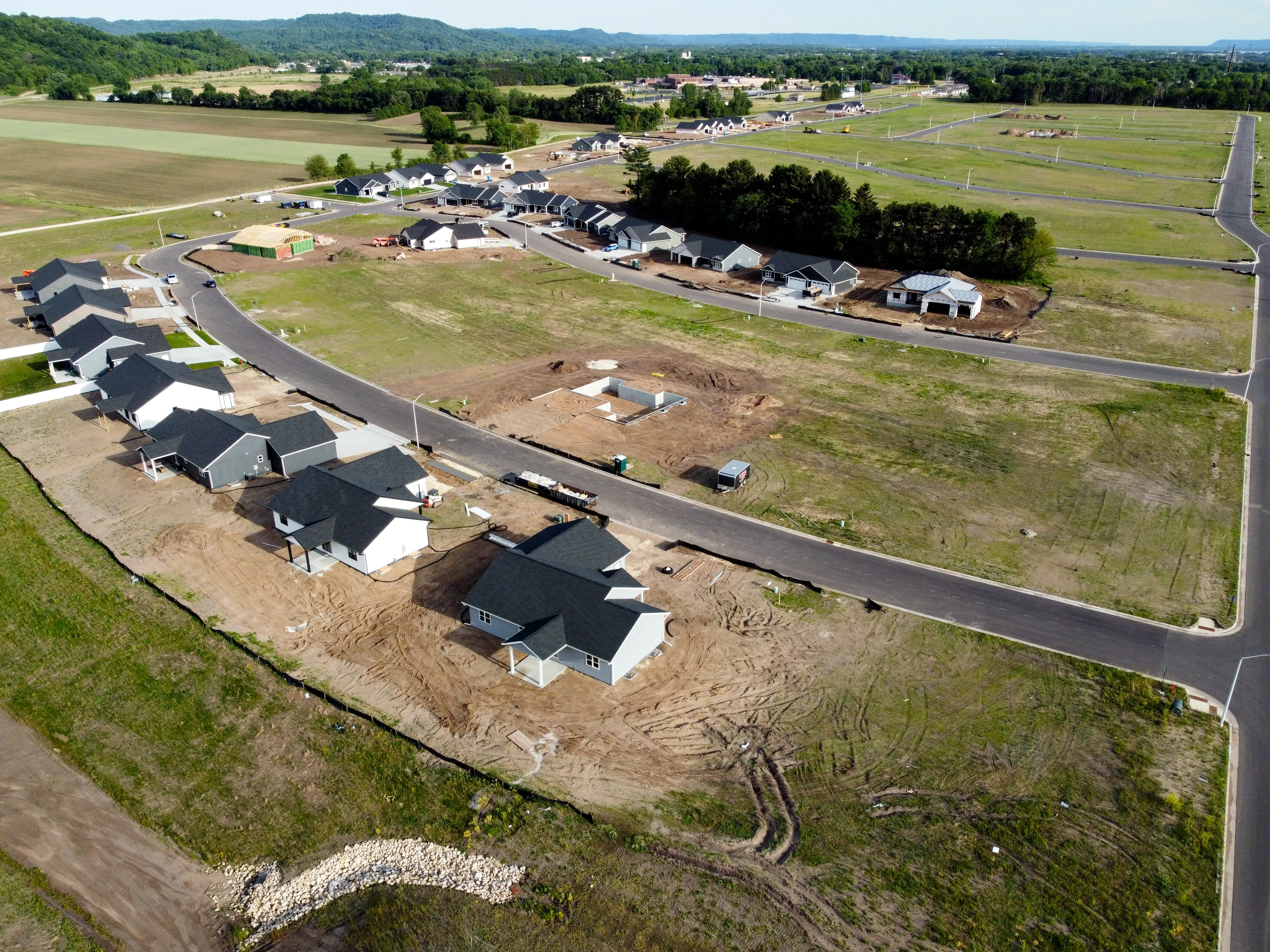
Subdivision land development

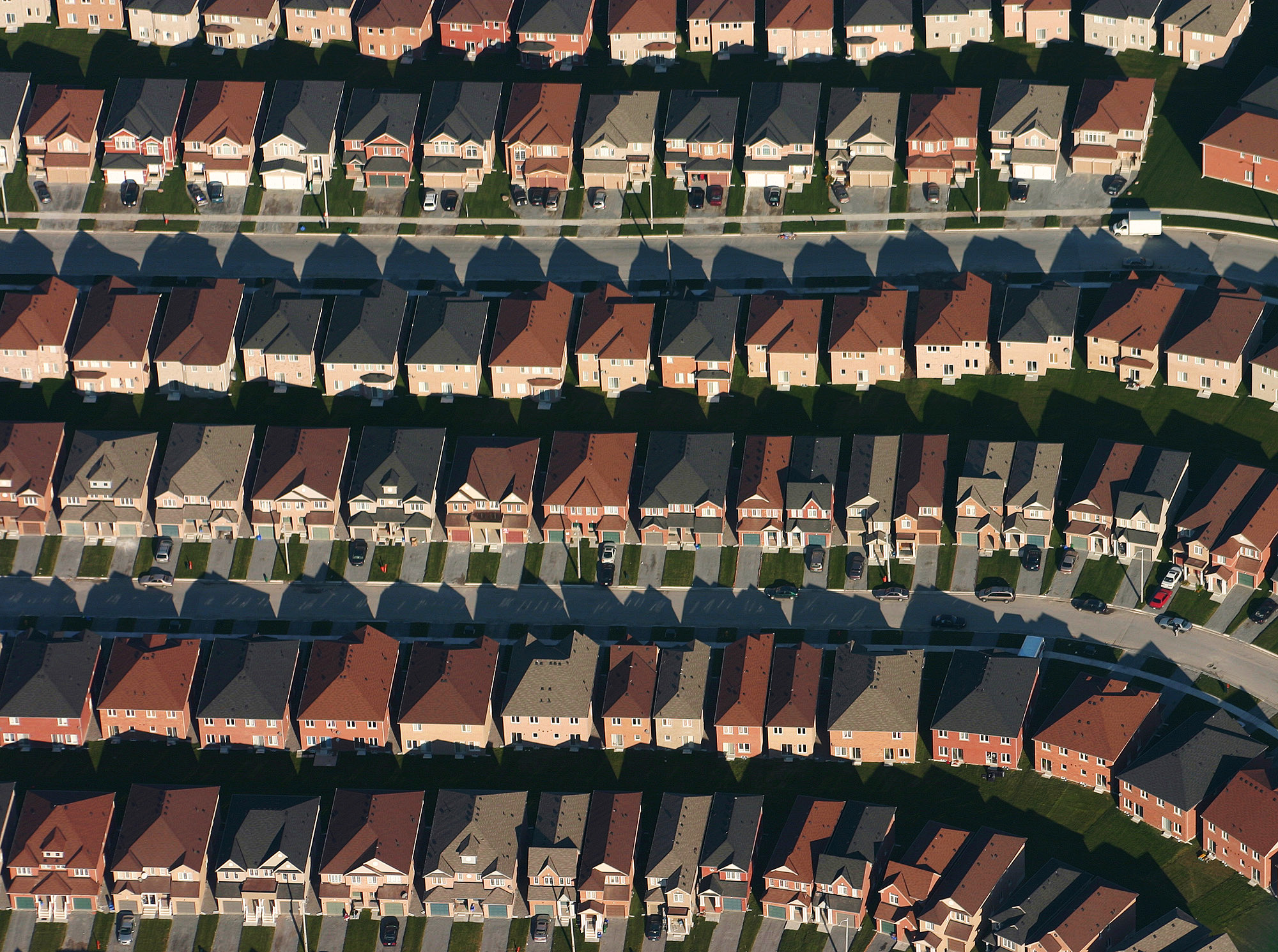
A subdivision in Markham, Ontario

Subdivisions are land that is divided into pieces that are easier to sell or otherwise develop, usually via a plat. The former single piece as a whole is then known as a subdivision. Subdivisions may be simple, involving only a single seller and buyer, or complex, involving large tracts of land divided into many smaller parcels. If it is used for housing it is typically known as a housing subdivision or housing development, although some developers tend to call these areas communities.

Subdivisions may also be for the purpose of commercial or industrial development, and the results vary from retail shopping malls with independently owned out parcels to industrial parks.

== United States ==
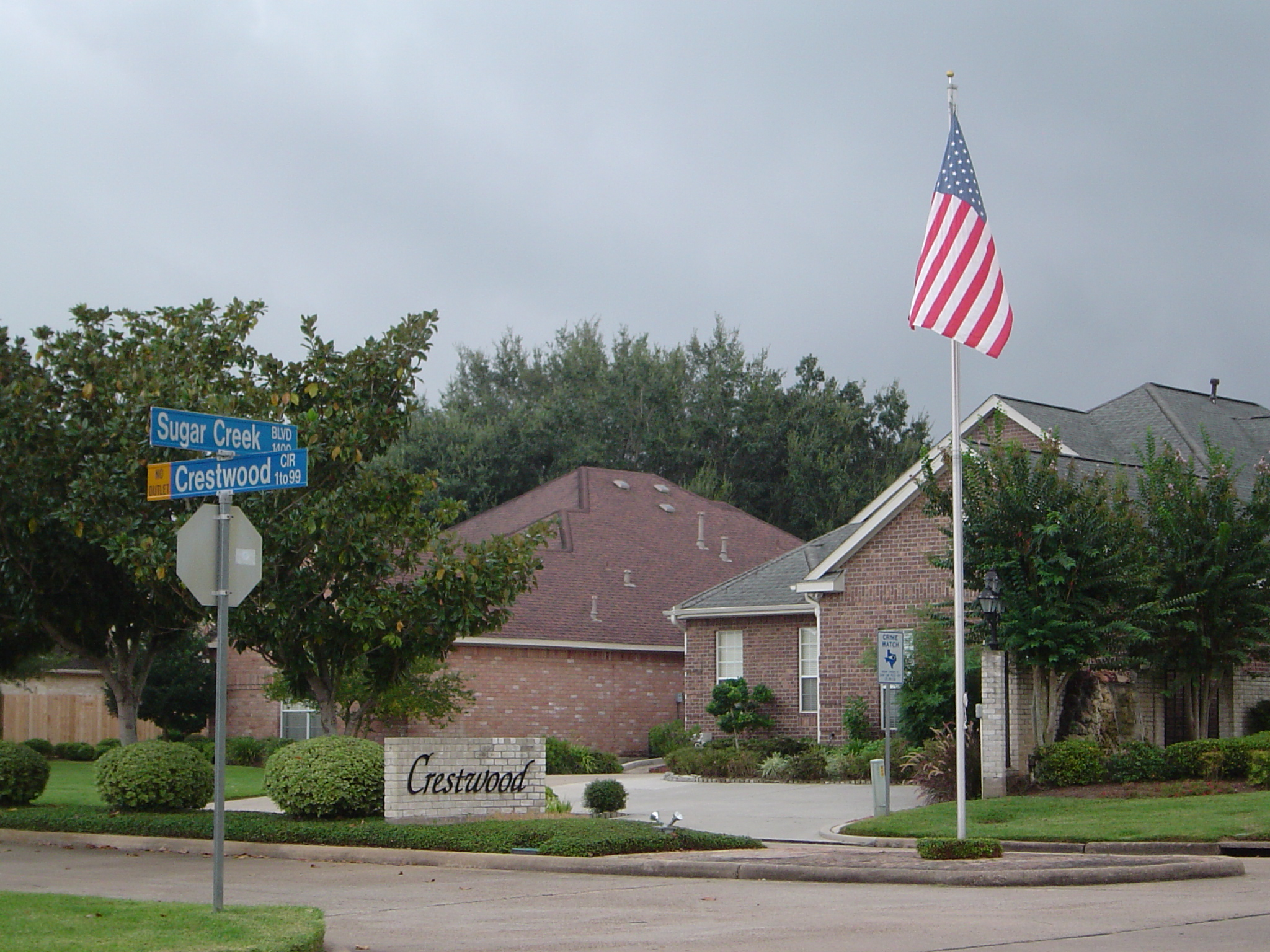
The entrance to a subdivision in Sugar Land, Texas

=== History ===
In the United States, the creation of a subdivision was often the first step toward the creation of a new incorporated township or city, or a community expanding beyond its original platted land. Contemporary notions of subdivisions rely on the Lot and Block survey system, which became widely used in the 19th century as a means of addressing the expansion of cities into surrounding farmland. While this method of property identification was useful for purposes of conveyancing, it did not address the overall impacts of expansion and the need for a comprehensive approach to planning communities.

In the 1920s, the Coolidge administration formed the Advisory Committee on City Planning and Zoning, which undertook as its first task the publication of The Standard State Zoning Enabling Act in 1926, model enabling legislation for use by state legislatures. This was followed by publication of the Standard City Planning Enabling Act (SCPEA) in 1928. The SCPEA covered six subjects: (1) the organization and power of planning commissions, which was directed to prepare and adopt a master plan; (2) the content of the master plan; (3) provisions for a master street plan; (4) provisions for approval of all public improvements by the planning commission; (5) control of private subdivision of land; and (6) provisions for the creation of regional planning commissions.

=== Definition ===
The SCPEA included the following definition:

"Subdivision" means the division of a lot, tract, or parcel of land into two or more lots, plats, sites, or other divisions of land for the purpose, whether immediate or future, of sale or of building development. It includes resubdivision and, when appropriate to the context, relates to the process of subdividing or to the land or territory subdivided.

Attached to this definition was the following footnote:

for the purpose of sale or of building development: Every division of a piece of land into two or more lots, parcels or parts is, of course, a subdivision. The intention is to cover all subdivision of land where the immediate or ultimate purpose is that of selling the lots or building on them. The object of inserting a definition in the text of the act is to avoid the inclusion, within the planning commission's control, of such cases as a testator's dividing his property amongst his children, partners' dividing firm property amongst themselves on dissolution, or cases of that nature.

A subdivision does not need to be sold, in whole or in part, for its resulting pieces to be considered separate parcels of land. A subdivision plat approved by a local planning commission, once recorded in a registry of deeds, is generally deemed to have created the parcels of land identified on the plat itself.

The problem of testamentary division of property was identified by the SCPEA in the footnote to the definition of subdivision, but not fully clarified by it. In some jurisdictions, a testamentary division of property does not constitute a legal subdivision for purposes of separate conveyancing of the "subdivided" parcels.

Furthermore, the SCPEA's definition leaves ambiguous the notion of 'building development' and whether the identification of multiple construction sites on a single parcel of land constitutes a subdivision subject to the review and approval authority of the planning commission. Interpretations of this vary among American jurisdictions. Subdivision developers may use an architect's services only once, with the rest of the tract houses using the same master template: the resulting houses all look similar as in the above photograph of Markham, Ontario.

The overall purpose of a subdivision is to create an environment conducive to overall development and sustained growth, with development defined as:

… the design work of lot layout, the construction of drainage structures, the construction of buildings or public use areas, the planning and construction of public streets and public roads, and the placement of public utilities.

== United Kingdom and Ireland ==
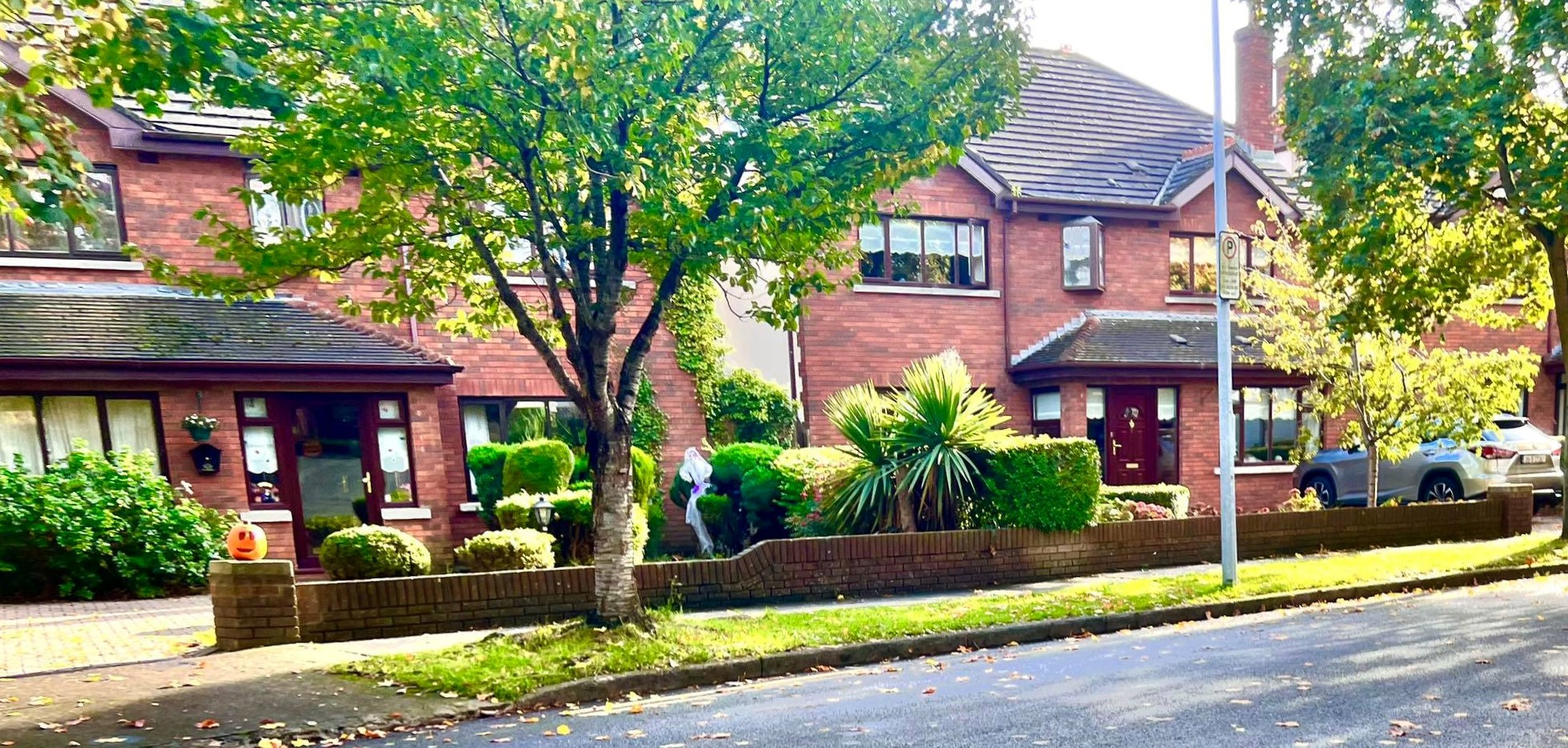
An upper middle class housing estate on the southern side of Swords, Dublin, Ireland. High-end tract developments tend to be smaller in size and more varied in typology.

In the United Kingdom and Ireland, subdivisions are usually areas of land that have been zoned for a particular type of residential development, often called a housing estate. They can vary enormously in character, density, and socioeconomic value. They have existed for well over a century, but became prevalent after World War II, as a more affluent population demanded larger and more widely spaced houses coupled with the increase of car usage for which terraced streets were unsuitable.

Subdivisions were often produced by either local authorities (more recently, housing associations) or by private developers. The former tended to be a means of producing public housing leading to monotenure estates full of council houses often known as "council estates". The latter can refer to higher end tract housing for the middle class and even upper middle class.

== Philippines ==
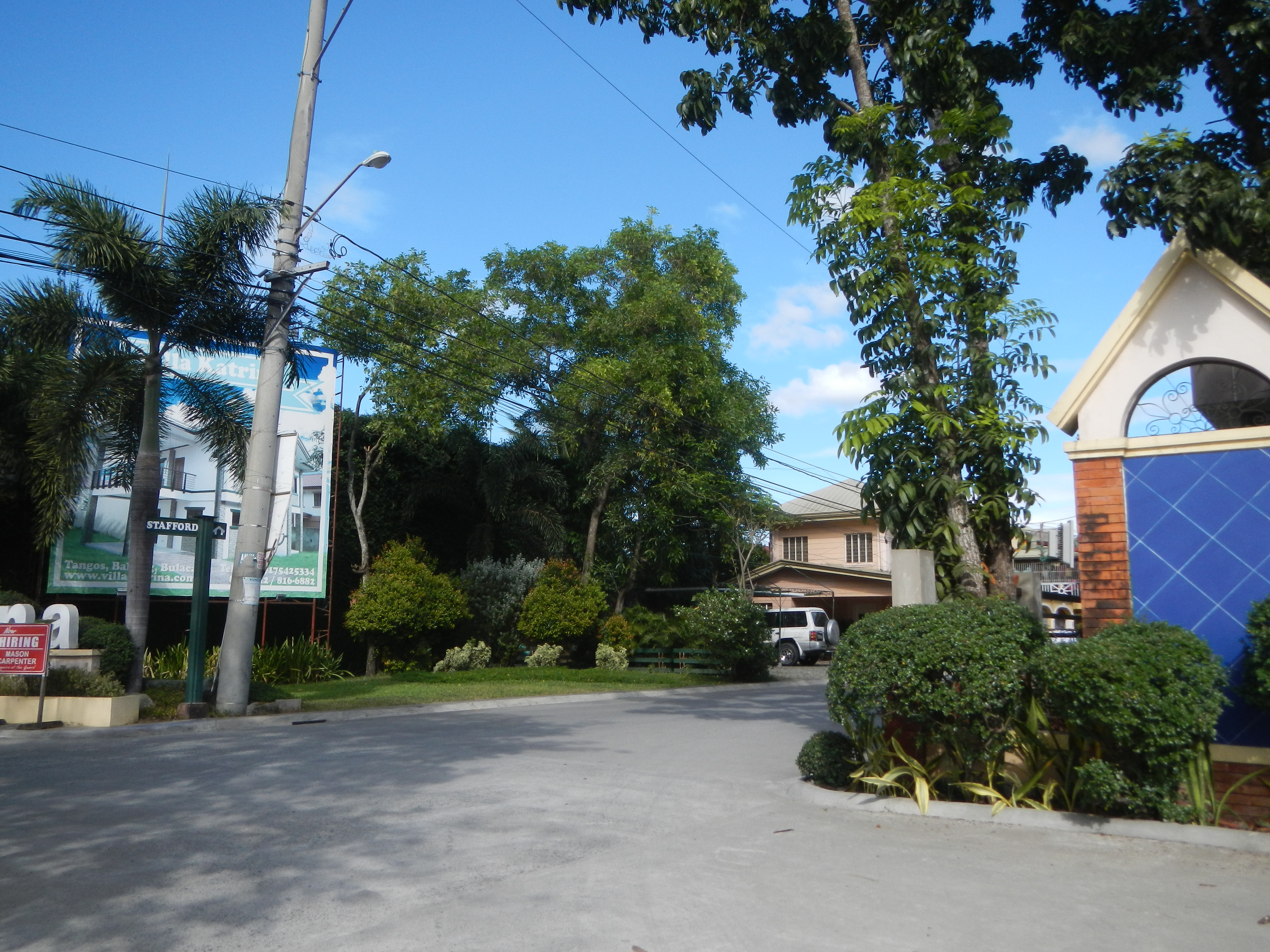
Entrance to a subdivision in Baliwag, Bulacan, Philippines

In the Philippines, subdivisions are areas of land that have been subdivided into individual residential plots. Whereas some subdivisions comprise exclusive gated communities, others are merely demarcations denoting a specific neighborhood. Some subdivisions may conduct autonomous security, or provide basic services such as water and refuse management. Most subdivisions are governed by associations made up of members who are residents of the subdivision.

In the Philippines, gated subdivisions for upper class homeowners are typically branded as villages. Depending on each local government's organization, subdivisions such as Forbes Park and Ayala Alabang are governed by barangays whose jurisdictions match subdivision borders.

== Canada ==
In Alberta, subdivision is the dividing of a single parcel of land into two or more parcels, each to be given a separate title. Subdivision is also used for existing lot line adjustments. Notwithstanding a few exceptional circumstances, subdivision approval and endorsement by the local municipality must always be received before the subdivision can be registered at the Land Titles Office and titles issued (including bare land condominiums). Exceptions may occur with parcels of land that contain more than one quarter section, a river lot, a lake lot, or some settlement lots created prior to July 1, 1950.

== See also ==
- Condominium conversion
- Gated community
- Levittown, New York (US archetype of a planned community)
- Homeowners' association
- Housing estate
- Severance (land)
- Terraced house
- Tract housing
- Urban planning
- Urban sprawl
- Urbanization
- Zoning
