= Monotenure =

Monotenure is a planning term relating to the land tenure of a development or neighbourhood.

== Definition ==
There are generally three types of residential land tenure within the built environment: private sector housing (also known as market housing), social housing, and intermediate (or shared ownership) housing. The term monotenure can be applied to an area where any of these three types of tenures are prevalent; however, the term is generally used to apply to areas where social housing is the primary tenure.

'Monotenure' areas generally relate to the most poverty stricken areas within an urban area, suffering from higher levels of crime, fear of crime, economic deprivation, and social exclusion.

== History ==
In recent years, governments in the United States and United Kingdom have targeted social tenure neighbourhoods for 'regeneration', with a primary aim of converting some or all of the social housing into private sector housing.

In the UK, the majority of monotenure neighbourhoods were formed post World War II, when the Government undertook a programme of slum clearance. Since the 1970s, the UK government has restricted funding for social housing projects. This has also impacted upon the existing housing stock, which has often fallen into disrepair. Many Councils are now seeking to address the problems of monotenure neighbourhoods through estate renewal. Private sector housing is used to not only fund the development but also to address the monotenure nature of the neighbourhood and create a more 'mixed' community. This dilution of public sector housing is considered to lead to more sustainable and successful communities. In addition, the provision and sale of private sector housing can be used to fund improvements to the existing public sector housing. Monies for the improvement of social housing have dried up in recent years and it is anticipated that future improvements to social housing will only be achieved through the provision of private sector housing.

== See also ==
- Housing tenure
