= Strata title =

Form of legal ownership for apartments

Strata title is a form of ownership and housing tenure devised for multi-level apartment blocks and horizontal subdivisions with shared areas. The word "strata" refers to apartments on different levels.

Strata title was first introduced in 1961 in the state of New South Wales, Australia, to better cope with the legal ownership of apartment blocks. Previously, the only adequate method of dividing ownership was company title, which had a number of defects, such as the difficulty of instituting mortgages. This term also applies to house-type strata title units in Australia.

Other countries that have adopted the Australian system (or a similar variant) of apartment ownership include: Canada (Alberta, British Columbia), Fiji, India, Indonesia, Malaysia, New Zealand, the Philippines, Singapore, South Africa and the United Arab Emirates. Other countries have legislation based on similar principles but with different definitions and using different mechanisms in their administration.

Strata title schemes are composed of individual lots and common property. Lots are either apartments, garages or storerooms and each is shown on the title as owned by a lot owner. Common property is defined as everything else on the parcel of land that is not comprised in a lot, such as common stairwells, driveways, roofs, gardens and so on.

== In New Zealand ==
In New Zealand, strata title, commonly called a unit title, is created by the Unit Titles Act 2010. There are 145,000 unit title dwellings in New Zealand.

A unit title can be either a stratum in freehold, where the owners own the underlying land, or stratum in leasehold, where another person owns the land and the body corporate pays rent to that person. As New Zealand uses the Torrens System of indefeasible titles, the title for a unit title has a title for the principal unit, showing the legal description of the principal unit and any accessory units and any legal document registered against those units (called an interest); a Supplementary Record Sheet, showing the rules of the body corporate, its registered address and any interests registered against the underlying land; and the survey plan, which shows the boundaries of the units and the common property.

A person purchasing a unit title purchases a principal unit, which is designed as a place of business or residence; any accessory units included in the title for the principal unit, such as car parks and storage lockers; and a beneficial interest in the common property, such as corridors, air ducts, building structure and entry ways; and membership in the body corporate, which is composed of all unit owners and which legally owns the common property.

Creation of a unit title is a type of subdivision and so requires the approval of the relevant territorial authority under the Resource Management Act 1991, as well as under the Unit Titles Act 2010. A unit plan must be deposited with Land Information New Zealand and new titles issued in respect of each principal unit.

The body corporate is responsible for maintaining the common property and the structure of the building (if this duty is delegated by the owners), and for insuring the common property and the building structure. The body corporate can set rules governing the use of the common property (for example, an owner who causes damage must repair it) and the units (for example, limiting pets, or noise levels depending on the time of day), and for the regulation of the body corporate. These rules must be registered and non-registered rules do not have legal effect. The operations of the body corporate are paid for by levies on all owners. Levies are assigned based on the ownership interest or utility interest of the particular unit. An ownership interest is based on the value of the unit, while a utility interest is either the ownership interest or a proportion that is fair and equitable having regard to the costs and benefits of the unit.

The owners in the unit title development must meet yearly to approve the levies, the financial statements, long term maintenance plan and fund (if any), approve changes to the body corporate rules (if any), and the appointment of the body corporate chairman and committee (if any). The body corporate can delegate most of their duties to the committee of the owners. The body corporate can also enter into service agreements in respect of the administration of the body corporate, usually to a specialist body corporate management firm, and building maintenance, including appointing a building manager. These service agreements must be permitted under the body corporate rules.

A body corporate must have a long term maintenance plan, which provides for maintenance of the common property for at least ten years and an estimate of the costs. The long term maintenance plan is then paid for by the long term maintenance fund, which must be separate from the body corporate general operating fund. However, a body corporate can elect not to have a Long Term Maintenance Fund.

Disputes under the Unit Titles Act are heard in the Tenancy Tribunal.

== See also ==
- Commonhold
- Condominium
- Homeowner association
- Strata management
- Tenancy-in-common
