= North Carolina Planned Community Act =

The North Carolina Planned Community Act, Chapter 47F of the North Carolina General Statutes, is a statute that governs the creation, operation, and destruction of a planned community in the state of North Carolina. According to the Homeowners Association of North Carolina, presently in the state there are over 18,000 homeowner associations accounting for roughly 53% of households.

The statute consists of three articles, which respectively cover general provisions, development, and management of planned communities.

== Article 1: General Provisions ==
Article I states that the North Carolina Planned Community Act is applicable only to a planned community created on or after January 1, 1999. Planned communities created before January 1, 1999, can operate under the statute if they express it in their community declaration. The law does not apply to communities that contain less than 20 lots or are not for residential use, unless agreed to in the community declaration. The statute cannot be changed by agreement or exploited by its limitations. Article I also protects planned communities against zoning discrimination. It is illegal to impose any zoning, building, or real estate codes that have not been imposed on other non-planned residential communities. Eminent domain is a hot button issue that has affected the relationship between the government and its citizens. The North Carolina Planned Community Act provides a payment allocation plan for lots taken by eminent domain. If a portion of the lot was taken, the lot owner is to be compensated for the loss the property value.

== Article 2: Development ==
Article II of the North Carolina Planned Community Act contains provisions for establishing, changing, and terminating a planned residential neighborhood. All records pertaining to a planned residential community must be registered in the county or counties in which they reside. In order to establish a planned community, the community declaration needs to be registered, similar to a deed, with the county. All declarations and bylaws set forth by the community are absolute, except in situations in which it goes against the North Carolina Planned Community Act. Article II also sets 67% as the minimum number of affirmation votes needed to amend the community declaration. The law also protects a homeowner association against lawsuits regarding amendments after one year has passed. In order to terminate a planned residential community, the declaration must require at least 80% of votes. Also, if the neighborhood association is terminated, the common elements can be sold but the homes do not, unless otherwise agreed to in the community declaration. A home foreclosure within the planned community does not remove the home from the homeowner association. However, the new owner can require the association to remove the residence from the homeowner association.

== Article 3: Management ==
Article III describes the organization, powers, and the duties included within the management of a planned residential community. Arguably, the most significant part of Article III is that planned communities are created as a non-profit corporation. Homeowner associations have the same rights and powers as corporations. Like a corporation, under the North Carolina Planned Community Act, the homeowner association must elect an executive board. Under the bylaws the community members are required to set the number of board members, qualifications, and process by which to amend bylaws among many others. The executive board serves as the voice for the community in matters such as transactions pertaining to the common areas, enforcement of rules, and collection of assessments. Overall, Article III, and similar segments of laws from other states, has served as one of the many mechanisms in which homeowner associations have usurped local municipal governments as the preferred government of middle class residents.

== Assessment ==
The passage of the North Carolina Planned Community Act illustrates the growing power homeowner associations have gained throughout the year. The state law expresses the state's power over the homeowner association. It even describes certain practices in which it must submit to the authority of the county. Nowhere in the statute, does it mention the homeowner association's obligation to the municipality, essentially meaning that the state is allowing the corporation to operate as its own municipality.
