= Build to rent =

Housing term

Build to rent is a term for purpose built, institutionally owned and professionally managed residential property that is put for rent on the open market rather than sold.

== Growth in the UK market ==
In October 2016, it was estimated that only some 8,000 units had been built with a further 15,000 units under construction. To date, the majority of completed projects have come forward in London and the major provincial cities such as Manchester, Liverpool and Sheffield. Construction is now underway in Birmingham and Leeds. The UK Government is reportedly encouraging the sector's growth.

By September 2019 the number of units either built or in construction was reported to have increased to 35,000 following large developments by a number of firms report in the media.

Build-to-rent is the most contemporary development in the private rented sector (PRS) and offers housing across the full spectrum of privately rented accommodation in terms of scale and service offering, often with affordable housing being integrated through discounted market rental homes.

=== Criticism ===
Tenants in BTR properties typically pay an 11% premium over other properties in similar locations, according to one study.

== Innovation ==
Build-to-rent developments are incorporating modern technologies and sustainable practices, such as energy-efficient systems and water conservation. One such example includes the integration of Tesla electric vehicles in some projects, like those by PropiCloud, which represent an innovative approach to enhancing urban living sustainably.

== Growth in the US ==
In the United States, build-to-rent (BTR) housing has emerged as a growing segment of the residential market, particularly in response to declining housing affordability and elevated mortgage rates. BTR communities typically consist of newly constructed single-family homes or townhouses intended exclusively for rental occupancy. Data derived from the U.S. Census Bureau indicate that construction of single-family homes built specifically for rent has increased significantly in recent years, with tens of thousands of such units started annually and the segment accounting for a rising share of all single-family housing construction. Reporting by NPR has noted that the development of rental-oriented single-family housing has grown as part of a broader response to the U.S. housing shortage, providing additional supply for households priced out of homeownership. Industry organizations further report that BTR development has expanded across multiple regions, particularly in high-growth markets, as developers respond to sustained demand for lower-density rental options. The sector is often characterized as a hybrid housing model, combining features of traditional apartment rentals with the space and amenities associated with owner-occupied single-family homes.

=== Criticism ===
Some critics argue that the expansion of build-to-rent housing may contribute to reduced homeownership opportunities and upward pressure on housing prices, particularly as institutional investors acquire and develop single-family properties at scale.

== See also ==
- Buy to let
