= Common-interest development =

Form of housing from the US

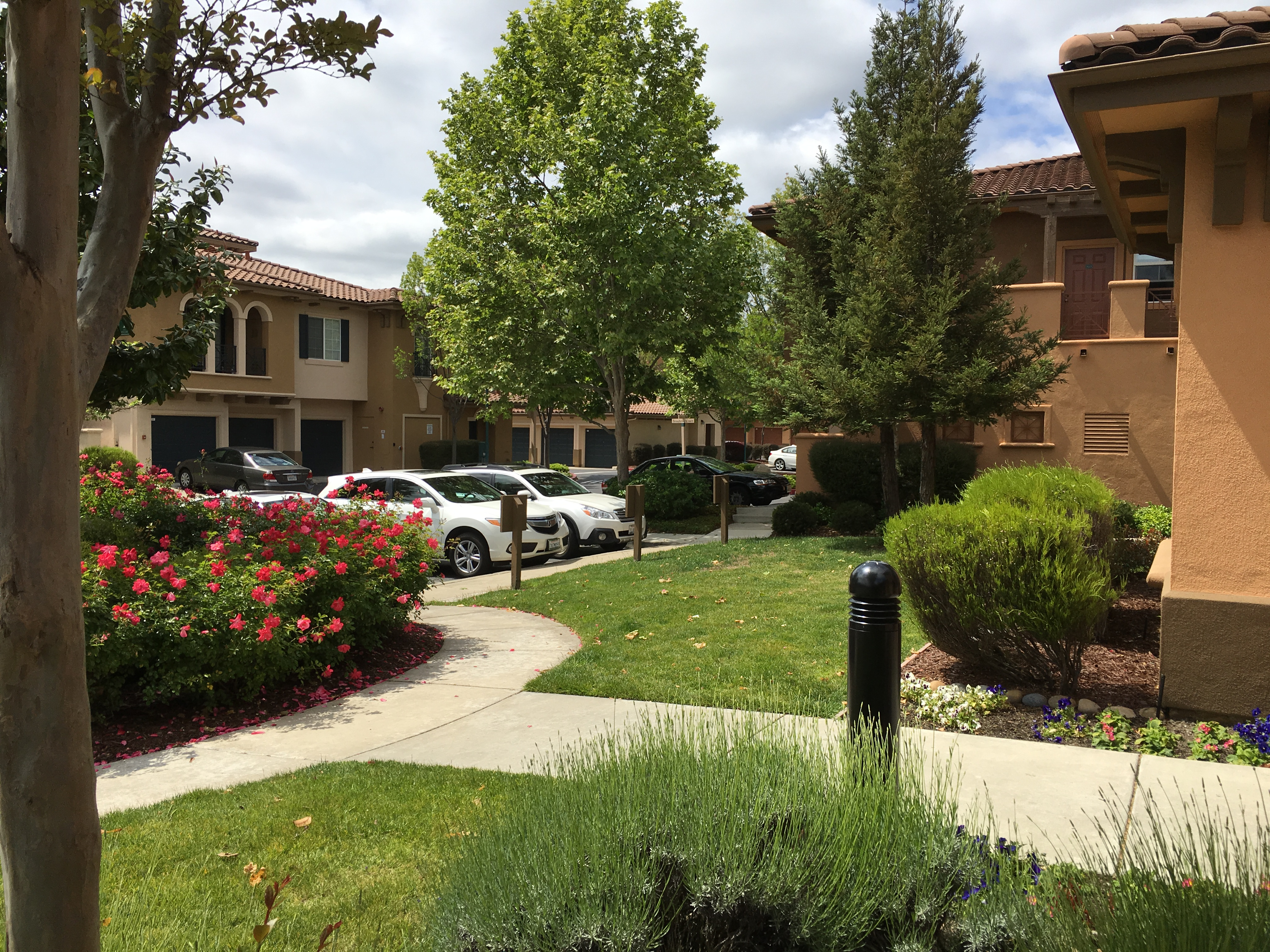
Condominiums in San Ramon, California.

Common-interest development (CID) is one of the fastest growing types of housing development scheme in the some parts of the world today. They include condominiums, community apartments, planned developments, and stock cooperatives.

== Benefits ==
A CID's ownership benefits are having rights to an undivided interest in common areas and amenities that might prove to be too expensive to be solely owned. For example, an owner would like to have a pool but cannot afford one. When buying a condominium with a pool in a CID of one hundred units, an owner would have use of that pool for basically one-hundredth of the cost due to sharing the cost with the other 99 owners. Timeshare, or vacation ownership, is the same concept. Buying a second home for vacation purposes might not be financially possible; buying a week or two can be when sharing the overall costs with other participants.

Within the United States, when a CID is developed, the developer is required to incorporate (in a form) a homeowner association (HOA) prior to any property sales. The role of the HOA is to manage the CID once the control is transferred from the developer. The HOA governs the CID based upon the incorporated covenants, conditions, and restrictions (CC&Rs) which were recorded when the property was subdivided. The CC&Rs will outline the financial budgeting guideline for the HOA in determining the dollar amount in maintenance fees for assessing the owners. In a wholly owned CID, maintenance fees would normally be assessed on a monthly basis.

== Growth ==
The following table shows the spread of Common Interest Developments in the United States.

Spread of common interest developments
	CIDs	Housing units (in millions)	Residents (in millions)
1970	10,000	0.7	2.1
1980	36,000	3.6	9.6
1990	130,000	11.6	29.6
2000	222,500	17.8	45.2
2010	311,600	24.8	62.0
2017	344,500	26.6	70.0

According to the Community Associations Institute, between 22 and 24 percent of the entire U.S. population in 2017 lived in community associations. The two leading states with CIDs are California, where around 9,327,000 people lived in a CID, and Florida, where about 9,753,000 lived in a Community Interest Development.

== Criticisms ==
In his 2019 Devane Lecture series at Yale University, Professor Ian Shapiro identified three primary threats to American democracy posed by the spread of CIDs.

=== Undemocratic boards ===
The CID Boards are often undemocratic. HOA board members are selected prior to the construction of the development and are only very rarely elected to their positions. However, in their communities, they take on the responsibilities and functions of municipal government officials.

=== Effects on homelessness ===
"As seen in Albert O. Hirschman's Exit, Voice, and Loyalty, there are problems here about entry, because if all of the housing in parts of the country are built in these developments and can pick [the type of consumers they will] serve, what about homeless people? Where are homeless people going to wind up? They're going to wind up on the streets of San Francisco or somewhere like that. Because if you want to buy into one of these residences, they don't want you unless they can ensure you can pay. You're going to go through financial screening. You're going to have to prove you can afford to live in the place. People who can't are going to wind up not getting served. If you try to do housing through this type of market, there's going to be a market failure that's probably going to be quite costly for governments."

=== Segmented democracy ===
"Douglas W. Rae has an essay titled Democratic Liberty and the Tyrannies of Place, which points to the fact that we're becoming an increasingly segmented democracy. That is, people tend to spend time around people that are like themselves. Of course, CIDs greatly facilitate that because people will sort by income or go to the ones in Florida, often by ethnic group - into these relatively homogenous certainly financially homogenous, groups. We know from Cass R. Sunstein that like-minded people, if they talk to one another, tend to become more extreme. So if we get an increasingly segmented democracy of people only hanging around people who look and talk like themselves, this will reinforce a lot of the divisions contributing to the polarization of the electorate. This reinforces the "out of sight, out of mind" mentality about people not like themselves."
