= Private rented sector =

The private rented sector (PRS) is a classification of United Kingdom housing tenure as described by the Ministry of Housing, Communities and Local Government, a UK government department that monitors the national housing supply.

Other classifications are:

- Owner-occupied
- Rented from registered social landlords (housing association)
- Rented from local authorities

In 2014 the private rented sector consisted of 2.7 million dwellings in the United Kingdom, or some 10 percent of the total housing stock. Of this total, 2.4 m were in England, representing 12 percent of the English housing stock. The sector had grown by over 10 percent in the previous ten years and, according to the Centre for Economics and Business Research, was forecast to grow by a further 40 percent over the coming ten years. However, government measures introduced by George Osborne as Chancellor of the Exchequer were aimed at reducing its size, and the sector began to shrink in 2017.

By the 2022–23 period, the sector had grown to approximately 4.6 million households in England, representing around 19 percent of all households.

== History ==
For the greater part of the 20th century the private rented sector was in long-term decline. The combination of growth in owner-occupation and the role of city councils, borough councils, and district councils as social landlords, through public housing and latterly the housing association movement, contributed to a decline in the private rented sector.

Rising prosperity and pro home-ownership HM Government policies brought owner-occupation to its peak between 1985 and 1987, whilst reducing the private rented sector. During this period owner-occupied dwellings rose by 24 percent whilst the private rented sector contracted by 10 percent.

Growth in the PRS was inhibited by a regulatory regime that discouraged landlords. Because of regulated rents, limited profitable returns and tenant legislation, the right of landlords to recover their property from a defaulting tenant, had become extensively limited.

== Regulatory change ==
This long-term decline was arrested by the Housing Act 1988. This introduced a radical reshaping of landlord and tenant law, and in particular introduced the assured shorthold tenancy (AST), and the Section 21 and Section 8 aspects. This arrangement made the contractual relationship between landlord and tenant clearer and allowed landlords to recover their property relatively easily from a defaulting tenant. However, the process still often requires recourse to Her Majesty's Courts & Tribunals Service (HMCTS), and sometimes can go to the First-tier Tribunal (Property Chamber), if there is an appeal by the landlord or tenant concerning a Section 21 notice, or a Section 8 possession order. The growth was met by tenant demand as improvements in the quality of the rental stock made being a tenant a viable option.

In 2014 Electrical Safety First and Shelter released a joint report examining current electrical conditions in the private rented sector. The report found that sixteen percent of renters have experienced problems with electrical hazards in the last year alone. The report calls for mandatory five-yearly checks of electrical installations and electrical appliances supplied with private rented sector properties by a competent person.

== Economic and social change ==
Of equal importance to the changes in legislation have been the economic and social changes that took place over the next decade. The recession which lasted from 1991 to 1992 reduced the appeal of home ownership as a complete solution for housing need, and the impact of unprecedented levels of arrears, possessions and falls in value remain etched on the national consciousness.

More recently, social changes, especially an increase in student numbers, old age pensioners (OAPs), greater labour mobility amongst young people and a rise in immigration, added to the demand for rented accommodation, causing a second growth period.

With local housing authorities unable to expand council rented housing to fill the gap and limited funding for housing associations, the newly reinvigorated private rented sector expanded in response to demand and grew by 27 percent in the 15-year period to 2004.

In 2010, the British government ran a large scale survey of the private rented sector and analysed the social and economic spread of private landlords. Some key findings were:

- 89 percent of landlords were private individual landlords responsible for 71 percent of all private rented dwellings, with a further 5 percent of landlords being company landlords responsible for 15 percent of dwellings.
- More than three quarters (78 percent) of all landlords only owned a single dwelling for rent, with only 8 percent of landlords stating they were full-time landlords.
- Over three-quarters (77 percent) of all dwellings in the private rented sector were purchased by landlords, 9 percent were inherited, and 8 percent were built by landlords.
- 51 percent of all dwellings had been acquired since 2000, 25 percent in the ten years between 1990 and 1999 and 24 percent prior to this date.
- A mortgage was used when acquiring 56 percent of dwellings in the private rented sector, with personal savings being the next most common means of finance used to acquire 21 percent of dwellings.
- 89 percent of landlords were private individual landlords, 5 percent were company landlords, and 6 percent were ‘other organisation’ landlords. These were responsible for 71 percent, 15 percent and 14 percent, respectively, of all dwellings in the sector.
- 22 percent of landlords had let properties for three years or less with two-thirds (69 percent) for 10 years or less. Only 5 percent had let for more than 40 years.
- In terms of formal letting and management practices, nearly all landlords and agents (97 percent) made use of a written tenancy agreement, with 91 percent requiring a deposit, and 84 percent requiring tenants to provide a reference.

== Arrival of institutional involvement in sector ==
Institutions such as pension funds and insurance companies have been very active in residential investment in countries such as Germany and the United States where private rented residential property accounts for a much larger part of the overall residential stock (Germany 60 per cent and US 32 per cent).

In contrast, the United Kingdom saw limited involvement until more recently, due to a long-standing fear of rent control and other reputational concerns related to the ownership of rented residential property. Since January 1990, the percentage of UK housing stock in the private rented sector has grown from 9 per cent to 19 per cent but mostly due to the growth in the residential buy to let investor, who either purchases the property outright, or applies to a bank or building society, and gets a buy-to-let mortgage on the property.

Since 2010, UK institutions have taken a serious interest in the private rented sector, in part encouraged by their positive experiences in the private student accommodation market. The potential for high and continued rental streams, linked to general inflation, has attracted institutions seeking to match their liability profiles.

Investors have looked to other more established private rental markets to identify the best practices adopted. This has seen the development of the build-to-rent (B2R) concept into the UK which follows the service-led culture of the multi-family sector in the United States.

The involvement of different investors now ranges from the individual landlords owning buy-to-let properties and houses of multiple occupation (HMO), through to various housing associations, which now provide properties for around 6 million tenants in the United Kingdom, and the property companies who operate large scale rentals, that have become the UK institutions which created the new investment market for build-to-rent properties to extensively develop. Altogether these different kinds of involvement have created a rather complex spectrum within the private rental sector.

== Decline in property investment from 2017 ==
Following changes to the taxation of landlords, with Section 24 of the Finance Act 2015, that came into effect in April 2017, the private rented sector therefore peaked at 2.88 million households and began to steadily shrink. The introduction of Section 24 removed the right of the landlord to deduct mortgage interest and other finance costs, which included mortgage arrangement fees, from their rental income before calculating their Income Tax liability, to Her Majesty's Revenue & Customs (HMRC).

In August 2018, the Royal Institution of Chartered Surveyors warned that smaller BTL landlords were being pushed out of the UK housing market by the removal of mortgage interest tax relief, stricter lending criteria, and higher Stamp Duty Land Tax (SDLT), and that rents would need to rise by some 15 percent.

By 2019, the total number of dwellings in the private rented sector had fallen by 222,570, reaching its lowest level since December 2012, when the total had been 2.58 million. As a result, three landlord associations urged the government to take action to reverse this trend.
