= Commonhold =

Property ownership arrangement in England and Wales

Commonhold is a system of property ownership in England and Wales. It involves the indefinite freehold tenure of part of a multi-occupancy building (typically a flat) with shared ownership of and responsibility for common areas and services. It has features similar to the strata title system in Australia, and condominium systems in the United States. Following a consultation by the Law Commission, it was introduced by the Commonhold and Leasehold Reform Act 2002 as an alternative to leasehold, and was the first new type of legal estate to be introduced in English law since 1925.

== Origin of the word ==
‘Commonhold’ is a term found only in the law of England and Wales. It was adopted in the Report: Commonhold: Freehold Flat and Freehold Ownership of other Interdependent Buildings: Report of a Working Group (1987) Cm 179, the working group generally called the "Aldridge Committee". This was an ad hoc committee chaired by Law Commissioner Trevor Aldridge, which was appointed in May 1986 to consider the problems raised by combined ownership of land. It reported in July 1987.

Although the term was adopted by the Committee to describe the system it proposed, which drew heavily on the strata title system then in use in Australia, the word had in fact been coined in 1978 by Sir Brandon Rhys-Williams, Conservative MP for South Kensington from 1968 until 1974 and for Kensington from 1974 until his death in May 1988. He had in 1978 introduced his “Co-ownership of Flats Bill” as a Ten Minute Rule Bill. This would have enabled leaseholders of flats to purchase the freehold of their block at a fair market value; this would then be held by a Commonhold Company in which the participating leaseholders would be shareholders. He produced similar Bills in five succeeding sessions of Parliament, from 1978/79 to 1983/84. “Commonhold” was later adopted by the Aldridge Committee to describe their strata-title system, though the system envisaged by Rhys-Williams is virtually identical to the situation – often encountered in practice – where the flats in a block remain leasehold but the leaseholders own their freehold through the medium of a Residents’ Management Company, of which they are members. The Aldridge Committee claimed to have been unaware of its previous use by Rhys-Williams.

== Nature of commonhold ==
An important difference between commonholds and leaseholds (leases) is that a commonhold is indefinite in time, unlike a leasehold which is only granted for a fixed period of time (the term). As a consequence, a commonhold title is not a depreciating asset, whereas leaseholds lose value as the end of their term (term of years or in extraneous documents sometimes existence) approaches.

== Lack of adoption ==
In the years since the 2002 Act became law, only a handful of commonholds have been registered, whilst hundreds of thousands of long leases have been granted during the same period. As of 3 June 2009, there were 12 commonhold residential developments comprising 97 units (homes) in England and one commonhold residential development comprising 30 units (homes) in Wales. By 2020, this number had not risen significantly—with under 20 developments using commonhold.

== See also ==
- Condominium
- Homeowner association
- Strata title
