= Homeowner association =

Private association of real estate property owners

A homeowner association (or homeowners' association [HOA], sometimes referred to as a property owners' association [POA], common interest development [CID], or homeowner community) is a private, legally-incorporated organization that governs a housing community, collects dues, and sets rules for its residents. They are formed either ipso jure (such as in a building with multiple owner-occupancies), or by a real estate developer for the purpose of marketing, managing, and selling homes and lots in a residential subdivision. The developer may transfer control of an HOA after selling a predetermined number of lots. These legal structures, while most common in residential developments, can also be found in commercial, industrial and mixed-use developments, in which context they are referred to as property owners' associations (POAs) or common interest developments (CIDs) instead of HOAs.

HOAs are most frequently found in the United States, Japan, Canada, Australia, and the Philippines, and to some extent in other countries, such as New Zealand, Israel, Mauritius, South Africa, most of the countries of the European Union, such as Denmark, France, Germany, Spain, the Netherlands, Ireland, Austria, Poland, Hungary, Bulgaria, Greece, Sweden, Belgium, Croatia, the Czech Republic, Latvia, Lithuania, Cyprus, Luxembourg, Estonia, Slovakia and Slovenia, and some of the Latin American countries, such as Chile, Argentina, Brazil and Mexico.

Elsewhere, one also finds concepts such as strata title (originating in Australia but since emulated by several other countries, including the Canadian provinces of Alberta and British Columbia), which are similar in principle to homeowner associations but have a different legal heritage.

In most cases, a person who wants to buy a residence within the area of an HOA must become a member, and therefore must obey the governing documents including articles of incorporation, covenants, conditions and restrictions (CC&Rs) and by-laws—which may limit the owner's choices, for example, exterior design modifications (e.g., paint colors). HOAs are especially active in urban planning, zoning, and land use—decisions that affect the pace of growth, the quality of life, the level of taxation, and the value of land in the community.

Most HOAs are incorporated, and are subject to local laws that govern non-profit corporations and HOAs. Regulatory oversight of HOAs varies from jurisdiction to jurisdiction; some jurisdictions, such as Florida and California, have a large body of HOA law. However other jurisdictions, for example Massachusetts, have limited HOA law. HOAs are commonly found in residential developments since the passage of the Davis–Stirling Common Interest Development Act in 1985. In Canada, HOAs are subject to stringent provincial regulations and are thus quite rare compared to the United States. However in recent decades, HOAs have infrequently been created in new subdivision developments in Alberta and Ontario.

The fastest-growing form of housing in the United States today are common-interest developments (CIDs), a category that includes planned unit developments of single-family homes, condominiums, and housing cooperatives. Since 1964, HOAs have become increasingly common in the United States. They have also been common in Japan, Canada and Australia since later previous years. The Community Associations Institute trade association estimated that in 2010, HOAs governed 24.8 million American homes and 62 million residents. Throughout the rest of the world, HOAs—though they do exist in some neighborhoods—are uncommon.

== Early history ==
For centuries, communities have, informally or formally, combined resources to maintain common areas, like wells or roads. However, modern HOAs established covenants and deed restrictions to dictate who could buy a home in a development. These were the children of deed restrictions in a new kind of planned subdivision, and they established the national legal precedent for zoning districts exclusively for upscale, single-family residences. Private restrictions normally included provisions such as minimum required costs for home construction.

== History in the United States ==
In the United States, the evolution of HOAs is intertwined with racism, with many HOAs excluding all non-Whites, and sometimes non-Christians as well, from occupancy, except domestic servants. In the early postwar period after World War II, many HOAs were defined to exclude African Americans and, in some cases, Jews, with Asians also excluded on the West Coast.

Some of the first HOAs were formed early in the 20th century in Los Angeles County. The Arroyo Seco Improvement Association in Pasadena was founded around 1905 by Henry Huntington, a transit magnate who developed several whites-only housing divisions. The Los Feliz Improvement Association (still in operation today) in Los Angeles was founded in 1916. A racial covenant in a Seattle, Washington, neighborhood stated, "No part of said property hereby conveyed shall ever be used or occupied by any Hebrew or by any person of the Ethiopian, Malay or any Asiatic race." In 1948, the United States Supreme Court ruled such covenants unenforceable in Shelley v. Kraemer. However, private contracts effectively kept them alive until the Fair Housing Act of 1968 prohibited such discrimination. However, by requiring approval of tenants and new owners, HOAs still have the potential to permit less formalized discrimination.

In 1963, the FHA had approved US federal home mortgage insurance exclusively for condominiums or for homes in subdivisions that had a qualifying HOA. The rationale was that developers wanted to get around density laws. The effect, however, was to divert investment from multi-family housing and home construction or renovation in the inner cities. This accelerated the middle-class exodus to the suburbs and into common-interest housing. The rapid expansion of federally subsidized highways under federal programs made access to new areas easy.

According to Donald R. Stabile, the explosion in the number of CIDs in the United States (many of which were based on homeowners' associations) was strongly influenced by a 1964 publication (TB 50) by the Urban Land Institute. This technical bulletin was funded by the National Association of Home Builders and by certain federal agencies: the FHA, the United States Public Health Service, the Office of Civil Defense, the Veterans Administration, and the Urban Renewal Administration.

In order to do this while still retaining a suburban look, they clustered homes around green open areas maintained by associations. These associations provided services that formerly had been provided by municipal agencies funded by property taxes. Residents of such development also had to pay their local taxes. Accordingly, local governments began promoting subdivision development as a means of improving their cash flow.

In an effort to control water pollution, the U.S. Clean Water Act of 1977 required that all new real estate developments had to detain storm water so that flow to adjoining properties was not greater than the pre-development runoff. As a result, nearly all residential developments had to construct detention or retention areas to hold excess storm water until it could be released at the pre-development flow level. Since these detention areas serve multiple residences, they are almost always designated as "common" areas. This requirement was a reason for developers to establish an HOA. Although these areas can be placed on an individual homeowner's lot, eliminating the need for an association, some U.S. municipalities now require these areas to be part of a common area to ensure an entity, rather than an individual or the municipality itself, has maintenance responsibility. Real estate developers have frequently established HOAs to maintain such common areas. Having established the HOA, the developers have expanded their scope, giving them authority to regulate changes to residences, landscaping and maintenance requirements, color of houses, etc., a variety of other requirements and amenities that the developers believe will make their project more desirable to the market.

In the US, the Community Associations Institute (CAI) is a trade association of individuals and businesses that sell supplies or services to HOAs, and is dominated by lawyers and HOA managers. The CAI does not represent HOAs. It lobbies the legislatures of states that have HOAs in order to promote legislation beneficial to its interests.

== Operation ==
Although in some cases membership in an HOA may be voluntary for a property owner, in the majority of cases membership in an HOA is mandatory. Once an owner purchases property within the subdivision, that owner becomes a mandatory member of the HOA, and must pay assessments to, and abide by the rules of, the HOA.

In return, the owner/member is permitted to participate in the HOA's governance and use the amenities offered by the HOA, provided that they are current on assessments (or on a payment plan to become current). Once an owner sells or otherwise transfers interest in all the property owned within the HOA, the owner ceases to be a member of the HOA and loses all rights previously held.

=== Governance ===
Usually HOAs are structured as private corporations or private unincorporated associations (commonly as non-profit ones). However, despite usually being a non-profit corporation, they are not tax-exempt, and payments to them cannot be deducted for income tax purposes. HOAs are governed by federal and state statutes applicable to corporations (or unincorporated associations if so structured), as well as the HOA's own "governing documents".

The HOA's governing documents generally "run with the land", which means that all current and future owners of property within the HOA will be bound by them as a condition of property ownership. They usually include:

- The covenants, conditions, and restrictions (CC&Rs) of the subdivision. These are likely the most important documents affecting the subdivision and are usually created when the subdivision is initially formed, and as such are often recorded in the official property records of the county or other jurisdiction where the subdivision is located. Commonly the CC&Rs specify what types of structures can be placed on a lot (e.g. an upscale community may prohibit mobile homes or travel trailers and require minimum sizes on dwellings, along with offsets from the property line where building is prohibited) and other property restrictions (e.g. no animals except for traditional household pets, no operation of commercial business).
- The HOA's articles of incorporation and bylaws
- In some cases, the documents may include board-enacted rules as authorized (expressly or implicitly) by the CC&Rs.

Generally, CC&Rs are enforceable as legal documents. However, there are instances where a CC&R is rendered illegal by later enacted state or federal law and therefore is no longer enforceable. For example, a developer-drafted covenant giving the developer sole rights to amend the CC&Rs was declared unenforceable as a matter of public policy in at least one state, where the developer attempted to amend years after he had sold all the property. That state's legislature later codified that public policy. Other examples include CC&Rs which prohibited sales of property to certain racial groups; the Fair Housing Act rendered all of these also to be unconstitutional and unenforceable.

=== Board of directors ===
The HOA will be governed by a board of directors.

Initially, the board is composed of developer-appointed members, in order to maintain the character of the community that the developer has for it. As the percentage of ownership shifts from the developer toward owners, the corresponding percentage changes from developer-appointed members to homeowners elected at an annual meeting, and ultimately the board will consist solely of homeowner-elected members.

Usually, the board (or parts of it) will be elected at an annual meeting of the homeowners, as specified in the bylaws. In order to avoid an owner of multiple lots (who likely own the lots for resale or rental property) controlling the HOA's operation (to the detriment of those owners who only own a single lot or two contiguous lots as a current or future residence or vacation home), the bylaws may limit all owners (regardless of the number of lots owned) to one or two votes per owner.

Depending on the state, board meetings may be required to be open to the public, except in instances where a board may enter into an "executive session" for discussion on confidential matters (e.g. discussions with its attorney on an upcoming lawsuit).

The board of directors makes decisions regarding the HOA, including management of the HOA's finances, protecting the HOA's real and intangible assets (generally the amenities provided which were the basis for inducing people to purchase lots), and enforcing the governing documents. Boards of directors have a fiduciary duty to the property owners; violation of that duty may result in liability for individual directors, and as such the HOA will often adopt an ethics code for the board members to ensure they act ethically and in accordance with their responsibilities. To gain a clear understanding of the responsibilities of the HOA board, community members need to read their association's CC&Rs, articles of incorporation, bylaws, and other rules.

=== Association management ===
Many HOAs (especially larger ones with more upscale amenities) hire management companies to handle the governing duties of the association.

Management services are typically divided into three categories: financial only, full management, and on-site management. Financial services typically cover administration of bank accounts, bookkeeping, assessment collection, and the HOAs budget. Full management typically includes the financial services plus help with board meetings (keeping minutes, agendas, etc.), board elections, and maintenance duties (obtaining contractor bids, etc.). On-site management typically includes all of the full management services plus direct assistance to homeowners with an assigned manager to the HOA.

Education requirements for managers varies from jurisdiction to jurisdiction, with some requiring certification under all circumstances and others having a more lenient approach. For instance, while California does not require HOA managers to be certified, it does require that managers meet certain educational requirements to claim certification.

=== Powers ===
Through its board an HOA will provide some level of amenities (though differing greatly between HOAs), regulate activities within a development, levy assessments, and may (if authorized by CC&Rs or a state legislature) impose fines for noncompliance.

Depending on the governing documents, HOA boards may create committees, such as an "architectural control committee" (this is a very common one, and frequently this committee has the ultimate authority to approve or deny a building request), a pool committee, a neighborhood watch committee, etc.

Depending on the governing documents or state law, the HOA may have the authority to place liens on a property (for non-payment of assessments and/or noncompliance with CC&Rs, an example would be the costs to remove a non compliant structure such as a mobile home on a lot restricted to "site built" housing) and to, ultimately, foreclose on it.

Homeowners have the ability to defend against such actions, and are usually entitled to sue HOAs for contractual or statutory violations, or for a legal determination as to the enforceability of a provision in the governing documents. However, because HOAs are private associations, they are not considered "state actors" subject to constitutional constraints, and therefore homeowners cannot sue for civil rights violations under 42 U.S.C. 1983.

The major power of the HOA is the ability to compel property owners to pay a share of common expenses for the overall maintenance of the HOA and the amenities, usually proportionate to the ownership interests (either by unit or based on square footage). These expenses generally arise from the operation and maintenance of common property, which vary dramatically depending on the type of association. An HOA may have, in addition to a regular assessment, a "special" assessment for unexpected expenses (such as for road maintenance).

The assessment may be paid monthly, quarterly, or annually; generally the more amenities provided the more frequent the assessment must be paid. Some associations operate little or no common property, and the expenses relate solely to enforcement of use restrictions or assumed services. Others are effectively private towns, with elaborate amenities including private roads, street lights, services, utilities, commonly owned buildings, pools, and even schools. Assessments paid to HOAs in the United States amount to billions of dollars a year, but are not classed as property taxes.

When determining what the assessment should be, it is important to consider what funds are required. There should always be a minimum of two funds: an operating fund and a reserve fund. The operating fund is used to pay for the operating expenses of the association. A reserve fund is used to pay for the infrequent and expensive common area assets maintenance, repair and replacement costs. The reserve fund is crucial for reducing the chances of a special assessment (mentioned in the risks below). Obtaining a reserve study is recommended to help determine and set the reserve contribution rate which is included in the regular monthly assessment.

== Effects ==
According to a 2019 study in the Journal of Labor Economics, "houses in HOAs have prices that are on average at least 4%, or $13,500, greater than observably similar houses outside of HOAs. The HOA premium correlates with the stringency of local land use regulation, local government spending on public goods, and measures of social attitudes toward race." The study also found that people in HOA neighborhoods "are on average more affluent and racially segregated than those living in other nearby neighborhoods."

=== For homeowners ===
The perception of the benefits that an HOA provides to homeowners varies depending on the specific regulations and practices of the HOA. These benefits may include amenities (eg. a pool, tennis courts, clubhouse, and open areas). Individuals may also benefit more or less depending on their political standing in the association and the degree to which the community's decisions match their preferences. In the 1994 court case Nahrstedt v. Lakeside Village Condominium Assn., the California Supreme Court noted:

"...Owners associations 'can be a powerful force for good or for ill' in their members' lives. Therefore, anyone who buys a unit in a common interest development with knowledge of its owners association's discretionary power accepts 'the risk that the power may be used in a way that benefits the commonality but harms the individual.'"

Benefits to homeowners may include maintenance and management services, provision of recreational amenities such as pools and parks, insurance coverage, enforcement of community appearance standards which may lead to higher property values, and the opportunity for members to plan development in accordance with community values.

Disadvantages to homeowners may include the financial burden of association fees, punitive fines, and costs of maintaining appearance standards; restrictions on property use and personal autonomy; and the potential for mismanagement by the board, including the possibility of arbitrary or heavy-handed enforcement of rules.

=== For the municipality ===
Many municipalities have welcomed HOAs in the belief that they may reduce operational costs for the local government. Since the homeowners sometimes pay for roads, parks, and other services within the development, the local government may believe it can gain revenue from property taxes from owners in a development that costs the municipality little or nothing.

A 2009 study of California HOAs suggested that this assumption was partially true, but that the overall effect of HOAs on municipalities was mixed. While HOAs did offset the costs of city governments to a small degree, they also reduced overall tax revenues because their members, insulated from the larger community, tended to vote down taxes that the city required to fund services. This led to an overall decrease in government expenditures that disproportionately affected those citizens who did not reside in an HOA.

As the study noted,

"...critics of private governments claim that HOAs erode support for public institutions. Those who join can bypass the public system: homeowners who fear crime do not have to vote for tax dollars to attack the root of the problem; they can build a gate to keep the criminals out. Opponents maintain that the erosion of public support, reflected at the ballot box, leads to further deterioration of municipal services and reductions in local revenues. Nonmembers experience a reduction in public service levels and may be worse off. At the extreme, HOAs may contribute to sentiments of secession and withdrawal from the public sector."

=== For real estate developers ===
Real estate developers establish HOAs in the belief that they can contribute to the developer's ability to build and sell units profitably. Providing common amenities may enable developers to build at a higher density, if the local government has encouraged such results. In addition, by relieving municipalities of the costs of road and utility maintenance, developers may obtain more favorable terms. Ordinarily, the developer retains some control over the HOA until a specified number of units are sold, and the covenants, conditions, and restrictions of the HOA are put in place to further this goal.

The potential disadvantage to a developer is that they may be exposed to liability to the HOA for poor construction, misleading marketing, or other problems. In these cases, the HOA may sue the developer.

=== Regulations ===
In The Voluntary City, published by the libertarian Independent Institute, Donald J. Boudreaux and Randall G. Holcombe note that the association's creator (e.g. a developer) has an incentive to set up a government structured in such a way as to maximize profits and thus increase the selling price of the property. If a certain decision would increase the selling price of certain parcels and decrease the selling price of others, the developer will choose the option that yields his project the highest net income. This may result in sub-optimal outcomes for the homeowners.

== Criticisms ==
=== Voting ===
HOAs established a new community as a municipal corporation. Voting in an HOA is based on property ownership, By the 1970s, only property owners were eligible to vote, while renters are prohibited from directly voting for the unit. They could, however, deal directly with their landlords under their lease contract, since that is the party who has responsibility to them. In the 1973 book Federally Assisted Communities: New Dimensions in Urban Development, author Hugh Mields, Jr. raised questions about the constitutionality of having an association that had the authority of a municipal government, despite being private in nature.

Additionally, voting representation is equal to the proportion of ownership, not to the number of people. The majority of property owners may be absentee landlords, whose values or incentives may not be aligned with the tenants'. However, some HOAs limit owners of multiple properties to one or two votes regardless of the number of lots owned, so absentee owners do not end up controlling the HOA to the detriment of residents who only own a single lot or two contiguous lots as a current or future residence or vacation home.

In some HOAs, the developer may have multiple votes for each lot it retains, but the homeowners are limited to only one vote per lot owned. This has been justified on the grounds that it allows residents to avoid decision costs until major questions about the development process already have been answered and that as the residual claimant, the developer has the incentive to maximize the value of the property.

=== Restrictions ===
HOAs have been criticized for having excessively restrictive rules and regulations on how homeowners may conduct themselves and use their property.

Some of the restrictions commonly put into place by HOAs are limiting the length of grass, number of cars on a property, what animals an owner may have on their property, the maximum volume for playing music at certain times of day, what signs may be displayed on their property, and what plants can be planted.

Homeowners have challenged political speech restrictions in associations that federal or state constitutional guarantees as rights, claiming that certain private associations are de facto municipal governments and should therefore be subject to the same legal restrictions.

In 2002, the 11th Circuit Court of Appeals, in Loren v. Sasser, declined to extend Shelley beyond racial discrimination and disallowed a challenge to an association's prohibition of "for sale" signs. In Loren, the court ruled that outside the racial covenant context, it would not view judicial enforcement of a private contract as state action, but as private action, and accordingly would disallow any First Amendment relief.

In the Twin Rivers case, a group of homeowners collectively called The Committee for a Better Twin Rivers sued the association, for a mandatory injunction permitting homeowners to post political signs and strike down the political signage restrictions by the association as unconstitutional. The appeals court held the restrictions on political signs unconstitutional and void, but the appeals court was reversed when the New Jersey Supreme Court overturned the appellate court's decision in 2007 and reinstated the decision of the trial court.

=== Financial risk for homeowners ===
In some U.S. states (such as Texas) an HOA can foreclose a member's house without any judicial procedure in order to collect special assessments, fees and fines, or otherwise place an enforceable lien on the property which, upon the property's sale, allows the HOA to collect otherwise unpaid assessments. In 2008, a soldier, who was serving in Iraq, was informed that his fully paid-for, $300,000 home in Frisco, Texas had been foreclosed on and sold for $3,500 to recover unpaid HOA dues of $800. In 2010, the case was settled and the soldier regained ownership of the home. The Servicemembers Civil Relief Act may have been his defense; however, a gag order prevents details from being known.

Other states, like Florida, require a judicial hearing. Foreclosure without a judicial hearing can occur when a "power of sale clause" exists in a mortgage or deed of trust.

A self-published report by a professor at the University of Washington disputes the claim that HOAs protect property values, stating, based on a survey of Harris County, Texas (which had an unusual legal regime regarding foreclosures): "Although HOA foreclosures are ostensibly motivated by efforts to improve property values, neither foreclosure activity nor HOAs appear linked with the above average home price growth."

HOA boards can also collect special assessments from its members in addition to set fees, sometimes without the homeowners' direct vote on the matter, though most states place restrictions on an association's ability to do so. Special assessments often require a homeowner-vote if the amount exceeds a prescribed limit established in the association's by-laws.

In California, for example, a special assessment can be imposed by a board, without a membership vote, only when the total assessment is five percent or less of the association's annual budget. Therefore, in the case of a 25-unit association with a $100,000 annual operating budget, the board could only impose a $5,000 assessment on the entire population ($5,000 divided by 25 units equals $200 per unit). A larger assessment would require a majority vote of the members.

In some exceptional cases, particularly in matters of public health or safety, the amount of special assessments may be at the board's discretion. If, for example there is a ruptured sewer line, the Board could vote a substantial assessment immediately, arguing that the matter affects public health and safety. In practice, however, most boards prefer that owners have a chance to voice opinions and vote on assessments.

Increasingly, HOAs handle large amounts of money. Embezzlement from associations has occurred occasionally, as a result of dishonest board members or community managers, with losses up to millions of dollars. Again, California's Davis–Stirling Act, which was designed to protect owners, requires that boards carry appropriate liability insurance to indemnify the association from any wrongdoing. The large budgets and expertise required to run such groups are a part of the arguments behind mandating manager certification (through Community Association Institute, state real estate boards, or other agencies).

In 2006, the AARP voiced concern that HOAs pose a risk to the financial welfare of their members. They have proposed that a homeowners "Bill of Rights" be adopted by all 50 states to protect seniors from rogue HOAs.

However, many HOAs introduce regular accounting audits to mitigate homeowners' financial risks. In the framework of such an inspection, an independent third-party CPA (Certified Public Accountant) conducts a comprehensive analysis of an association's financial records and accounting procedures, to determine whether they are accurate, legitimate and compliant with Generally Accepted Accounting Principles (GAAP) or other reporting frameworks. Upon completion of the planned auditing procedures, a CPA issues an official report that states an opinion regarding the organization's financial health.

In the US, auditing requirements vary from state to state, as well as from HOA to HOA. Some associations are obliged to audit their financial statements on an annual basis or once every few years. For others, it is enough to conduct a review, a compilation or an agreed-upon procedures engagement. The HOA's budget, size and terms prescribed in covenants and bylaws often act as decisive factors when determining whether an audit is obligatory for a particular board. An audit at the end of each fiscal year is deemed to be a good rule of thumb. However, the need for an unscheduled examination can arise in cases of major changes, like a transition to a new board or management company, implementation of a large-scale improvement project, receipt of a significant sum of money under unusual circumstances, suspicion of fraud or embezzlement, or other misconduct.

==== Auditing process ====
The auditing process for HOAs can be divided into four stages:

Planning
An HOA board makes an initial inquiry to an accounting specialist about the need to conduct an audit. A consultation is held to negotiate the objectives, time frame, report deadlines, and cost of the examination.

Risk assessment
A CPA determines what obstacles can float up when testing the association's accounting procedures and preparing financial statements, gauges the significance of potential problems, and finds ways to overcome them. To collect the necessary information and evaluate an HOA's financial performance, the auditor interviews board members at their office, monitors the main day-to-day operations, tests their security, and performs analytical procedures. The auditee must provide the CPA with the most recent audit report, copies of annual tax returns, current and ensuing year's budget, board minutes, covenants, bylaws, and other internal documents. The CPA tests internal controls for incoming and outgoing transactions, the maintenance of a reserve fund, the appropriateness of financing of major contracts and improvement projects, the proper disposal of funds acquired in legal cases and under other extraordinary circumstances, and the availability and accuracy of journal entries of receipts and disbursements. These issues are given the most attention, since they have the strongest influence on an HOA's financial health. Also, an auditor reaches out to third-party organizations to verify the HOA's transactions on both sides:

- Account confirmations are requested from banks to check whether the association's operational and reserve accounts contain the claimed sums.
- The same is done for loans. A CPA verifies loan balances, interest rates, repayment terms and other important details.
- The HOA's attorney is contacted to check whether the association is involved in any legal cases.

Fieldwork
The auditor conducts a profound analysis to establish relationships between the association's income statement and balance sheet. The previous year's results are compared with the current results. Since it is impossible to cover all of an HOA's transactions in an audit, a CPA selects a sample of transactions and scrutinizes details. For example, they can use a sample of outgoing transactions to verify invoices and make sure all the funds were spent as intended and properly documented. Also, an auditor can verify bank statements, reconciliations, payroll records, canceled checks, loan statements, approved contracts and leases, proof of real estate and equipment ownership, records on capital assets, supplies and inventories. If the HOA's actual financial performance deviates from the planned indicators, the auditee must provide evidence that fluctuations are not due to the board's negligence or misconduct.

Reporting
An audit report states the CPA's opinion on the HOA's financial health and its compliance with accounting documents and with generally accepted standards. There are three types of audit reports:

- Unqualified opinion: in all respects, the HOA's financial statements are accurate, legitimate, reflect the actual activity of the association and comply with GAAP.
- Qualified opinion: minor misrepresentations or deviations from GAAP were found in the HOA's accounting papers. This does not significantly influence its overall financial performance, and mistakes are easy to correct.
- Adverse opinion: accounting violations that point to fraud or the board's blatant negligence were detected.

One more option is a disclaimer of opinion, a document compiled when a CPA is unable to issue an audit report due to conflicting interests with an HOA, non-provision of the requested financial documents, or significant uncertainty in the association's accounting operations.

Improvement recommendations in an audit report can be used to fix the board's past mistakes, establish internal discipline, and adopt more effective accounting practices. Also, audited financial statements serve as evidence of the board's good faith and sound strategies when reporting to unit owners, investors, potential real estate buyers, tenants and other interested parties.

Repeat audits
The need for a repeat audit may arise if the board has received an adverse opinion and wants to restore its good name in the eyes of shareholders and investors. After issues revealed in the initial audit are fixed, a repeat examination is conducted according to the standard scenario.

=== Other ===
Some scholars and officials of the AARP have charged that, in a variety of ways, HOAs suppress the rights of their residents. Due to court decisions, describing HOAs as a kind of private entity, HOA boards of directors are not bound by constitutional restrictions on governments—although they are de facto a level of government.

Corporation and HOA laws provide a limited role for HOA homeowners. Unless either statutory law or the corporation's governing documents reserve a particular issue or action for approval by the members, corporation laws provide that the activities and affairs of a corporation shall be conducted and "all corporate powers shall be exercised" by or under the direction of the board of directors. Many boards are operated outside of their state's non-profit corporation laws. Knowledge of corporate laws and state statutes is essential to properly managing an HOA.

Once notified by a homeowner, attorney or other government official that an HOA organization is not meeting the state's statutes, the board has the responsibility to correct their governance. Certain states, such as Texas, permit misdemeanor charges to be filed against a non-compliant board and permit lawsuits to be filed against the board and the HOA. In some instances, a known failure to rectify the board's governance to meet the state's statutes can open the board's members to personal liability as most insurance policies indemnifying the board members against legal action do not cover willful misconduct.

== Board misconduct ==
The New Jersey Department of Community Affairs reported these observations of association board conduct:

"It is obvious from the complaints [to DCA] that that [home]owners did not realize the extent association rules could govern their lives."

"Curiously, with rare exceptions, when the State has notified boards of minimal association legal obligation to owners, they dispute compliance. In a disturbing number of instances, those owners with board positions use their influence to punish other owners with whom they disagree. The complete absence of even minimally required standards, training or even orientations for those sitting on boards and the lack of independent oversight is readily apparent in the way boards exercise control"

Overwhelmingly ... the frustrations posed by the duplicative complainants or by the complainants' misunderstandings are dwarfed by the pictures they reveal of the undemocratic life faced by owners in many associations. Letters routinely express a frustration and outrage easily explainable by the inability to secure the attention of boards or property managers, to acknowledge no less address their complaints. Perhaps most alarming is the revelation that boards, or board presidents desirous of acting contrary to law, their governing documents or to fundamental democratic principles, are unstoppable without extreme owner effort and often costly litigation.

Certain states are pushing for more checks and balances in HOAs. The North Carolina Planned Community Act, for example, requires a due process hearing to be held before any homeowner may be fined for a covenant violation. It also limits the amount of the fine and sets other restrictions.

California law has strictly limited the prerogatives of boards by requiring hearings before fines can be levied and then reducing the size of such fines even if the owner-members do not appear. In California, any rule change made by the board is subject to a majority affirmation by the membership if only five percent of the membership demand a vote. This part of the civil code also ensures that any dissenting individual who seeks a director position must be fully represented to the membership and that all meetings be opened and agenda items publicized in advance. In states like Massachusetts, there are no laws to prohibit unilateral changes to the documents by the association board.

== Double taxation ==
Most homeowners are subject to property taxation, whether or not said property is located in a planned unit development governed by an HOA. Such taxes are used by local municipalities to maintain roads, street lighting, parks, etc. In addition to municipal property taxes, individuals who own private property located within planned unit developments are subject to association assessments that are used by the development to maintain the private roads, street lighting, landscaping, security, and amenities located within the planned unit development.

A non-HOA property owner pays taxes to fund street repairs performed by the city. The HOA property owners pay these same taxes, and benefit from their use of public roads, etc. without the local government (i.e. taxpayers) having to pay for the HOA's private roads, etc. which the non-HOA property owner cannot use. The proliferation of planned unit developments has resulted in a cost savings to local governments in two ways. One, by requiring developers to build 'public improvements' such as parks, passing the cost of maintenance of the improvements to the common-interest owners; and two, by planned-unit developments being responsible for the cost of maintaining infrastructures that would normally be maintained by the municipality.

== Limits to powers ==
In June 2012, the Supreme Court of Virginia ruled in the case Shadowood Condominium Association et al. v. Fairfax County Redevelopment and Housing Authority that an HOA's power to fine owners for rule violations (including being in arrears) is limited to those expressly provided in the HOA's valid governing documents (e.g. the HOA's bylaws).

Prior to the Telecommunications Act of 1996, HOAs could limit or prohibit installation of satellite dishes. Many communities still have these rules in their CC&Rs, but after October 1996, they are no longer enforceable. With a few exceptions, any homeowner may install a satellite dish of a size of one meter or smaller in diameter (larger dishes are protected in Alaska). While HOAs may encourage that dishes be placed as inconspicuously as possible, the dish must be allowed to be placed where it may receive a usable signal.

Many HOAs have restrictive covenants preventing a homeowner from installing an OTA (over-the-air) rooftop antenna. These restrictions are also no longer enforceable, except in some instances. For example: the antenna may be installed at any location unless it imposes upon common property. Also, the antenna must be of a design to receive local, not long-distance signals and must not extend any higher than twelve feet above the top roof-line of the home, unless an exception is granted by the HOA due to extenuating terrestrial interference.

In Florida, state law prohibits covenants and deed restrictions from prohibiting "Florida-Friendly Landscaping," a type of xeriscaping. In spite of the law, at least one homeowner has faced harassment and threat of fines from an HOA for having insufficient grass after landscaping his yard to reduce water usage. Similar legislation was introduced and passed by the legislature in Colorado but was vetoed by governor Bill Owens. Residents in Colorado have continued to call for regulation to protect xeriscaping, citing HOAs that require the use of grasses that consume large quantities of water and threaten fines for those who do not comply with the covenants.

== Alternative to CIDs ==
An alternative to HOAs is the multiple-tenant income property (MTIP). HOAs and MTIPs have fundamentally different forms of governance. In a CID, dues are paid to a nonprofit association. In an MTIP, ground rents are paid to a landowner, who decides how to spend it.

In both cases, certain guidelines are set out by the covenant or the lease contract. In the latter scenario, the landowner has a stronger incentive to maximize the value of all the governed property in the long term (because they are the residual claimant of it all) and to keep the residents happy, since their income is dependent on their continued patronage. These factors are cited as arguments in favor of MTIPs.

== See also ==
- Association law
- Business improvement district
- Commonhold
- Comparison of homeowner associations and civic associations
- Davis–Stirling Common Interest Development Act
- Gated community
- Housing society
- Racketeering
