= Landlord harassment =

Willing act of landlord to induce contract abandonment

Landlord harassment is the willing creation, by a landlord or their agents, of conditions that are uncomfortable for one or more tenants in order to induce willing abandonment of a rental contract. This is illegal in many jurisdictions, either under general harassment laws or specific protections, as well as under the terms of rental contracts or tenancy agreements.

This kind of activity can be more common in regions where rent control laws apply to tenancies, with rent-controlled prices not extending to the subsequent tenancy, thus allowing landlords to set higher prices when the current tenant leaves.

Harassment of tenants may include practices such as withholding maintenance, assault, verbal harassment, or written harassment. One example is sexual harassment, also known as "sex for rent". This practice involves landlords letting properties, rooms, or other accommodations to people in return for sexual favours. This issue has been raised by both UK media and MPs, with the then Secretary of State for Justice, David Lidington, suggesting that such arrangements are in breach of the Sexual Offences Act 2003, stating, "an offense is committed when a person offers accommodation as they are inciting/causing another person to have sex with them in return for 'payment'".

== Types ==
Methods employed in cases of landlord harassment include but are not limited to the following:

- Withholding maintenance on the property, such as garbage collection, landscaping, or repair of broken fixtures
- Verbal and written complaints imagined or exaggerated, of tenant's supposed improper conduct (see eviction)
- Deliberate defacing of the rented facilities or the property of the tenant
- Creating a nuisance for the tenant (for example, by generating loud noise)
- Intimidation and threats of physical or financial injury directed at the tenant
- Physical assault or other direct criminal activity directed against the tenant
- Attempt to enter apartment or housing without cause, or without emergency need to check on-premises or on tenant activity
- Claiming emergency when no emergency exists to enter the apartment, housing, dwelling etc., without proper notice.
- Not letting tenant peace on property via repeated attempts to enter a dwelling.
- Harassment about rent not paid, or not paid in full.
- Disconnecting water supply or electricity, without proper notice
- Sexual harassment including "sex for rent"
- Harassment with the intention to evict a tenant: "Retaliatory eviction"
- Disconnection the phone line
- Use of construction to harass tenants

== Protections ==
At common law tenants were entitled to the "quiet enjoyment" of leased premises. American common law has also adopted the "warranty of habitability" which ensures that residential premises remain in repair.

In the United Kingdom and the Commonwealth, the Human Rights Act may provide a basis to establish what is fair and reasonable between tenant and landlord. The right to private and family life, and the right to enjoy one's possessions, are enshrined in this law. The right to an effective remedy and the right to express oneself freely should give the tenant the confidence to seek timely and reasonable resolution should they be suffering or under duress. Although human rights legislation is generally only enforceable against public bodies, it provides a framework of reasonability.

Depending on the specific circumstances, United Kingdom legislation such as the Public Order Act 1986 and the Fraud Act 2006 may provide specific remedies. Both common law and public order legislation make it an offence for persons to behave wrongfully in a dwelling e.g. breach of the peace. Fraud legislation makes it an offence for a person to make a wrongful or forced gain (monetary or other) personally or for the body they represent.

Many local jurisdictions have specific landlord-tenant legislation that outlines the duties of the landlord, a breach of which may be considered "harassment". For example, in California, Civil Code Section 1954, limits the landlord's right of entry, in New Mexico, there is an extensive "Owner-Resident Relations Act" and in New York City, a Certification Of No Harassment (COHN) is required to make any occupancy alterations.

== Reasonable entry by the landlord ==
In any case, the purpose of the inspection must be clear, and the conduct of the inspection must be properly regulated. The purpose of any inspection is to ensure the integrity and good maintenance of the property, and the adherence to the agreement that exists between landlord and tenant. Entry into a dwelling does not give the landlord the right to gather information on, or to investigate, or interfere with, the privacy of the tenant. Any installation of surveillance equipment, such as video cameras, must be reported to the residents and/or landlords; this surveillance is only permitted in common areas, meaning video cameras are not permitted in rooms with added expectations of privacy such as bedrooms and bathrooms. Short term occupancy, such as residing in an Airbnb, is also protected from voyeurism/surveillance under the same expectations: hosts/landlords must warn guests/renters of video cameras and these devices are limited to common areas.

Commercial landlords can not harass their tenant by interfering with the entryway of a commercial building in any manner including creating real or metaphorical barriers. An example of a real barrier would be boarding up the store while an example of a metaphorical barrier would be failing to remove snow from the sidewalks.

== Frequency of landlord visits ==
Unless carrying out repairs, replacements and other work, the landlord is to limit the timing and frequency of entries to the minimum possible.

== Landlord entering the unit ==
Once an individual has rented an apartment, they have legal possession of it for the duration of their tenancy.

Originally, in an agricultural society, the law expected the landlord to rent the property to a tenant and then leave the tenant alone. It gave the landlord no right of access, but also no responsibility for repairs. The modern urban tenancy, especially in a multi-unit building with many building-wide systems, has forced that law to change. The landlord now has an obligation to make repairs and gets a right of access for that purpose. But that does not supersede the tenant's rights to privacy and to "quiet enjoyment" of the premises.

One of the most common landlord-tenant disputes involves access for making repairs. Various countries have regulations that make reference to codes or hazards. These codes and hazards vary depending on the jurisdiction of the state or country.

In one documented case, a tenant came back from his vacation and found someone else living in his apartment, with his furniture stored in the cellar.

== Retaliation ==
Retaliation has been a problem and some governments have introduced specific legislation to tackle this. In England & Wales Retaliatory eviction legislation has been introduced under the Deregulation Act 2015 under section 33.

A landlord cannot try to evict a tenant, raise the rent, or change the terms of the tenancy because the tenant has complained in writing to the landlord, or to any government agency, regarding conditions. The landlord also cannot retaliate in this fashion because a tenant has organized or joined a tenant union, or engaged in certain other protected activities. Within six months after a tenant has engaged in any of these protected activities, any act by the landlord of raising the rent, attempting eviction (except for non-payment), or making any change in any of the terms of tenancy is presumed to be retaliation. This means that in any court proceeding, the burden will be on the landlord to prove that he or she is not retaliating against the tenant. In order to defeat a retaliation claim, a landlord must convince the court that he or she took the action for reasons independent of the tenant's protected action and that he or she would have done the same thing at the same time even if the tenant hadn't engaged in the protected activity. If the landlord waits until six months after protected actions, retaliation may still be found, but the burden of proof is on the tenant.

If a landlord is found to be retaliating, he or she will not be able to evict the tenant, who may also be awarded damages from the landlord of one to three months' rent plus attorney's fees. The landlord also cannot willfully deprive the tenant of heat, hot water, gas, electricity, lights, water, or refrigeration service. Nor can the landlord lock out the tenant or remove him/her from their apartment without going through the proper court procedure. The tenant can ask the court to issue a restraining order, file a criminal complaint against the landlord, or sue him/her for money damages and attorney's fees. Because of these options for recourse, it may be to the tenant's advantage to complain about code violations in writing before the landlord issues a notice of eviction or a rent increase. If a tenant in England & Wales attempts to claim retaliation but did not complain about the breach until after receiving notice from the landlord, the tenant will be found to have no valid claim under the Retaliatory eviction legislation

== Consumer protection law ==
Consumer protection laws provide protection against landlord harassment in some states. One such statute is Chapter 93A of the Massachusetts General Laws, commonly called the "Consumer Protection Law". Like the Federal Trade Commission Act on which it is based, and similar "baby FTC" laws in other states, it prohibits the use of any unfair and deceptive acts and practices in the conduct of any trade or business. Housing rental is generally considered to be a trade or business, and the Massachusetts Attorney General has issued regulations which define unfair and deceptive acts or practices in the rental housing field. Practices defined as unfair include failure by the landlord to disclose, to a tenant or prospective tenant, any fact of the disclosure of which may have influenced the latter not to enter into the transaction. Also defined as an unfair practice is any violation of any law meant to protect consumers and any act which is oppressive or otherwise unconscionable in any respect. While the Consumer Protection Law provides some protections for tenants, if a landlord is the owner-occupant of a two-family or three-family house and owns no other rental property, he or she is not considered to be engaged in a trade or business, and is not subject to this law.

In accordance with ch.186, §15B of the Massachusetts General Laws the security deposit is to be deposited into an escrow account and each tenant is to be notified the amount of the escrow account, where it was deposited and how much interest it had earned once a year on the anniversary of the date on which the security deposit was made. The landlord is liable in damages if he fails to return the security deposit plus interest at the rate of five percent.

=== Santa Monica ===
In 2015, the City of Santa Monica enacted the Tenant Harassment Ordinance, defining tenant harassment broadly to include actions such as shutting off utilities, failing to perform repairs, issuing false notices, and making threats to intimidate tenants into vacating their homes. Santa Monica has long been known for its tenant protections, including strict rent control laws and ordinances aimed at curbing illegal evictions. In response to increasing reports of landlord harassment—particularly targeting low-income and rent-controlled tenants—the City enacted stronger measures and began a series of lawsuits to hold property owners accountable. Santa Monica anti-harassment lrequire landlords to pay attorney fees. In one case, a judge for the California Superior Court placed defendants on a 12-month diversion program. In another case, the City of Santa Monica sued a landlord for "intentionally discriminating against his tenant based on disability."

=== New York ===
The 2016 New York commercial ordinance prevents a landlord from taking actions that will cause a commercial tenant to vacate their property or to surrender any rights. In the decision of a lawsuit, the New York Attorney General cited acts of significance that "interfere with or disturb the comfort, repose, peace or quiet of any tenant or resident of the apartment or was designed to get the tenant or resident to vacate of surrender the apartment". In one case, a prominent New York City landlord, repeatedly listed among the city’s worst for harassing rent-stabilized tenants, was criminally charged in 2016 with fraud, grand larceny, and tax violations for illegally forcing tenants out to raise rents. In 2017, the landlord pleaded guilty to felony fraud and agreed to an $8 million settlement, including $3 million in tenant restitution, relinquishing management of 140 buildings, and paying penalties to prosecutors.

== See also ==
- Arizona Tenants Advocates
- Landlord–tenant law
- Rent regulation
- Right to housing
- Slumlord
