= Cure or quit =

In landlord–tenant law, a notice to cure or quit is issued by a landlord when a tenant performs actions in violation of a lease. The notice gives a tenant the option of either fixing the offending problem or vacating the rental property. If the tenant continues performing the action(s) and does not move out, they can be evicted.

The term is sometimes also used in the debt-collection business to indicate to an account in arrears that action may be taken against the account holder if the debt is not rectified. The account holder may be sent a "Notice to cure or quit" to let them know the status of the account.

Depending on the jurisdiction, such a notice may be legally required before further action may take place, such as (in the case of landlord vs. tenant) being able to file an eviction suit.
