= Slumlord =

Derogatory term for a landlord

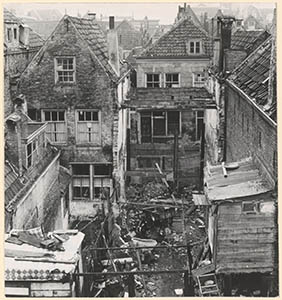
Pictured is the back of the Kromme Elleboog number 40. The street was one of the oldest streets in Dordrecht, but in the 20th century it was also a street with the poorest inhabitants. Slumlords tried to make as much money as possible without maintaining the properties. All kinds of extensions had to make even more rental space possible. This photo is from 1960. A few years later, these houses were demolished.

A slumlord (or slum landlord) is a slang term for a landlord, generally an absentee landlord with more than one property, who attempts to maximize profit by minimizing spending on property maintenance, and usually rents to tenants that they can intimidate. Severe housing shortages allow slumlords to charge higher rents and, when they can get away with it, to break rental laws.

A "retail slumlord" is one who keeps a shopping mall in a bad shape and may not pay taxes until the government buys or confiscates it.

The origin of the term "slumlord" is unknown, but an early mention can be found in the 1927 journal article "Theories, Facts, and Figures" by William L. Hare in the academic journal Garden Cities & Town Planning: A Journal of Housing, Town Planning & Civic Improvement. Hare credits the 'polemical press' of the time for referring to landlords of areas referred to as slums as slumlords.

== Operation ==
Traditionally, real estate is seen as a long-term investment to most buyers. Especially in the developed world, most landlords will properly maintain their properties even when doing so proves costly in the short term, in order to attract higher rents and more desirable tenants in the long run. A well-maintained property is worth more to potential buyers.

In contrast, slumlords usually do not contract with property management services, do very little or no maintenance on their property, sometimes just enough to meet minimum local requirements for habitability. In some circumstances, such as in Cleveland during the first years of the Great Migration, landlords increased rents for African Americans in order to exploit the difficulties they had getting accommodation. Subsequently, this caused the Cleveland Chamber of Commerce to conduct a survey which concluded that black tenants paid 65% more for equivalent housing than white tenants.

Also, slumlords are often willing to rent to less-desirable tenants that are not able to pass background checks, such as persons on a sex offender registry. As such they typically do not enter into long-term lease agreements, doing only the minimum term required by law (e.g. month-to-month), and as such prosecute many evictions. It is also frequent for the slumlord to receive rent in cash to avoid disclosing it for tax purposes. Thus, in the United States, slumlords would normally not participate in government-subsidized programs such as Section 8, due to the requirements both to report all income received and to keep properties well-maintained.

A slumlord may also hope that his property will eventually be purchased by a government for more money than it is worth as a part of urban renewal, or by investors as the neighborhood in which it is situated undergoes gentrification. In Johannesburg, regions suffering from urban decay frequently have landlords whom the government believes exploit their tenants, making them stay in buildings that fail to meet fire codes. In Britain, local councils deal with private landlords; without adequate scrutiny this can result in landlords being able to fill properties below rental code with subsidized tenants.

Some slumlords are more interested in profit they have acquired through property "flipping," a form of speculation, than they are in acquiring any profit through rental income. Slumlords with this "business model" may not maintain their properties at all or pay municipal property taxes and fines they tend to accrue in great quantities. Knowing it will take years for a municipality to condemn and seize, or possibly tear down, a property, the slumlord may count on selling it before this happens. Such slumlords may not even bother to keep up with their mortgage payments if they become equity-rich but cash-poor or if they feel that they can sell the property before it goes into foreclosure and is taken by their lender, typically a six- to eight-month process at the quickest.

One example of a slumlord is Peter Rachman, a landlord who operated in Notting Hill, London, in the 1950s and until his 1962 death. He became notorious for exploitation of his tenants, with the word "Rachmanism" entering the Oxford English Dictionary. His henchmen included Michael de Freitas (aka Michael X/Abdul Malik), who created a reputation as a black-power leader, and Johnny Edgecombe, who became a promoter of jazz and blues, which helped to keep him in the limelight.

=== Black market renting ===
In locations with rent control and where there is legal protection of tenants, some landlords may rent out properties illegally. For instance, in the United Kingdom, there has arisen a practice of illegal subletting of social housing homes where the tenant illegally rents out the home at a higher rent. In Sweden, rental contracts with regulated rent can be bought on the black market, either from the current tenant or sometimes directly from the property owner. Specialised black-market dealers assist the property owners with such transactions.

== Informal renting ==
Informal renting takes place in countries such as the United States, Brazil, Nigeria, India, England, and the Baltic countries. Usually, informal renting consists of not giving any proof of payment, meaning the slumlord is able to change the price day by day and intimidate tenants out of seeking help from local authorities.

== Reactions ==
People who have negative opinions of slumlords hold them primarily responsible for causing declining local property values and for the eventual creation of whole neighborhoods of shanty buildings. Some of these people say that slumlords leech away the "wealth" of the poor with little regard either to the future generations or the welfare of their current tenants. In effect, they thus consider slumlording a force running exactly counter to gentrification. Whereas gentrification describes the result of a plurality of local landlords making decisive improvements to rental properties which add value to their rental units, justify hiking rent rates, eliminate less-affluent tenants and generally raise neighborhood property values, slumlording naturally results in a gradual general decay in living conditions, public safety, neighborhood prestige, and, ultimately, property values.

== See also ==
- Landlord harassment
- Rentier capitalism
