= Vehicle registration plates of Bosnia and Herzegovina =

Bosnia and Herzegovina
- Current Bosnia and Herzegovina vehicle registration plate (issued from 28 September 2009).
- Country: Bosnia and Herzegovina
- Country code: BIH

Current series
- Size: 520 mm × 110 mm 20.5 in × 4.3 in
- Serial format: A12-B-345
- Colour (front): Black on white
- Colour (rear): Black on white

Old Bosnia and Herzegovina vehicle registration plate (Issued until September 28, 2009, but still in use)

Current Bosnia and Herzegovina Taxi vehicle registration plate

Bosnia and Herzegovina vehicle registration plates have held their current form since 2 February 1998. Currently the Bosnia and Herzegovina (BiH) vehicle registration plate format consists of seven characters: five numbers and two letters arranged in the following order: X00-X-000 (taxis: TA-000000). The plates are uniform across the country and do not denote the place (town, municipality, canton, or entity) where the vehicle is registered, as was the case prior to 1998. Likewise the plates do not contain any heraldic symbols. The plates use only letters which are represented equally in Latin and Cyrillic script (A, E, O, J, K, M, T).

== Special plates ==
Current Bosnia and Herzegovina temporary registration plate (TT - Testne Tablice)

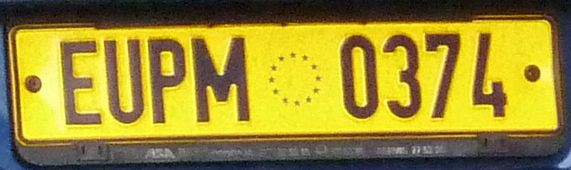
Bosnia and Herzegovina EUPM plates (EUPM - European Union Police Mission)

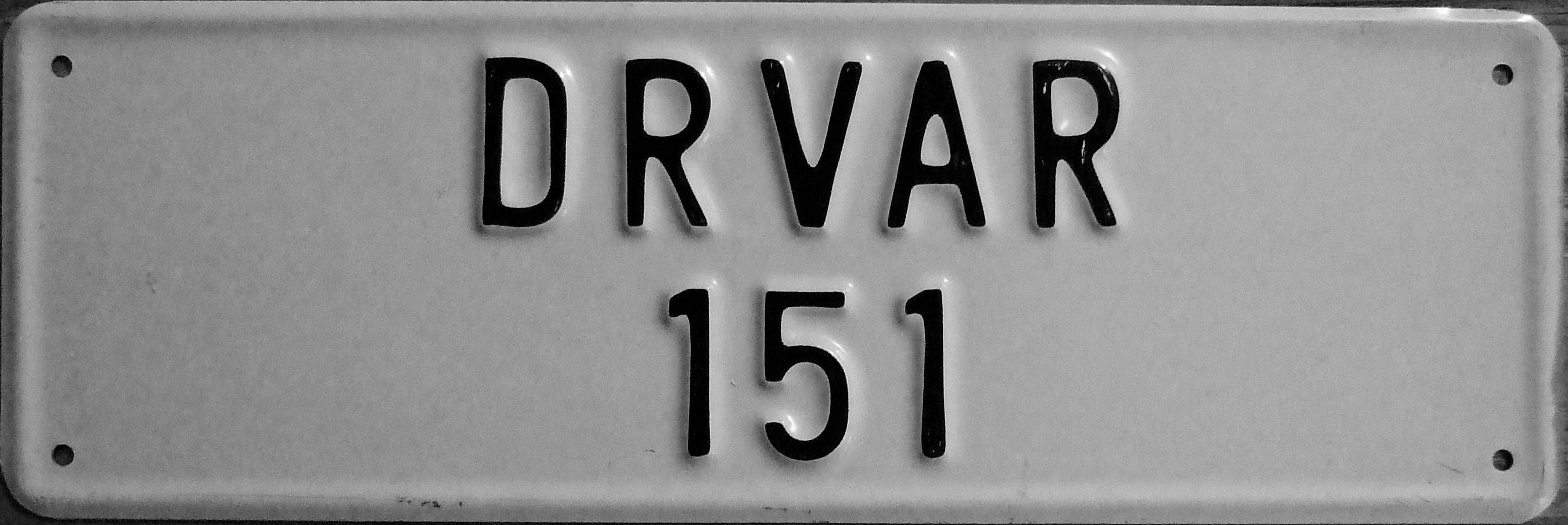
Former Bosnia and Herzegovina working road machine plate from Drvar

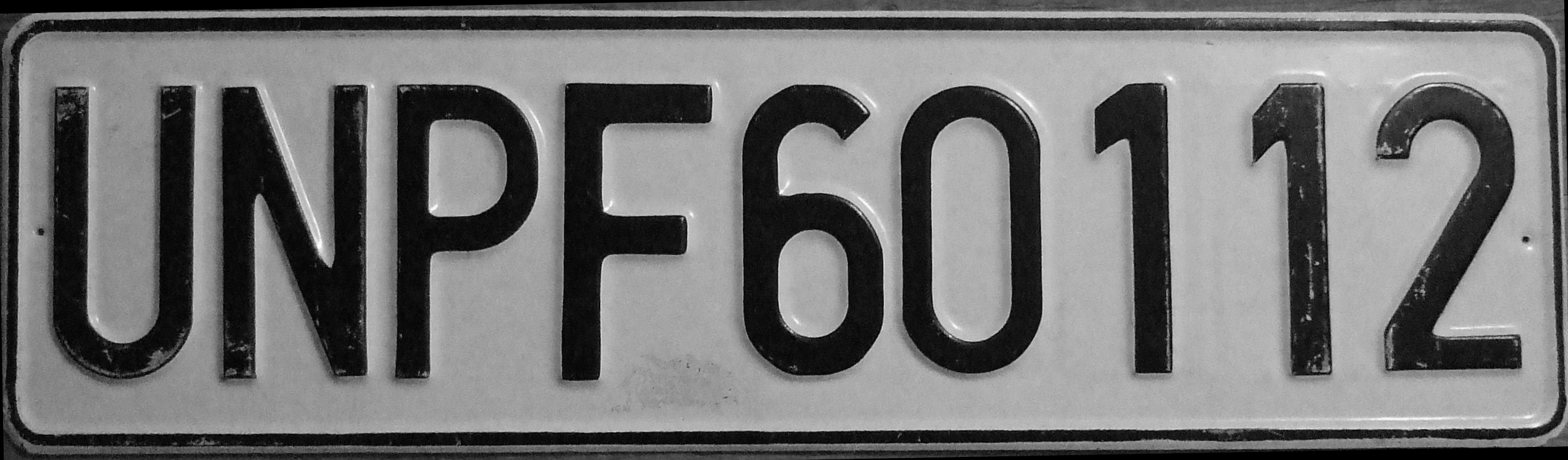
UNPF plate (United Nations Protection Forces)

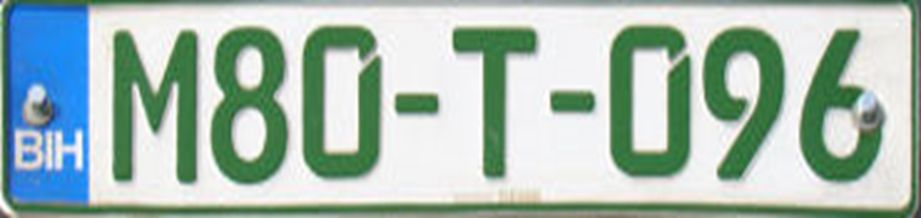
Current Bosnia and Herzegovina agricultural registration plate

- Working road machine plates had the regional letters at the top, followed by numbers. These plates were black-on-white.
- Temporary plates have the letters "TT" (standing for Testne Tablice) followed by 6 numbers (e.g. TT-000000). The letters are colored red.
- Military plates had a Euro strip, like from previous series (XX-nnnnLL), but without a blue background. These plates consisted of 5 numbers and then one letter (e.g. 00000-X).
- Since 2024, the portable plates are issued, which have the letters "MT", followed by 6 numbers (e.g. MT-000000). The letters are colored red.
- Since 2025, the oldtimer plates are issued, which have the letters "OT", followed by 6 numbers (e.g. OT-000000).
- Diplomatic plates had a blue background and yellow font. Unlike previous series, the first group of numbers contained only two digits, and the only letters that could be used were A, C, M and E (e.g. 00-A-000).
- EUPM plates used a yellow background and the prefix "EUPM" followed by numbers.
- Export plates had blue-on-white plates and used the civilian format.
- Foreign-owned plates were white-on-blue with a blue font.
- UNHCR plates used a blue font and had the prefix "UNHCR" followed by numbers.
- Agricultural vehicles were white-on-green and had regional letters at the top, followed by numbers.
- UNSF plates were black-on-blue and had the prefix "SFOR".
- NATO plates were black-on-light-green and had the prefix "NATO" (with the NATO emblem as the divider).
- UN Trailers had the style of "UN 1234T".

== History ==
The revised registration plates were introduced as an initiative of the International High Representative for Bosnia and Herzegovina, Carlos Westendorp. In a report from the Office of the High Representative for Bosnia and Herzegovina prior to the decision, it had been noted that police conduct around the Inter-Entity Boundary Line separating the two entities of Bosnia and Herzegovina, the Federation of Bosnia and Herzegovina and Republika Srpska, had been the "greatest obstacle to freedom of movement", including intimidation and arbitrary fines.

Elsewhere it has been noted that vehicles which bore licence plates from one entity would be subject to vandalism in the other entity. The development of licence plates which would not serve as proxy identifiers of driver ethnicity was a partial solution to these problems.

=== City codes ===
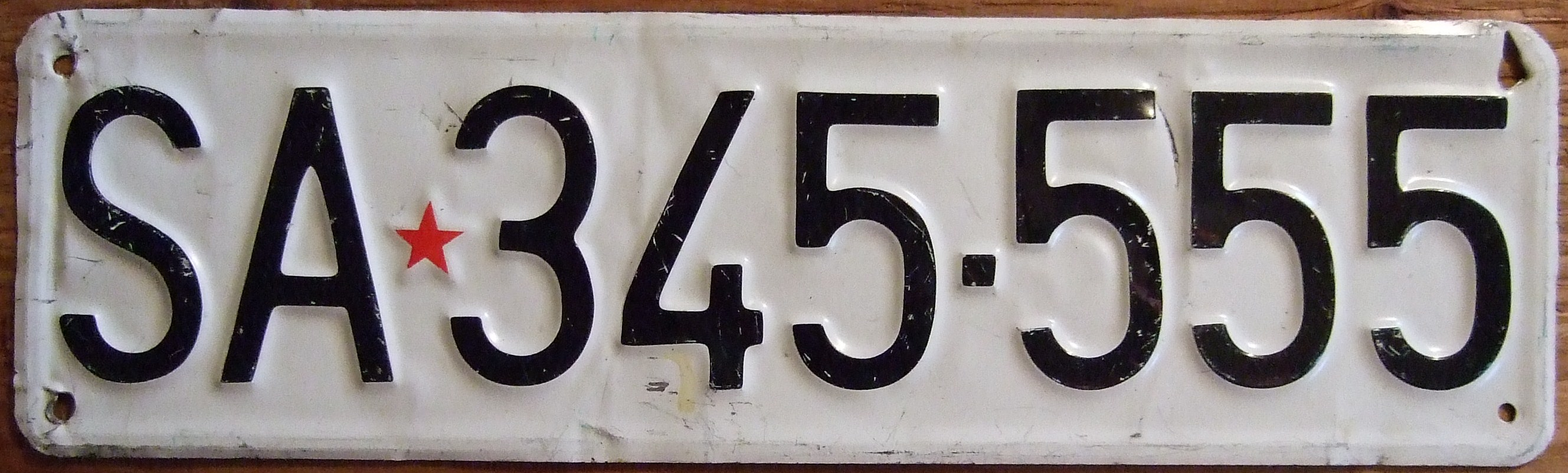
Yugoslav plate from Sarajevo

==== Prior to 1992 ====
Code	Region	Code	Region	Code	Region
BL	Banja Luka	TD	Titov Drvar	LI	Livno
PD	Prijedor	TR	Travnik	TB	Trebinje
SA	Sarajevo	ZE	Zenica	ČP	Čapljina
TZ	Tuzla	BI	Bihać	KNJ	Konjic
MO	Mostar	DO	Doboj	GŽ	Goražde
BČ	Brčko	VI	Visoko	ZV	Zvornik
BN	Bijeljina	JC	Jajce	MD	Modriča
BU	Bugojno				

==== Republic of Bosnia and Herzegovina ====
Plate from Tuzla (1994–1998)

On the territory controlled by Army of the Republic of Bosnia and Herzegovina from 1992 were used new license plates. They wore a blue strip on the left side with the "BIH" script and the coat of arms above the script (1992 is no blue strip). On the white background the form was XX-nnnnLL or XX-nnnnnL, where "XX" was the code of the city, "nnnn"/"nnnnn" were digits, and "LL" two letters (previously one letter), where the first letter denoted the municipality where it was issued (before this is not at all). Towns are given in following table:

Code	Region	Code	Region
SA	Sarajevo	BI	Bihać
PD	Prijedor	DO	Doboj
TZ	Tuzla	VI	Visoko
MO	Mostar	JC	Jajce
BR	Brčko	BU	Bugojno
TR	Travnik	ZV	Zvornik
ZE	Zenica	MD	Modriča
KO	Konjic	GO	Goražde
BL	Banja Luka	TD	Titov Drvar

==== Republika Srpska ====
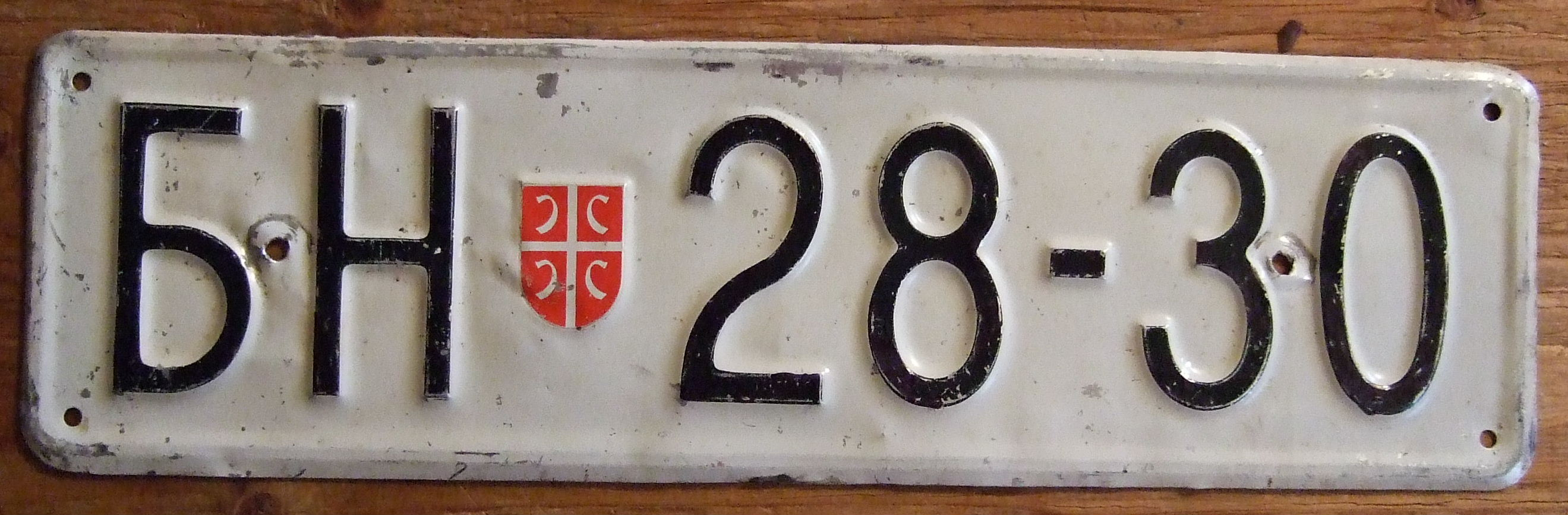
Plate from Bijeljina

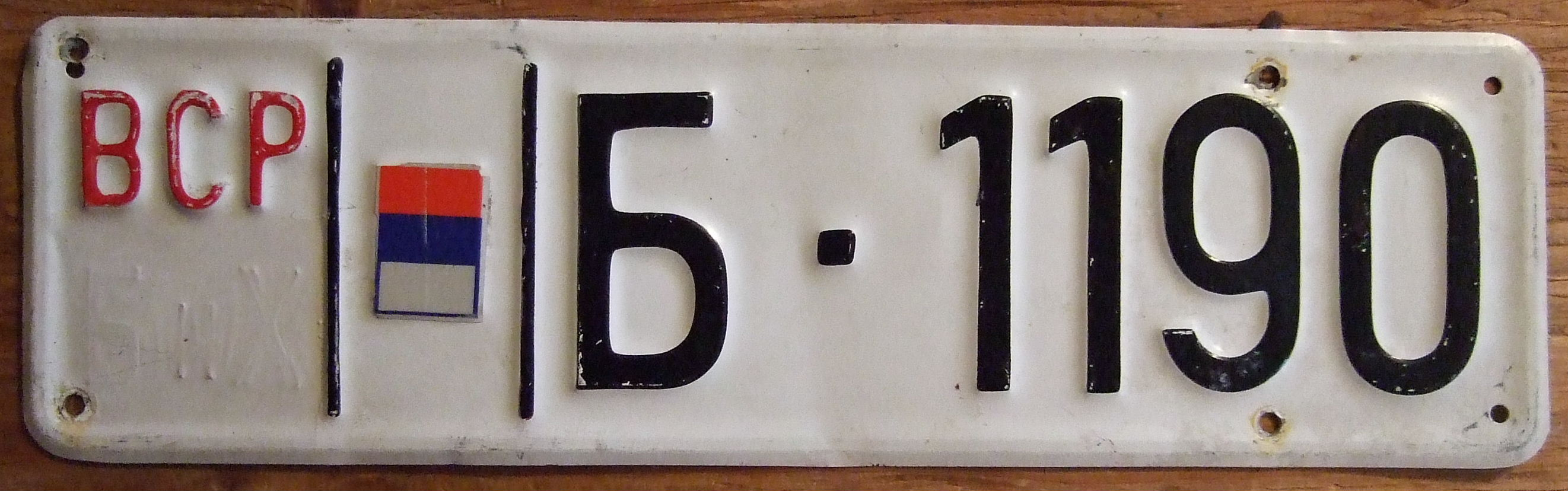
Military plate

On territory of the Republika Srpska entity, license plates were used similar to those before the war, with difference that instead of red star, the Serb four-S coat of arms was used. Letters on plates were usually in Cyrillic script, but the license plates with Latin versions of codes are also used.

Code	Region	Code	Region
СС	Sarajevo (Srpsko Sarajevo, Српско Сарајево)	СЊ	Foča (renamed to Srbinje (Србиње))
ПД	Prijedor (Приједор)	ДО	Doboj (Добој)
БЛ	Banja Luka (Бања Лука)	ЗВ	Zvornik (Зворник)
БЧ	Brčko (Брчко)	МД	Modriča (Модрича)
ТБ	Trebinje (Требиње)	БН	Bijeljina (Бијељина)
МГ	Mrkonjić Grad (Мркоњић Град)	ВГ	Višegrad (Вишеград)
ДВ	Drvar (Дрвар)	НЊ	Nevesinje (Невесиње)

==== Croatian Republic of Herzeg-Bosnia ====
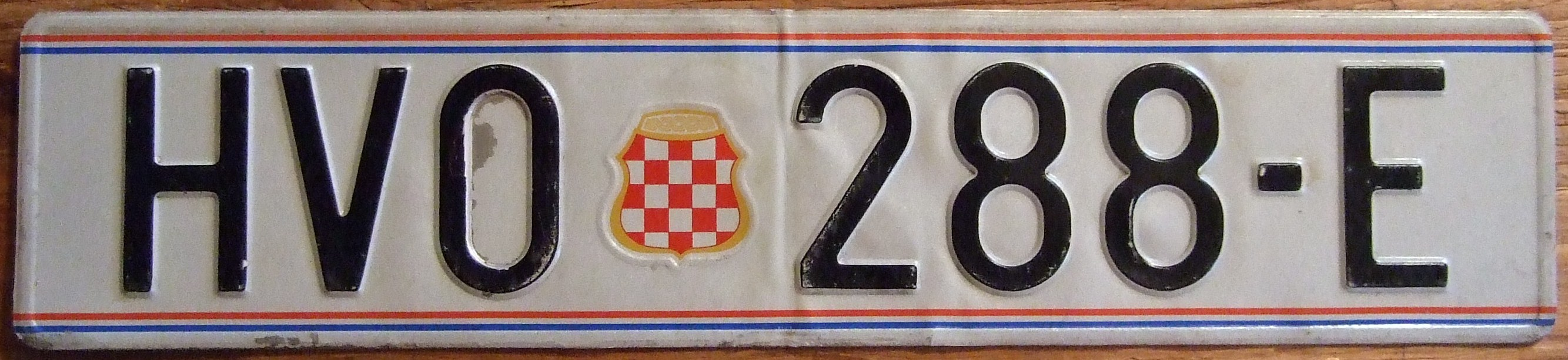
HVO plate (Hrvatsko vijeće obrane)

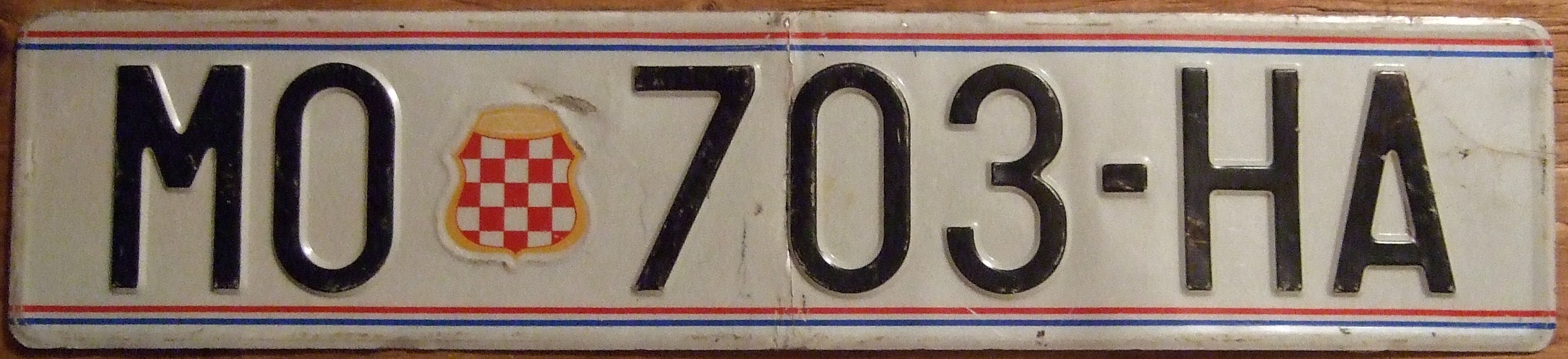
Plate from Mostar

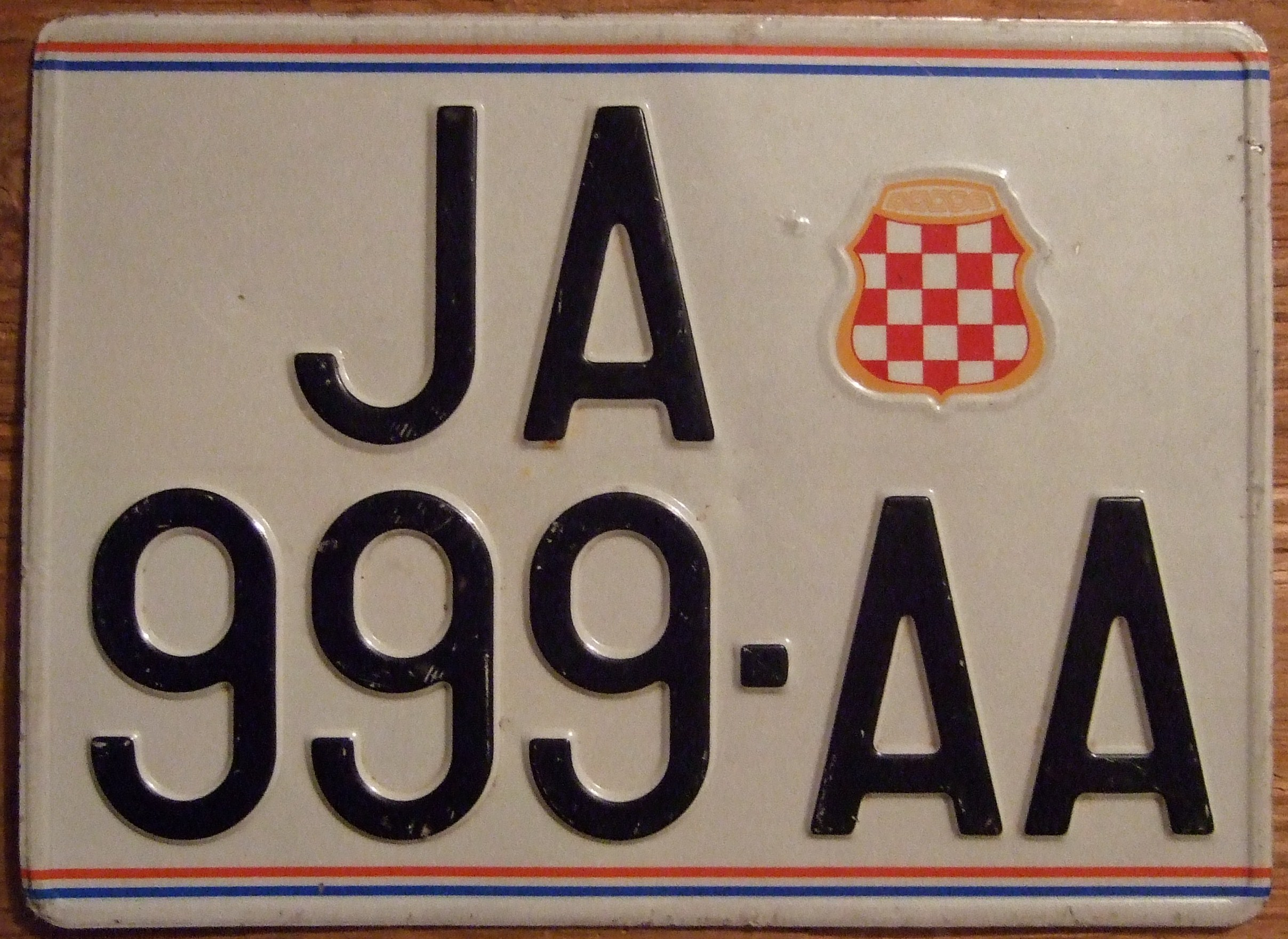
Plate from Jajce

On the territory of the Croatian Republic of Herzeg-Bosnia, license plates were used similar to those of Croatia, with difference in the shape of shield in Croat coat of arms ("checkerboard"-"šahovnica").

Code	Region	Code	Region
MO	Mostar	TR	Travnik
ČA	Čapljina	OR	Orašje
PO	Posušje	KI	Kiseljak
ŠB	Široki Brijeg	RA	Rama
JA	Jajce	ŽE	Žepče
TG	Tomislavgrad	LI	Livno
GR	Grude	LJ	Ljubuški
BU	Bugojno	DR	Drvar
ČT	Čitluk	KO	Konjic

== Diplomatic, consular and foreign mission plate prefixes ==
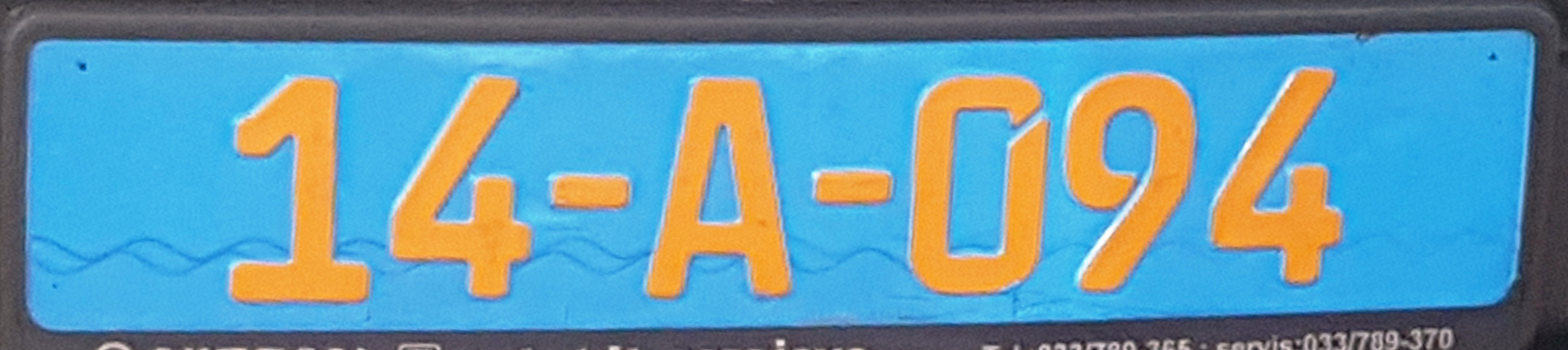
Current Bosnia and Herzegovina diplomatic plate

These prefixes were also valid for Croatia from 1991 to 1994.

Code	Country or Organization
10	France
11	United States
12	Iran
13	Croatia
14	Turkey
15	Germany
16	Austria
17	Saudi Arabia
18	Italy
19	Kuwait
20	United Kingdom
21	Sudan
22	Qatar
23	Netherlands
24	Libya
25	Switzerland
26	Egypt
27	Ireland
28	Slovenia
29	Organization for Security and Cooperation in Europe
30	Canada
32	Sweden
33	Russia
34	Czech Republic
35	United Nations
36	Pakistan
37	Office of the High Representative
38	Commission on Human Rights
39	Norway
40	Bulgaria
41	International Bank for Reconstruction and Development
42	Portugal
43	Malaysia
44	United Nations High Commissioner for Refugees
45	UAE
46	International Monetary Fund
47	Customs and Fiscal Assistant Office
48	Denmark
49	European Central Bank
50	European Commission in Bosnia and Herzegovina
51	United Nations Development Program
52	International Organization for Migration
53	Belgium
54	Central Bank
55	Commission for Property of Displaced Persons and Refugees
56	Japan
57	United Nations Educational, Scientific and Cultural Organization
58	North Macedonia
59	Hungary
60	United Nations Children's Fund
61	Spain
62	Palestine
63	Greece
64	European Union Monitoring Mission in the former Yugoslavia
65	International Monetary Group
66	China
68	World Health Organization
69	Romania
70	International Centre for Migration Policy Development
71	International Commission on Missing Persons
72	SMOM
73	International Committee of the Red Cross
74	Poland
75	Council of Europe
76	International Trust Fund
77	International Federation of Red Cross and Red Crescent Society
78	International Finance Corporation
79	Vatican City
80	Serbia
81	Office of the High Commissioner for Human Rights
82	Guinea-Bissau
83	Refugees Return Foundation
84	European Union Police Mission (A prefix), European Union Monitoring Mission (M prefix)
85	Regional Environmental Centre
86	Stability Pact Anti-corruption Initiative
87	Slovakia
88	The Registry
89	High Judicial and Prosecutorial Council
90	Office of the EU Special Representative
91	Japan International Cooperation Agency
92	Montenegro
93	Australia
94	Qatar
95	Ukraine
96	Regional Cooperation Council
97	Peace Support Operation Training Centre
0100	Malaysia
0102	Azerbaijan
0103	Brazil
0119	Algeria
