= Edwards v. Habib =

1968 U.S. Court of Appeals case on eviction

- Court: United States Court of Appeals for the District of Columbia Circuit
- Full case name: Yvonne C. Edwards v. Nathan Habib
- Argued: January 22, 1968
- Decided: May 17, 1968
- Citation: 397 F.2d 687

Case history
- Subsequent history: Petition for rehearing en banc denied, July 11, 1968

Court membership
- Judges sitting: John A. Danaher, James Skelly Wright, Carl E. McGowan

Case opinions
- Majority: Wright, joined by McGowan (Part III only)
- Concurrence: McGowan
- Dissent: Danaher

In United States landlord-tenant law, Edwards v. Habib, 397 F.2d 687 (D.C. Cir. 1968), was a case decided by the D.C. Circuit that includes the first recognition of retaliatory eviction as a defense to eviction.

== Factual background ==
Plaintiff Edwards rented property from defendant Habib on a month-to-month basis. Habib failed to address sanitary code violations brought up by Edwards, so Edwards reported Habib to the Department of Licenses and the Inspection Department. An inspection revealed 40 sanitary code violations, and Habib was ordered to rectify the violations. After the inspection, Habib obtained a default judgment against Edwards in a statutory eviction action.

== Holding ==
The court held that a tenant cannot be evicted for reporting sanitary code violations, and this became known as the defense of retaliatory eviction.
