= Unlawful eviction and harassment =

Criminal offence in the UK

Unlawful eviction and harassment is a criminal offence in the United Kingdom under the Protection from Eviction Act 1977. It is the crime of a landlord or agent unlawfully evicting or harassing his or her tenant.

Unlawful eviction is the deprivation of occupation of a residential occupier of any premises of his occupation or any part of it or attempts to do so :s1(2) of 1977 Act. Actions such as changing the locks R v Yuthiwattana (1984) 16 HLR 49, CA or locking a lavatory door R v Burke (1991) 22 HLR 433, HL all constitute unlawful eviction.

Conduct that could amount to harassment under the Act includes; interfering with the peace and comfort of a residential occupier or members of his household or persistently withdrawing or withholding services that are needed for the occupation of the premises used as residence: section 1(3A).
