= Revenge eviction =

Renters who report issues with their property to their landlord or to housing health and safety regulators risk a type of eviction. While landlords are often legally required to conduct certain repairs or ensure properties to-let are within health and safety codes, a landlord might choose to evict their renters instead of addressing the issue.

In England and Wales, revenge eviction had been legal via the use of a Section 21 notice so-called "no-fault eviction" until 2026.

In the United States, retaliatory eviction as it's known is illegal, and since Edwards v. Habib (1968) has been as a legal defence for renters unjustly removed from their homes.

== Revenge eviction in the United Kingdom ==
Within the United Kingdom, Revenge eviction is a term used to describe an eviction process initiated by a landlord where a tenant asks for repairs to be carried out or complains about conditions. Campaign groups such as Shelter have called for revenge evictions to be legislated against.

=== England and Wales ===
In England and Wales, an assured shorthold tenancy was the default legal category for residential tenancies. This allowed a section 21 notice eviction, which did not require the landlord to have any reason for evicting tenants after a fixed-term tenancy ends or during a tenancy with no fixed end date. This allowed landlords to evict or threaten tenants that complain without needing to give an explanation. The Deregulation Act 2015 introduced some curbs on when a section 21 notice of possession may be served upon a tenant following a complaint of disrepair. However, data released by a Freedom of Information request by Generation Rent, suggests that very few tenants were protected from revenge evictions after making complaints about their housing quality.

A 2015 Citizens Advice study on section 21 evictions found that tenants evicted using this process were twice as likely to have complained to their landlord, and six times as likely to have complained about their landlord to a local authority.

Section 21 evictions were abolished by the Renters' Rights Act 2025, which came into effect on 1 May 2026.

== Retaliatory eviction in the United States ==
In American landlord–tenant law, a retaliatory eviction often refers to the substantive legal defense and affirmative cause of action that can be used by a tenant against a landlord if the tenant was evicted for reporting poor housing conditions, such as sanitary violations or violations of minimum housing standards.

Retaliatory eviction first appeared as a tenant's defense against eviction in Edwards v. Habib (1968), where a tenant was evicted after reporting sanitary code violations. The D.C. Circuit recognized that the eviction was unjustified because it was in retaliation for the reporting of violations.

=== As a legal defense ===
The retaliatory eviction legal defense eviction was first recognized in the D.C. Circuit case Edwards v. Habib.

==== West Virginia ====
In the case Imperial Colliery Co. v. Fout, the West Virginia Supreme Court reaffirmed that retaliatory eviction was a valid defense against eviction, but added the condition that the retaliation must be against a tenant's exercise of a right incidental to their tenancy. Therefore, a defense of retaliatory eviction did not exist for a tenant evicted after participating in a labor strike.

=== As a cause of action ===
Retaliatory eviction was first recognized as a cause of action in the California case Aweeka v. Bonds. The case recognized the inequity of forcing the tenant to wait until they were confronted with an unlawful detainer action to bring up retaliatory eviction as a defense.

== See also ==
- Housing crisis
- Housing insecurity
