= The Registry =

In housing, The Registry is a risk management tool used by landlords as a screening mechanism for prospective renters. The term is most commonly used as a form of synecdoche to refer to a handful of the most common registry systems in the United States, "The New American Registry", "The First American Registry", "The Registry Saferent", and "The U.D. Registry".

== Mechanism ==
Each registry automatically receives a notification from various metropolitan housing courts whenever any tenant is sued by a landlord. In areas without housing courts, lists of named defendants in unlawful detainer (eviction) suits will be compiled from court records. Usually there is a period of time before those records become public, and if the suit is resolved before that, the names will not be listed. Even if the tenant successfully defends themselves, they are kept in the registries. In addition, there are procedures by which landlords can report tenants who skip or are habitually late paying rent. Almost all landlords subscribe to these major registry services and screen potential applicants; many landlords will reject tenants on the basis of their presence in the registry.

== Criticism ==
- Several class actions have been brought against individual registries in the names of tenants who have won their cases in housing court but remain blacklisted. Most of these cases are settled out of court.
- In addition to the registries, many complain of the various housing courts' complicit involvement, by providing the names of the defendants through an automated service. This is an often unspoken source of revenue for these departments, as they generally charge $0.05 per listing.
