= Landlord–tenant law =

Law that details rights and duties of landlords and tenants

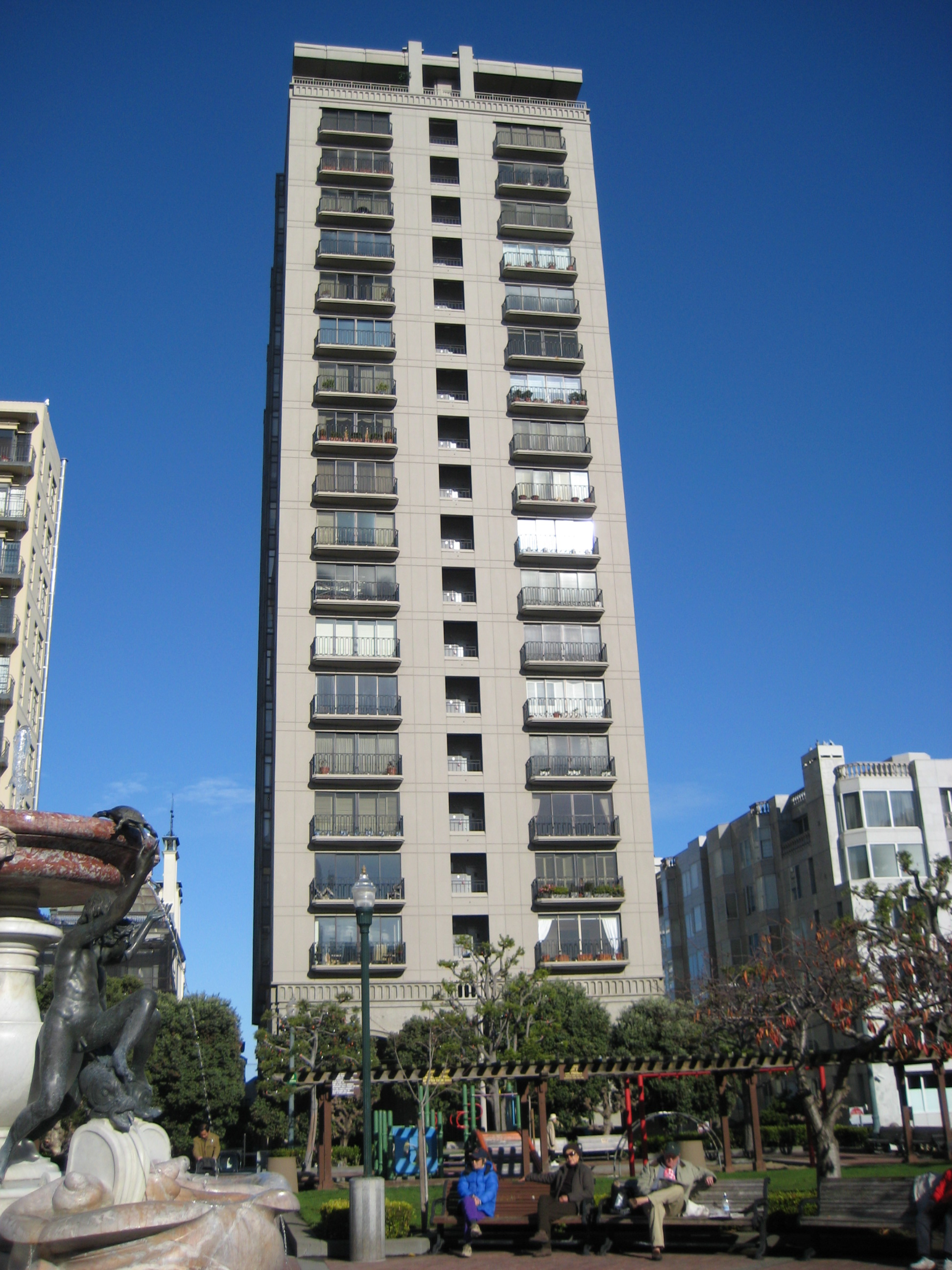
Landlord–tenant law governs the rights and responsibilities of leasehold estates, like in an apartment complex.

Landlord–tenant law is the field of law that deals with the rights and duties of landlords and tenants.

In common law legal systems such as Irish law, landlord–tenant law includes elements of the common law of real property and contract. In modern times, however, it is frequently governed by statute. Generally, leases must include a few certain provisions to be valid.

A residential lease must include the parties, the premises (the address or relevant space), and the term of the lease. The lease term can be indefinite but must be stipulated as such in the document. Typically, leases will also include the price of rent per month or per term, but this is not legally required.

A commercial lease must include details about which fixtures are included. It also must outline the cost of rent leases (unlike residential leases), which often comes with a contingent percentage of gross sales, revenue, etc.

In civil law traditions such as German law, the landlord–tenant relationship is governed entirely by statute, derived historically from Roman law and the ius commune.

== History ==
The landlord-tenant relationship is defined by existence of a leasehold estate. Traditionally, the only obligation of the landlord in the United States was to grant the estate to the tenant, although in England and Wales, it has been clear since 1829 that a Landlord must put a tenant into possession. Modern landlord-tenant law includes a number of other rights and duties held by both landlords and tenants.

The modern interpretation of the tenant-landlord relationship has hinged on the view that leases include many elements of contract law in addition to a simple conveyancing. In American landlord-tenant law, many of these rights and duties have been codified in the Uniform Residential Landlord and Tenant Act.

== Residential and commercial leases ==
Landlord–tenant law generally recognizes differences between residential and commercial leases on the assumption that residential leases present much more of a risk of unequal bargaining power than commercial leases.

Residential leases are contracts that are designed for individuals or groups to live, or reside, in the leased space. Most governmental entities have "recognized the sanctity of the home." Therefore, lessees of residential spaces are generally afforded more rights and protections than commercial leases. It is also because of the presumption of unequal bargaining power that residential spaces are afforded more protections. States, counties, and cities have different laws, and likewise, varying levels of protections for the tenants and landlords of commercial spaces.

Commercial leases are leases for spaces that are for business uses, such as industrial, office, retail, and manufacturing. Commercial leases generally have fewer consumer protections than residential leases because they are subject to much more negotiation.

== Landlord duties ==
The modern concept of landlord-tenant law includes duties beyond simple conveyancing of the lease. These duties legally cannot be waived in a lease with the exception of the duty to deliver possession. Clauses that waive these duties are void for reasons of public policy:

=== Duty to deliver possession ===
In England and according to the Uniform Residential Landlord and Tenant Act in India, the landlord has a duty to deliver actual possession to the tenant at the beginning of a lease. The justification for placing this burden on the landlord is the idea that the landlord has more resources than the new tenants to pursue legal remedies against wrongful holdovers (former tenants that will not give up possession of the lease).

=== Covenant of quiet enjoyment ===
By virtue of the contractual aspects of a lease, modern leases in America include an implied covenant of quiet enjoyment. This means that the landlord will not interfere with the tenant's possessory rights to the lease. Though a landlord may forcibly enter without required notice during an emergency, generally a mere necessity for quick action does not constitute an emergency within the doctrine of imminent peril, where the situation calling for the action is one which should reasonably have been anticipated and which the person whose action is called for should have been prepared to meet; the doctrine of imminent peril does not excuse one who has brought about the peril by his own negligence.

=== Implied warranty of habitability ===
A landlord must provide shelter free of serious defects which might harm health or safety. In some states, the tenant has the right to cancel the lease and move out if the defects are severe enough and the landlord has not made repairs in a reasonable amount of time. Tenants who want to cancel their leases should seek the counsel of an attorney or a governmental agency devoted to landlord tenant issues to ensure that the conditions are severe enough to cancel the lease.

This warranty does not apply to commercial leaseholds, only residential.

=== Duty to provide essential services ===
In at least one state, the state of Oklahoma, a landlord is required by state law to provide for reasonable amounts of running water, hot water, electricity, gas, or other essential services. Failure of which, may result in, among other remedies, deduction of the price paid by the tenant for said services from the rent. Other States may have similar provisions of law.

== Tenant remedies ==
Landlord–tenant law also includes protections for tenants:

=== Constructive eviction ===
In an action for unpaid rent brought by a landlord against a tenant, a tenant can offer constructive eviction as an affirmative defense. A constructive eviction means that the tenant is no longer able to occupy the lease, but that the tenant was not physically evicted by the landlord. This is often used in conjunction with a breach of the implied covenant of habitability.

=== Breach of covenant ===
Leases include dependent covenants - if the landlord fails to perform their duties, the tenant will be relieved of paying rent. The breach of these covenants can be used as an affirmative defense by the tenant in an action for unpaid rent or eviction. These covenants include the warrant of habitability (keeping the premises habitable) and the covenant to repair (requiring the landlord to repair damage to the premises). In American law, the warrant of habitability was established by the D.C. Circuit case Javins v. First National Realty Corp.

=== Retaliatory eviction ===
A landlord cannot evict a tenant in retaliation for reporting health and safety code violations. A tenant can use retaliatory eviction as both an affirmative defense against an eviction and as a cause of action against a landlord. The defense of retaliatory eviction was first recognized in the D.C. Circuit case Edwards v. Habib.

In California, retaliatory eviction is considered an affirmative defense and can be used to defend a case. The California code 1942.5 defines the legal aspects of its use and further goes on to prohibit Retaliatory eviction, for no less than 180 days, after a series of triggering events. Some form of protection for tenants against retaliatory eviction is available in 42 State statutes and the District of Columbia laws. The only eight states without this protection are Georgia, Idaho, Indiana, Louisiana, Missouri, North Dakota, Oklahoma, and Wyoming. However, in the state of Oklahoma, it is a misdemeanor criminal offense to willfully disturb, interfere, or obstruct state business, such as the official business of code enforcement, and thus retaliatory eviction may violate various applicable state criminal laws.

=== Money damages ===
Some states, such as Wisconsin, allow for the tenant to recover money damages if the landlord breaks the state statutes or administrative codes. The tenant has the duty to prove that the landlord owes money to the tenant for damages. If the tenant can prove that an Agriculture, Trade, and Consumer Protection Code rule was violated, they are entitled to double the damages under Wisconsin Law.

== Tenant duties ==
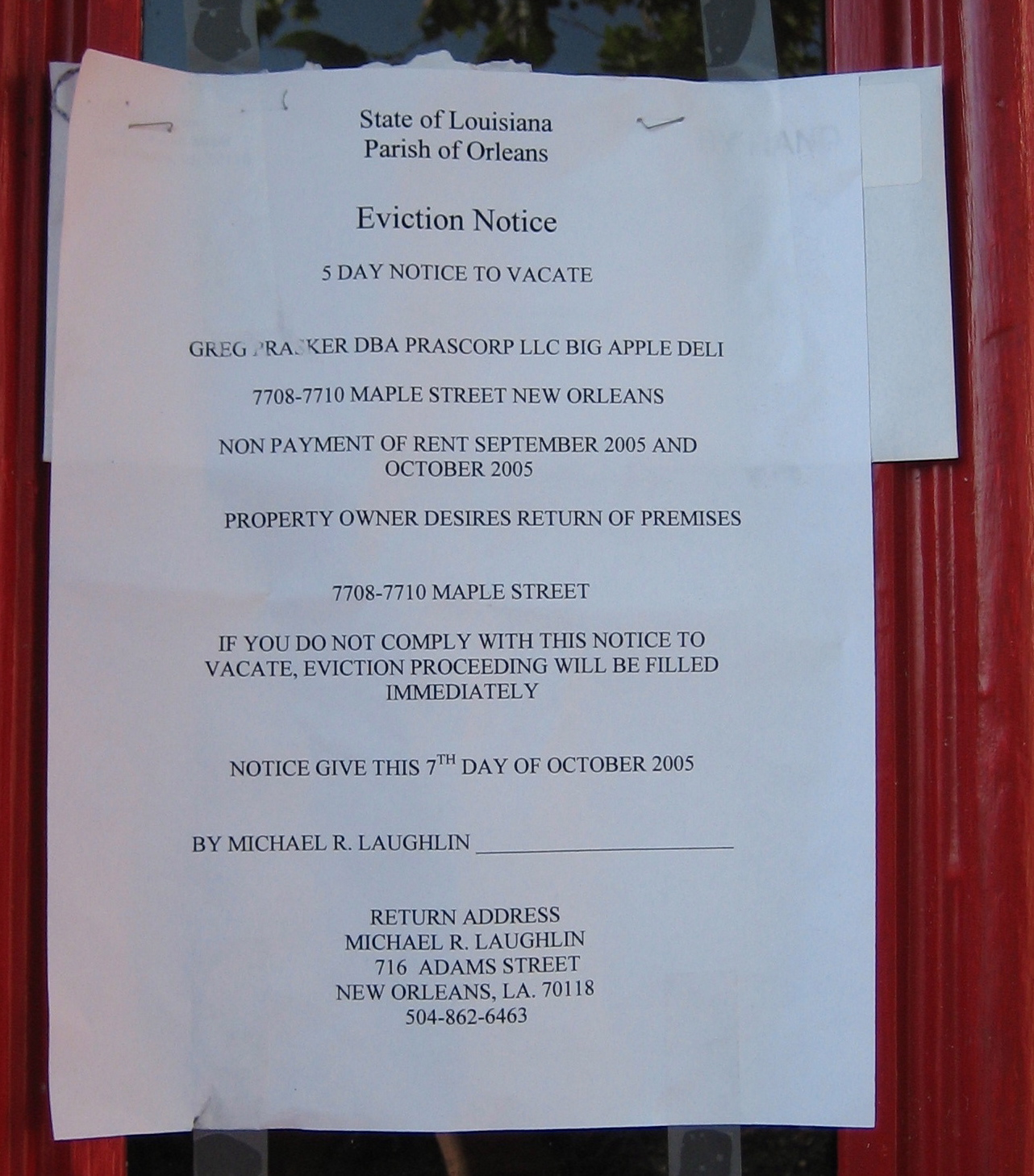
An eviction notice for failure to pay rent. The fact that the city of New Orleans was under a mandatory order and no mail had been delivered since two months before was not taken into consideration.

Tenants also have duties attached to their possessory interests:

=== Duty to preserve the premises ===
Leases usually include a limited covenant to repair for the tenants, and this essentially equates to refraining from committing waste. When tenants move from the premises, if they want to get their security deposit returned to them, most statutes require the premises to be returned to the landlord in the same condition that it was in when they moved in, minus normal wear and tear.

=== Duty to operate ===
In commercial leases, a duty to operate may be written into the lease. This means that a commercial tenant cannot leave a rented property vacant without operating the business for which the lease was made. A duty to operate does not exist unless written into the lease or obviously in line with the intent of the lease.

=== Duty to pay rent ===
A tenant's duty to pay rent was traditionally thought of as an independent covenant, meaning that the tenant was required to pay rent regardless of whether the landlord fulfilled their duties of performance. Now the duty of a tenant to pay rent is considered to be a dependent covenant, and the tenant can be freed from the duty to pay rent if the landlord breaches the covenant of repair or warranty of habitability.

== Sublease and Assignment ==
Leaseholds are typically freely alienable, as a general rule. This is waivable by either party, and often is by landlord with boiler plate lease documents. Sublease and assignment are often used interchangeably but are different concepts. Assignment is the transfer of the right of possession for the rest of the original tenant's term to the assignee. A sublease refers only to a transfer of possession for less than the original tenant's term. The difference is the question of what individual's possession abuts the landlord's reversion.

It's important to note that short term rentals, such as Air Bnb and Vrbo are not subleases or assignments, but rather they grant a license for people to take possession. This means that short term rental guests do not enjoy the same rights as tenants, but rather are treated more as guests.

== Landlord remedies ==
Landlords also have a variety of available remedies to reclaim possession or claim unpaid rent:

=== Forfeiture ===
Before statutory eviction processes, landlords could use the common law remedy of forfeiture to reclaim possession of a lease. Forfeiture was generally achieved by adding a condition subsequent to the terms of the lease.

=== Self-help ===
Landlord self-help remedies are evictions where "the landlord takes active steps to remove the tenant from the property without initiating legal action." Self-help remedies have been limited by forcible entry and detainer (FED) statutes. Most states have prohibited self-help eviction.

=== Monetary damages ===
Landlords can also recover monetary damages for unpaid rent, and the methods of obtaining the rent and the amount that can be obtained are dictated by state statutes. The majority rule is that the landlord will subtract the contract price from fair market value in order to determine damages.

=== Eviction ===
A landlord may commence an action through the courts to evict a tenant. Eviction normally takes the form of a lawsuit, requiring an initial notice to a tenant, followed by court proceedings in which the tenant may contest the eviction and potentially file a counter-claim.At the conclusion of the eviction process, if the landlord prevails, the court will issue an order that the property be restored to the possession of the landlord, and potentially allowing for the forcibly removal of the tenant and any property left on the premises.

In some jurisdictions, and subject to conditions such as limited financial means, a tenant facing eviction may be eligible for legal aid.

=== Subsidized and public housing ===
Affordable housing such as subsidized housing has other regulations. Many programs assign rent according to the tenant's income. Therefore, tenants have to report any changes in their income.

=== Duty to mitigate damages ===
At common law, and in some jurisdictions as a statutory obligation, if a tenant breaches a lease and the landlord seeks action against the breaching tenant, the landlord has a duty to mitigate the monetary or economic damages. They must relet or sublease the unit or land in a reasonable manner, such as by showing the premises to potential tenants, advertising the premises as available, and refrain from seeking unreasonably high rent in order to keep the premises vacant or rejecting the applications of reasonable replacement tenants. Additionally, where subletting is allowed, if a tenant makes arrangements to assign or sublease the premises the landlord has the right to refuse certain replacement tenants as unacceptable, but must act reasonably and in good faith. In the event that the landlord fails to fulfill a duty to mitigate damages, that failure may limit or prevent their recovery of damages from the tenant.

== Jurisdiction-specific ==
In the United States, most landlord-tenant law is state-specific.

=== Massachusetts ===
Massachusetts allows eviction of tenants with leases for cause, including lease violations, failure to pay rent, and use of the rental property for illegal purposes. Tenants who do not have a lease term may be evicted either for cause or without cause upon proper notice.

=== Missouri ===
Missouri, which follows most of the majority rules, holds that landlords have the right to be unreasonable in their duty to mitigate damages. Further, they do not have to entertain subleases or assignments from tenants whatsoever, reasonable or not. Landlords have much more discretion than in the general rule.

=== Texas ===
For the majority of Texas history, landlord-tenant relationships were governed by principles of old English common law. The common law was harsh to tenants. Texas tenants leased their property "as is" under the common law doctrine of caveat emptor, Latin for "let the buyer beware." The tenant was expected to carefully inspect the property before signing their lease. Afterwards, they were expected to continue paying rent even if the property became uninhabitable. Of course, landlords and tenants could contract for the landlord to make needed repairs and maintain the condition otherwise, but there was no legal duty to do so. The default was that the tenant's duty to pay rent was independent of the landlord's duty to maintain or repair the premises.

Texas started offering its tenants stronger protections in 1978. That year, the Texas Supreme Court decided Kamarath v. Bennett. In that case, the Texas Supreme Court held that all residential leases contain an "implied warranty of habitability." The "implied warranty" changed the game. It required all landlords to keep their property "habitable," even if the residential lease did not specifically require them to make any repairs. And on top of that, it conditioned the tenant's duty to pay rent on the landlord's duty to keep the property habitable. That is, tenants had the legal right to stop paying rent if the landlord failed to keep the property habitable. In one fell swoop, the Texas Supreme Court struck a huge victory for Texas tenants.

The court-created "implied warranty of habitability" lasted for about a year. In 1979, the Texas legislature swiftly responded by enacting Section 92 of the Texas Property Code. That statute comprehensively governs Texas landlord-tenant relationships. Specifically, it codified the landlord's duty to keep the property habitable, and it provided further clarifications. Now, per Texas statutory law, the landlord has a duty to make a diligent effort to repair or remedy a condition if the tenant gave notice of the condition, the tenant is not delinquent in the payment of rent at the time notice is given, and the condition materially affects the physical health or safety of an ordinary tenant. However, Texas landlords have no duty to repair conditions caused by tenants.

A tenant whose landlord has breached their duty to keep the property habitable has a few different legal options. They can terminate the lease; they can make the repairs themself and then deduct the cost from a subsequent rent payment; or they could take their landlord to court.

== See also ==
- Angie Dickerson
- Arizona Tenants Advocates
- Squatting
