= Arizona Tenants Advocates =

American non-profit organization

- Predecessor: Arizona Tenants Association
- Founded: 2001
- Headquarters: Tempe, Arizona
- Location: United States
- Key people: Kenneth A. Volk
- Website: www.arizonatenants.com

Arizona Tenants Advocates (ATA) was a non-profit renters' union and tenants' rights organization located in Tempe, Arizona. It was founded in 2001 by Kenneth A. Volk, a prominent Arizona tenants' rights advocate.

== Current activity ==
ATA as it exists today primarily helps tenants legally terminate their leases through a break lease program. Additionally, they help prepare letters in response to landlord-tenant disputes. However, the office also functions as a free hotline that helps provide answers to various landlord-tenant questions. Volk noted in a 2006 issue of Global Tenant that "[f]requent topics include evictions, unlawful landlord access, wrongful deposit withholding, landlord seizure of tenants’ personal property, failure to supply essential services or do repairs, and status of leases upon expiration or when a property is conveyed to a new owner."

Due to the excessive heat in some parts of Arizona, air conditioning is regulated as an essential utility in the state. As a result, the organization reportedly receives frequent questions regarding landlord refusals to remedy broken AC units.

== History ==
ATA has existed in many different incarnations over the years. However, Kenneth A. Volk's interest in tenants' rights began in 1993 when an Arizona State University student knocked on his door inquiring for help regarding a caved-in ceiling. Following that, activists and tenants coalesced as Arizona Tenants Association in 1994. This organization would eventually become Arizona Tenants Advocates.

The group lobbied against anti-tenant legislation between 1994–2000. One of the group's crowning achievements was establishing Tempe's rental housing code in 1997, a first for the state. Around 1998, Volk began activities to help tenants legally break their leases under his proprietorship. In 2001, Arizona Tenants Advocates filed with the Arizona Corporation Commission.

Over the years, the organization has faced several challenges, especially during the 2008 financial crisis—when many renters suddenly found themselves being kicked out of foreclosed rental properties. Around this time, ATA reported receiving 20–30 calls a week from renters whose landlords had not paid their mortgages.

ATA has also frequently clashed with Rentals Tempe and its owner, Tim Wright. Wright, as of 2003, owned approximately 160 rental properties and had 65 pending civil cases in Tempe justice courts. Additionally, he was involved in more lawsuits than any other landlord in Tempe.

In 2012, Volk also formed an associated organization called Tenants Union of Arizona.

In 2015, Volk commented on a case wherein a landlord claimed he was owed a pet deposit from a disabled veteran who used a service dog. He said that cases like this were frequent, and that landlords will often try to "extort" tenants by making claims to money they are not legally entitled to.

Much of Volk and ATA's work over the years has been to provide a foil against what Volk feels is a primarily landlord-biased court system.

== See also ==
- Landlord–tenant law
- Right to housing
- Chicago Freedom Movement
- KC Tenants
- Centre on Housing Rights and Evictions
