= Uniform Residential Landlord and Tenant Act =

The Uniform Residential Landlord and Tenant Act, also known as URLTA, is a sample law governing residential landlord and tenant interactions, created in 1972 by the National Conference of Commissioners on Uniform State Laws in the United States.

Many states have adopted all or part of this Act.

== See also ==
- Landlord and Tenant Act
