= Eviction =

Removal of a tenant from rental property by the landlord

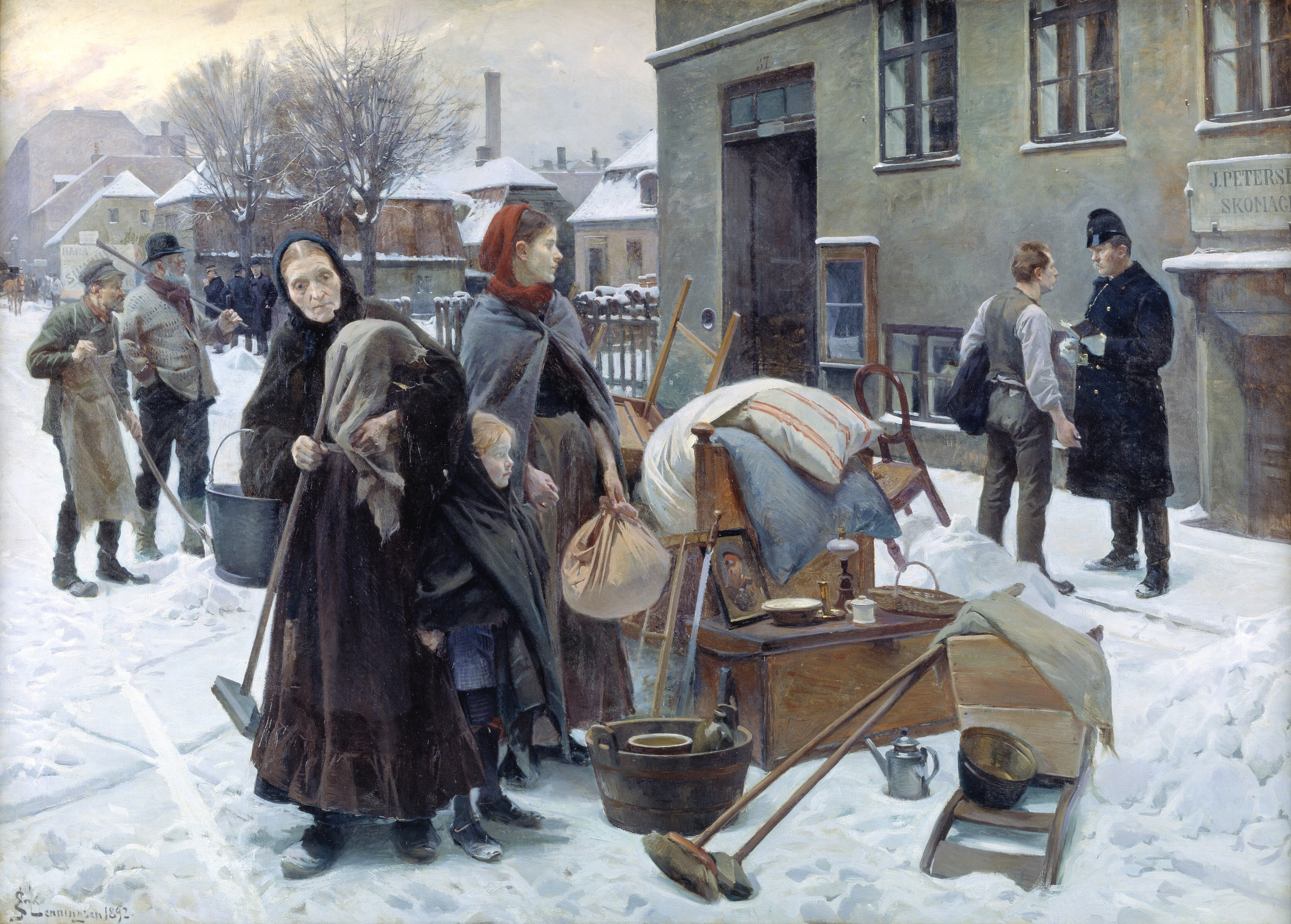
Erik Henningsen's painting Eviction held by the National Gallery of Denmark.1892

RIC and Hussars at an eviction-Ireland 1888

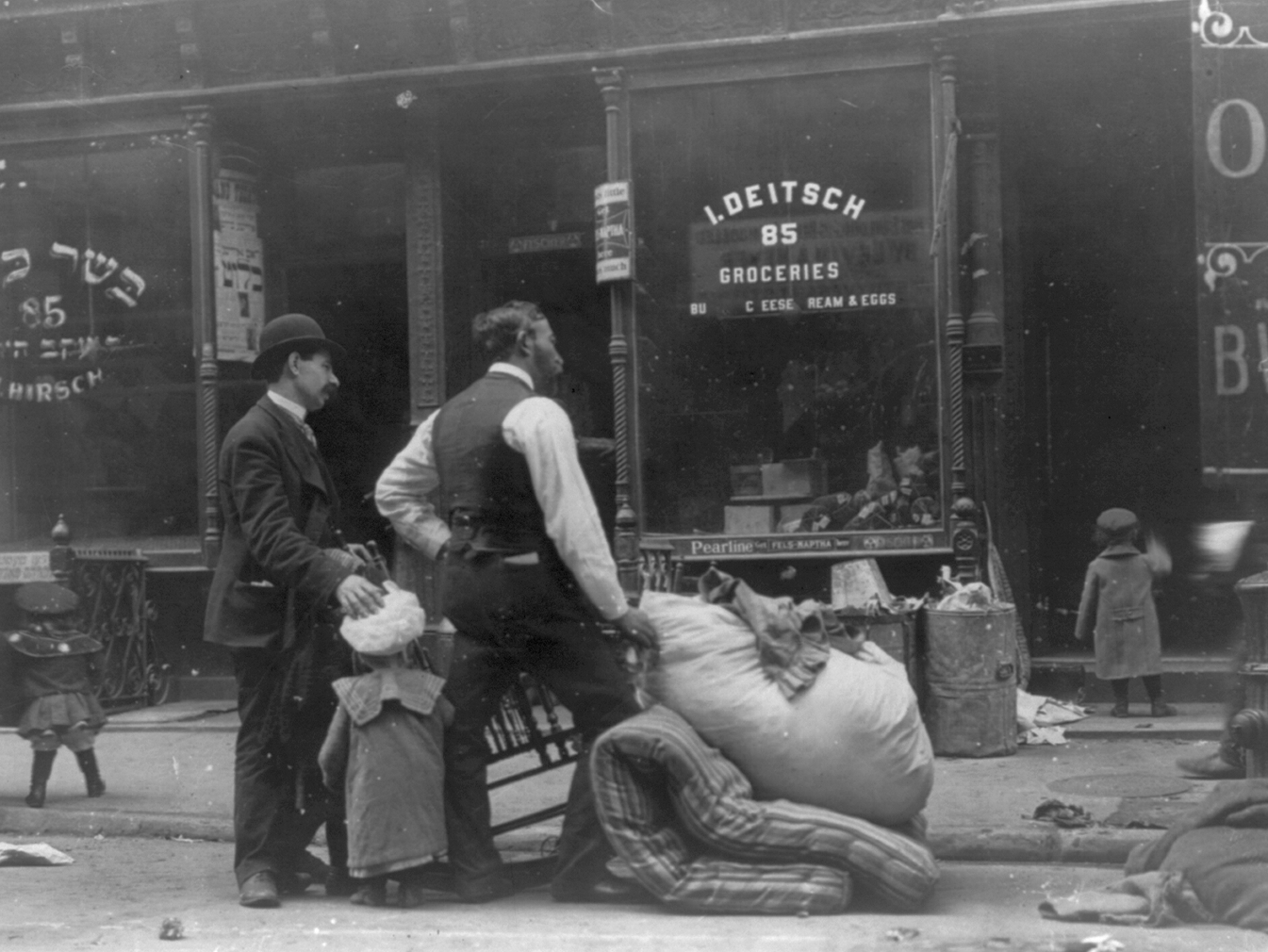
Two men with children, being evicted, stand with their possessions on the sidewalk, circa 1910, on the Lower East Side of New York City.

Eviction is the removal of a tenant from rental property by the landlord. In some jurisdictions it may also involve the removal of persons from premises that were foreclosed by a mortgagee (often, the prior owners who defaulted on a mortgage).

Depending on the laws of the jurisdiction, eviction may also be known as unlawful detainer, summary possession, summary dispossess, summary process, forcible detainer, ejectment, and repossession, among other terms. Nevertheless, the term eviction is the most commonly used in communications between the landlord and tenant. Depending on the jurisdiction involved, before a tenant can be evicted, a landlord must win an eviction lawsuit or prevail in another step in the legal process. It should be borne in mind that eviction, as with ejectment and certain other related terms, has precise meanings only in certain historical contexts (e.g., under the English common law of past centuries), or with respect to specific jurisdictions. In present-day practice and procedure, there has come to be a wide variation in the content of these terms from jurisdiction to jurisdiction.

The legal aspects, procedures, and provisions for eviction, by whatever name, vary even between countries or states with similar legal structures.

== The eviction process ==
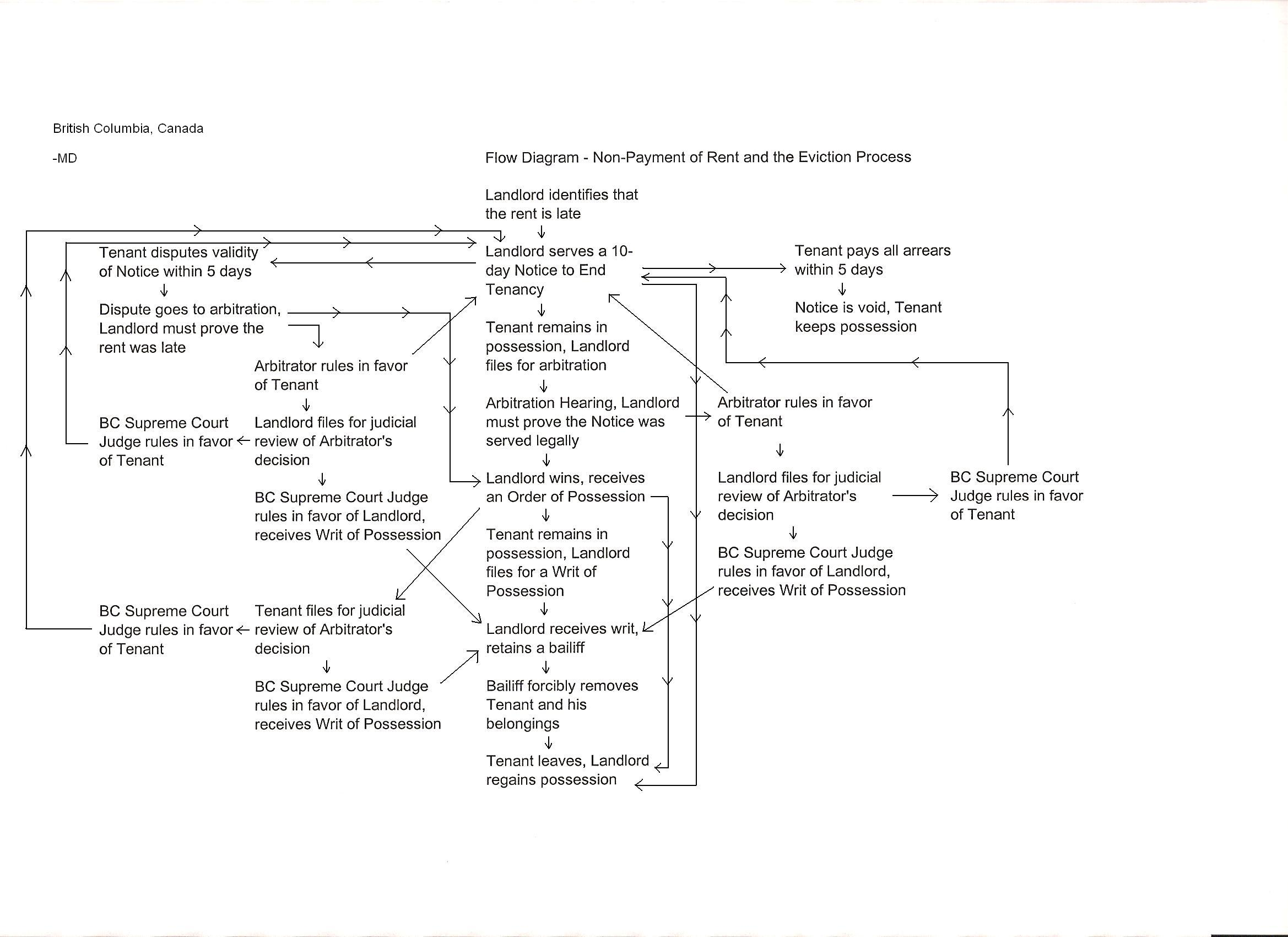
Flow Diagram of the Eviction Process in British Columbia, Canada

Most jurisdictions do not permit the landlord to evict a tenant without first taking legal action to do so (commonly referred to as a "self-help" eviction; such actions include changing locks, removing items from the premises, or terminating utility services). Such evictions are generally illegal at any time during the process (including after a landlord wins an eviction suit); a tenant facing such measures may sue the landlord. However, self-help evictions may be permitted in some jurisdictions when commercial tenants are involved, as opposed to residential tenants.

=== Notice ===
Prior to filing a suit in court for eviction, generally the landlord must provide written notice to the tenant (commonly called a notice to quit or notice to vacate). The residential and commercial ordinances created jurisdictions preventing landlords from taking any action that may force a tenant out of their premises. These actions include, but are not limited to, force and threats, removing essential services, demolishing the property, or interfering with entrance locks.

=== Lawsuit and trial ===
If the tenant remains in possession of the property after the notice to vacate has expired, the landlord can then serve the tenant with a lawsuit.

Depending on the jurisdiction, the tenant may be required to submit a written response by a specified date, after which time another date is set for the trial. Other jurisdictions may simply require the tenant to appear in court on a specified date. Eviction cases are often expedited since the issue is time-sensitive (the landlord loses rental income while the tenant remains in possession). A jury trial may be requested by either party; however, until the late 2000s that was very uncommon.

Many of the defendants in eviction case do not show up for court. In many major cities, including Milwaukee, as many as 70% of defendants are no-shows. In the courts in some urban areas only 10% of defendants showed up.

=== Removal from the property ===
As mentioned above, most jurisdictions do not allow a landlord to evict a tenant without legal action being taken first, even if the landlord is successful in court.

Instead, the landlord would have to obtain a writ of possession or warrant of removal from the court and present it to the appropriate law enforcement officer. The officer then posts a notice for the tenant on the property that the officer will remove the tenant and any other people on the property, though some jurisdictions will not enforce the writ if, on that day, inclement weather is taking place.

With the removal of the tenant also comes the removal of their personal belongings. If the tenant leaves behind anything of value, there is a custom (but no law in some jurisdictions) for the landlord to hold onto their left-behind belongings for 30 days. After these 30 days the landlord is able to sell the left-behind property, usually in an auction, to satisfy any overdue rent arrears.

== No-fault evictions ==
A no-fault eviction occurs when a landlord seeks to regain possession of a rented property under laws that do not require him to allege any fault on the part of the tenant such as failure to pay rent, disturbance to neighbors or other tenants in the building, or violation of lease terms. In many jurisdictions, a tenancy at will, as opposed to a term lease tenancy, may be ended at any time with a minimum of thirty days' notice to tenant, although some jurisdictions require longer notice periods.

As gentrification and the re-population of urban centers by wealthier residents takes place, no-fault evictions are used as a tool to displace tenants in cities with rent control. In California, for example, the Ellis Act allows eviction of rent-controlled tenants if the landlord intends to no longer rent any portion of an apartment building (i.e., landlords cannot be compelled to rent). The Ellis Act has been applied to rentals in San Francisco, Santa Monica and Los Angeles.

== Just-cause evictions ==
Just cause eviction, also known as good cause eviction, describes laws that aim to provide tenants protection from unreasonable evictions, rent hikes, and non-renewal of lease agreements. These laws allow tenants to challenge evictions in court when they are not considered to be legitimate evictions. Generally, landlords oppose just-cause eviction laws due to concerns over profit, housing stock, and court cases.

=== Renoviction ===
Renoviction is a term used when a tenant is evicted to renovate a property. A landlord may perform a renoviction to raise the cost of rent for other prospective tenants. In some jurisdictions, such as Ontario, evicted tenants have the right of first refusal.

== Retaliatory eviction ==
Retaliatory eviction occurs when a landlord seeks to evict a tenant in response to the tenant's exercise of legal rights, such as reporting housing code violations, withholding rent for habitability issues, or organizing with other tenants. Most jurisdictions provide statutory protections that create a rebuttable presumption of retaliation if an eviction occurs within a specified period (typically 90 days to one year) after protected tenant activity. Under these laws, the burden shifts to the landlord to prove the eviction is based on legitimate grounds unrelated to the tenant's protected conduct, such as nonpayment of rent or substantial lease violations.

== Real estate mobbing ==
Real estate mobbing, also known as property mobbing, is the use of mobbing (group bullying) techniques by real estate speculators to constructively or forcibly evict a resident from their dwelling. The United Nations has recognized real estate mobbing as a worldwide cause of forced eviction. Real estate mobbing is acknowledged as a problem in Europe and particularly in Spain.

== Countries ==
=== Australia ===
If the tenant is on a fixed term tenancy and their lease is coming to an end, a landlord will be required to give them a valid notice to vacate. The period of this notice varies from state to state. If the tenant will not cooperate with the parameters of an eviction notice, application is made to the Tenancy Tribunal for possession of the property.

A landlord cannot legally evict a tenant without obtaining a Possession Order and a Warrant of Possession. A Warrant of Possession directs the police to evict a tenant from the property. The police then contact the agent to arrange a time to go to the property, see the tenants off the premises, change the locks and formally take possession. The eviction must always be carried out by the police; the landlord cannot evict tenants themselves. Taking the law into own hands and failing to act according to the relevant legislation in jurisdiction will carry penalties for a landlord.

On March 29, 2020, Prime Minister Scott Morrison revealed that state and territories governments will be moving to put a moratorium on evictions of persons as a result of financial distress caused by the COVID-19 pandemic. The government said these measures were set to last for at least six months.

=== Cambodia ===
Human rights activists are increasingly worried that forced evictions in Cambodia are spiralling out of control. An Amnesty International report shows how, contrary to Cambodia's obligations under international human rights law, those affected by evictions have had no opportunity for genuine participation and consultation beforehand. Information on planned evictions and on resettlement packages has been incomplete and inaccurate, undermining the rights of those affected to information, and to participate in decisions which affect the exercise of their human rights, in particular the right to adequate housing. The lack of legal protection from forced eviction, and lack of regulation of existing standards has left an accountability gap which increases the vulnerability of marginalized people, particularly those living in poverty, to human rights abuses including forced evictions.

=== China ===
Land requisition in the People's Republic of China refers to the practice of involuntarily requisitioning land from a citizen or resident, typically in order to make room for development projects. In some instances, government authorities work with private developers to seize land from villagers, with compensation below the market price. In many cases, they are also offered alternative housing instead of or on top of monetary compensation. Forced evictions are particularly common in rural areas, and are a major source of unrest and public protest. By some estimates, up to 65 percent of the 180,000 annual "mass incidents" stem from grievances over forced evictions. Some citizens who resist or protest the evictions have reportedly been subjected to harassment, beatings, or detention.

The rate of forced evictions has grown significantly since the 1990s, as city and county-level governments have increasingly come to rely on land sales as an important source of revenue. In 2011, the Financial Times reported that 40 percent of local government revenue comes from land sales. Guan Qingyou, a professor at Tsinghua University, estimated that land sales accounted for 74 percent of local government income in 2010.

=== Indonesia ===
One cause of homelessness in Indonesia is forced evictions. According to researchers, between the years 2000 and 2005 over 92,000 people were forcefully evicted from their homes.

=== Nigeria ===
Forced evictions are an integral aspect of human rights violation. They comprise the forceful removal of persons without their assent and against their will on a temporary or permanent basis from their homeland, normal place of abode without clear preparations for adequate compensation and relocation. This increases the problems of displacement of individuals and homelessness in countries. Governments at different levels continue to forcefully evict people without adequate compensation in some African countries including Nigeria which is estimated to have the largest urban slum population in sub Saharan Africa in terms of size and percentage of the total population. Centre on Housing Rights and Evictions (COHRE) has labelled Nigeria as a consistent violator of housing rights.

The Nigerian government forcefully evicted over 2 million people between 2000 and 2009. In Lagos State alone, between 2003 and 2015, communities in Makoko Yaba, Ijora East, Ijora Badiya, PURA-NPA Bar Beach, Ikota Housing Estate, Ogudu Ori-Oke, Mosafejo in Oshodi, Agric-Owutu, Ageologo-Mile 12, and Mile 2 Okokomaiko have been forcefully evicted under the guise of development. Between July and September 2000, at least 50,000 people in Abuja were evicted without prior notices or adequate alternative accommodation. The evictions were done to move communities/settlements who government claimed had distorted the Abuja Development Master Plan.

In Lagos State, Nigeria, the forced evictions are done with the major purpose of reclaiming the land and building luxury apartments as the population of the country continue to soar creating housing deficits. However, this breeds discrimination and inequality as the new buildings do not fulfill any housing need for the general populace. In July 2016, the Lagos State Ministry of Waterfront Infrastructure Development after a notice of 72hrs forcefully evicted residents of Makoko, a waterfront community made up of six villages - Oko Agbon, Adogbo, Migbewhe, Yanshiwhe, Sogunro and Apollo without a court order. This rendered an estimated 30,000 people homeless. Makoko is one of the nine communities targeted in the $200 Million World Bank-funded Lagos Metropolitan Development and Governance Project (LMDGP) of the Lagos State government for urbanization, waste management, drainage and water supply. The community which has been in existent for more than 100yrs is said to have started as a settlement of fishermen from Togo and the Republic of Benin.

At least 266 structures in Badia East community, Lagos State which were being used as homes and businesses were pulled down in February 2013, by the State government. The Resettlement Action Plan which was agreed to in April 2013 did not have clear-cut remedies for adequate resettlement of the displaced persons. Badia is one of the communities slated for urbanization through upgrading from being a slum in the $200 million World Bank-funded Lagos Metropolitan Development and Governance Project (LMDGP). The project specifies minimal involuntary resettlement and where absolutely necessary such must have been discussed and agreed on with the residents including adequate notice, compensation and well spelt-out resettlement plans.

Between 2016 and 2017, Otodo-Gbame an ancestral fishing community and Ilubrin community were forcefully sacked from their homes with fatalities after 12 days of written eviction notice. On 17 March 2017, despite a January 2017 court injunction, Itedo, a waterfront community of more than 35,000 persons was forcefully evicted early in the morning while some were still asleep. In 2019, a UN Special Rapporteur on right to adequate housing asked that Nigerian government declares a nationwide moratorium on forced evictions.

On 20 January 2020 residents of Tarkwa Bay, a waterfront community, was forcefully evicted by security personnel in what has been termed a gross violation of human rights. Oil theft through the pipelines along the beach is the reason given by government authorities for the forced evictions.

=== United States ===
In the United States of America, rules for evictions and the eviction process are determined by state, county, and city rules.

== Impacts on those being evicted ==
=== Eviction record ===
Evictions can remain on a tenant's record for up to seven years in the United States, and landlords are typically allowed to reject tenants due to previous evictions. Public eviction records can be a barrier to entry to housing, leading tenants into emergency shelters after failing tenant screening at multiple apartments.

Some American jurisdictions have sealed eviction records to prevent blanket denial of tenants with an eviction history.

=== Mental health ===
There are sometimes communication problems for when the actual eviction date is decided upon, leaving some evictees thoroughly underprepared with nothing packed when the sheriff comes. This can lead to a Skinner box–like experience as evictees sometimes try "riding" the eviction out. (This is sometimes caused by denial.)

Evictees experience higher rates of: depression, anxiety, high blood pressure, post-traumatic stress disorder (PTSD), and even suicide. The process of eviction can take a long time (potentially months) and this can leave the evictee in a heightened state of stress, which makes them more susceptible to stress illnesses. Even after years have passed, studies show that evictees are less happy, optimistic and energetic than those who have not been evicted.

=== Economic effects ===
Being evicted can increase rates of job loss. A person is 15% more likely to be laid off after experiencing eviction. This can lead to a cycle where the eviction makes it difficult to work but not working can lead to eviction. Evictions are a leading cause of homelessness.

Evictees often end up moving into poorer quality housing, like overcrowded homes. A study that looked at Milwaukee, Wisconsin found that renters who had been involuntarily moved from a prior residence were 25% more likely to experience long-term housing problems than their peers who had only moved voluntarily.

== See also ==
- Accumulation by dispossession – Policies to centralize wealth and power
- Cure or quit
- Ejectment – Common law term
- Eviction resistance – Strategy used by tenants to resist evictions
- Forced evictions in China
- Foreclosure – Legal process where a lender recoups an unpaid loan
- Forcible entry – Act of entering a property by force
- Lease – Contract to use an asset by paying the owner
- Monopoly on violence
- Population transfer – Movement of a large group of people from one region to another
- Quiet title – Lawsuit over ownership of real property
- Retaliatory eviction
- Soldal v. Cook County
- Tenant right to counsel
- The Registry
- Unlawful eviction and harassment – Criminal offence in the UK
