= List of rent strikes =

The following is a list of specific rent strikes—tenants refusing to pay some or all of their rent.

== Definition ==
A rent strike is a collective direct action where tenants refuse to pay rent to landlords as a leverage of bargining power.

== Chronological list of rent strikes ==
| Date | Strike | Place | Country |
|---|---|---|---|
| 1839–1845 | Anti-Rent War | Upstate, New York State | United States |
| 1864 | PEI Tenant League rent strike | Prince Edward Island | Canada |
| 1904 | 1904 New York City rent strike | New York City | United States |
| 1907 | Broom strike of 1907 | Buenos Aires | Argentina |
| 1907–1908 | 1907 New York City rent strike | New York City | United States |
| 1915 | 1915 Glasgow rent strikes | Glasgow | Scotland |
| 1918–1920 | 1918–1920 New York City rent strikes | New York City | United States |
| 1920-1921 | 1920–1921 Chicago rent strikes | Chicago | United States |
| 1925 | 1925 Tenant Movement | Panama City and Colón | Panama |
| 1931 | 1931 Barcelona rent strike | Barcelona | Spain |
| 1936–1937 | 1936–1937 Gothenburg rent strike | Olskroken, Gothenburg | Sweden |
| 1965–1968 | Tulare labor camps rent strike | Tulare County, California | United States |
| 1966 | 1966 West Side Rent Strike | West Side, Chicago | United States |
| 1970–1973 | 1970–1973 Republic of Ireland rent strikes | nationwide | Republic of Ireland |
| 1971 | Anti-internment rent and rates strike | nationwide | Northern Ireland |
| 1972–1973 | Kirkby Rent Strike | Kirkby | England |
| 1985-1990 | Soweto rent strikes | Soweto | South Africa |
| 2017 | 2017 Parkdale rent strike | Parkdale, Toronto | Canada |
| 2017-2018 | Mariachi Plaza Rent Strike | Boyle Heights, Los Angeles | United States |
| 2018 | Burlington Ave. rent strike | Westlake, Los Angeles | United States |
| 2020-2025 | Hillside Villa rent strike | Chinatown, Los Angeles | United States |
| 2023-2024 | 33 King St. & 22 John St. rent strike | Weston, Toronto | Canada |
| 2023-2024 | Lawrence Ave W rent strike | Toronto | Canada |
| 2023-2025 | Thorncliffe Park Drive rent strike | Toronto | Canada |
| 2023-present | Union of Pinnacle Tenants rent strike | New York City | United States |
| 2024–2025 | 2024 Kansas City metropolitan area rent strike | Kansas City metropolitan area | United States |
| 2025–present | 2025 rent strike against Capital Realty Group | Seven locations nationwide | United States |
| 2026–present | 2026 Parkdale rent strike | Parkdale, Toronto | Canada |

== See also ==
- List of tenant union federations
- List of labour strikes
