= Swedish Union of Tenants =

Swedish tenant association

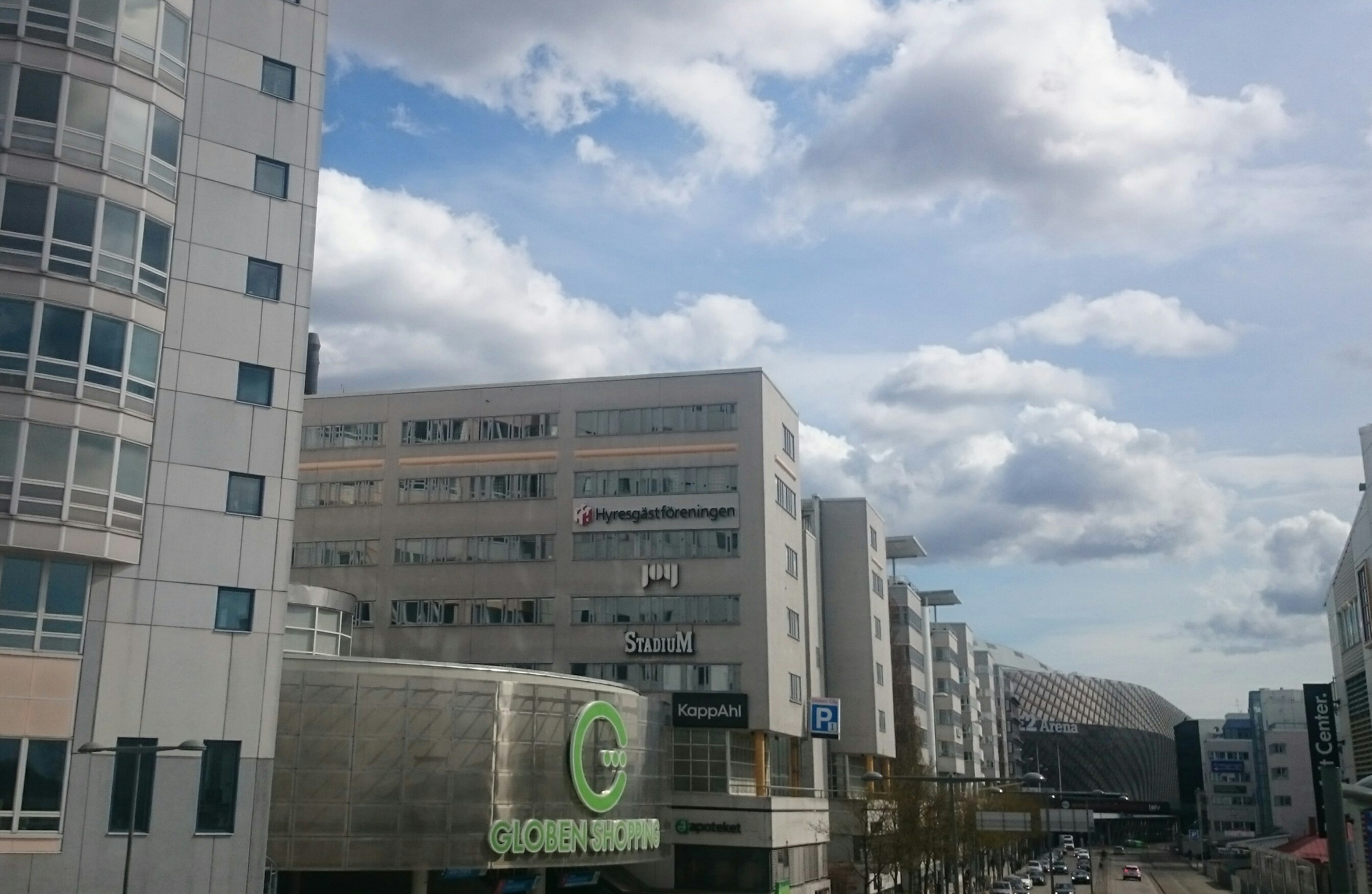
The Tenants' Association's office is on Arenavägen in the Globen area .

The Swedish Tenants Union (Swedish: Hyresgästföreningen) is a membership organization and tenants union in Sweden. Marie Linder has been the union's president since 2019.

== History ==
The first tenant association was founded in the late 19th century. The oldest association still in existence is the association in Nynäshamn, which was founded in 1915. In 1923, eight tenant associations merged to form the National Union of Tenants. In 1924, the Tenants' Savings and Building Association (HSB) was founded by the Tenants' Union in Stockholm.

== Operation ==
The Tenants' Union has 528,000 members who receive advice and support in their contacts with landlords. According to the Tenants' Association, the operating principle is "making sure everyone has the right to good housing at affordable cost" and the vision is: "secure housing that promotes human and social development". The Tenant's Union participates in the rent control system in Sweden which has caused severe housing shortages in certain areas.

Of the association's approximately 800 employees, in 2010, just over 100 were member recruiters who worked full-time recruiting members by telephone or through home visits.

=== Rent negotiation and rent setting fee ===
A negotiation agreement may stipulate that the rent for all apartments covered by the negotiation scheme shall include a certain amount as compensation to the tenant organisation for its negotiation work. The negotiation agreement shall state how much of the rent constitutes compensation of this kind. The amount may not exceed what can be considered reasonable taking into account the rent in general, the size of the negotiation costs and other circumstances. — Section 20, Act (1978:304) Rent Negotiation Act

The main area of activity of the Tenants' Union today is to negotiate rents with the public housing companies and private property owners. Until 1 January 2011, the agreed rents constituted a kind of rent ceiling for other equivalent apartments in the locality. However, the municipal housing companies no longer have a role in setting rent standards. Instead, collectively negotiated rents - regardless of the contracting parties - should be the standard when assessing the reasonableness of rent. The Tenants' Unions negotiates almost all rents in Sweden, even for those who are not members of the Tenants' Association. There are a few other competing Tenants' Associations.

The rent setting fee is a fee that the Tenants' Unions charges for negotiating rents and is paid by the tenant to the landlord through the rent regardless of whether the tenant is a member of the Tenants' Unions or not. From 2011, the fee is 12 kronor per apartment and month (144 kronor per year). The landlord retains 5 kronor of the 144 kronor of the rent setting fee for the work of forwarding the amount to the Tenants' Association. Tenants do not pay a fee for negotiating their own rent. Tenants who do not want to pay the fee can contact their landlord, though some were forced to pay. The Tenants' Unions has previously been rejected in cases where a minority of tenants wanted the Tenants' Unions as negotiator.

In 2015, the income from the rent setting fee was approximately 200 million kronor (25 percent of the Tenants' Association's total income). For 2016, approximately 1,500,000 rents were negotiated, for which they received compensation of approximately 216 million kronor, which was paid by tenants. Critics of the system have questioned, among other things, whether the procedure is in line with fundamental principles of negative freedom of association.

The system was reported to the European Court of Justice in 2010. In the autumn of 2018, a tenant reported his municipal housing company LKF to the Swedish Competition Authority for violating the Public Procurement Act when the tenant claimed that the rent setting fee was payment for a consultancy service. The case was later closed because the Swedish Competition Authority found that the relationship between the landlord and the Tenants' Unions is regulated by the Rent Negotiation Act and the existing negotiation procedure, and that it therefore falls outside the Swedish Competition Authority's supervisory mandate.

=== Legal service ===
The Tenants' Unions offers legal assistance in matters relating to changes in rental terms and refunds of unreasonable rent for its members.

== Organization ==
The union's chairman since 2014 is Marie Linder, former head of communications at LO. The Tenants' Unions is organized at four levels: local, municipal, regional and national. At each level, members appoint elected representatives to boards and other positions. The elected representatives make the overall decisions about how the operations are to be run.

The following information is the association's own information from 2018.

- Number of members: 538,000 households
- Number of elected members: approximately 8,600
- Number of employees: 860
- Number of local tenants' associations: 1,220
- Number of associations: 139
- Number of regions: 9

=== Member magazine ===
The member magazine Vår bostad was closed down in 2006 and was replaced by Hem & Hyra.

=== Sister business ===
The Tenants' Unions with Riksbyggen finances the sister organization Jagvillhabostad.nu. The association also started the forum Boinstitutet in 2017.

== Relationship with the Social Democrats ==
The association is non-partisan but has ties to the labor movement including through its membership in the student union ABF and the Olof Palme International Center.

Many of the association's elected representatives and decision-makers have a past within the Social Democrats and LO. All union chairmen have had a background within the Social Democrats. For example, former union chairwoman Barbro Engman has been a member of parliament for the Social Democrats, and union chairwoman Marie Linder was previously head of communications at LO.

In 2007, it was found that of 105 elected representatives in the federal and regional boards and top officials, one fifth were elected representatives in the labor movement. The overrepresentation of Social Democrats increased closer to the top of the hierarchy and in the federal board, 8 out of 14 members were active in the labor movement. None of the 105 officials was a moderate, People's Party member, Christian Democrat or Green Party member.

In 2018, Hem & Hyra conducted a survey of twelve salaried employees who were running for office in the 2018 election, and of them, nine were Social Democrats and two were left-wing parties.

The Tenants' Association's election leader Markus Selin is vice chairman of the Social Democrats in Täby. In 2018, Selin ran a personal election campaign as number 14 on the Social Democrats' parliamentary list. The Tenants' Union has repeatedly run election campaigns in line with the Social Democrats' policies.

== Federation Chairs ==
- Barbro Engman (2000–2014)
- Marie Linder (2014– )

== Image gallery ==
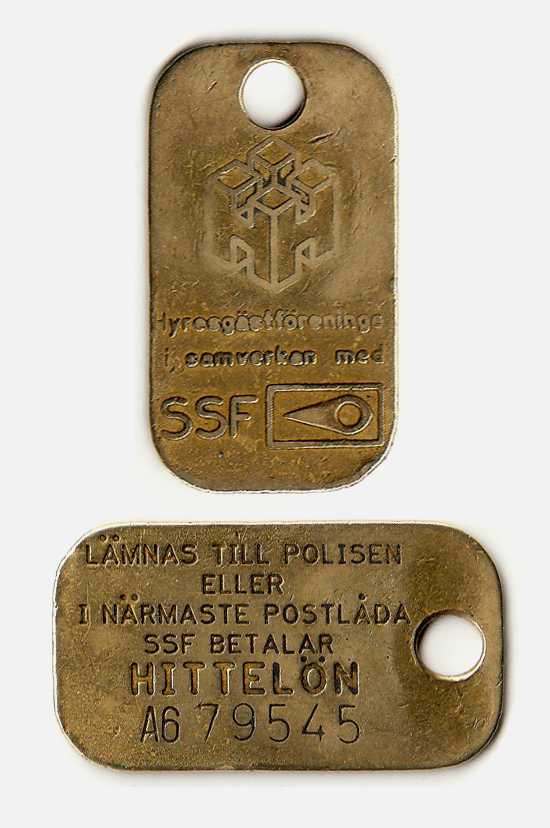
A key tag from the Tenants' Union in collaboration with SSF from around 1985. Anyone who found a set of keys with this key tag from the Swedish Union of Tenants in the 80s received a small reward.

== See also ==
- Housing authority
- International Union of Tenants
