= Tenants' Association of Austria =

Austrian tenants association

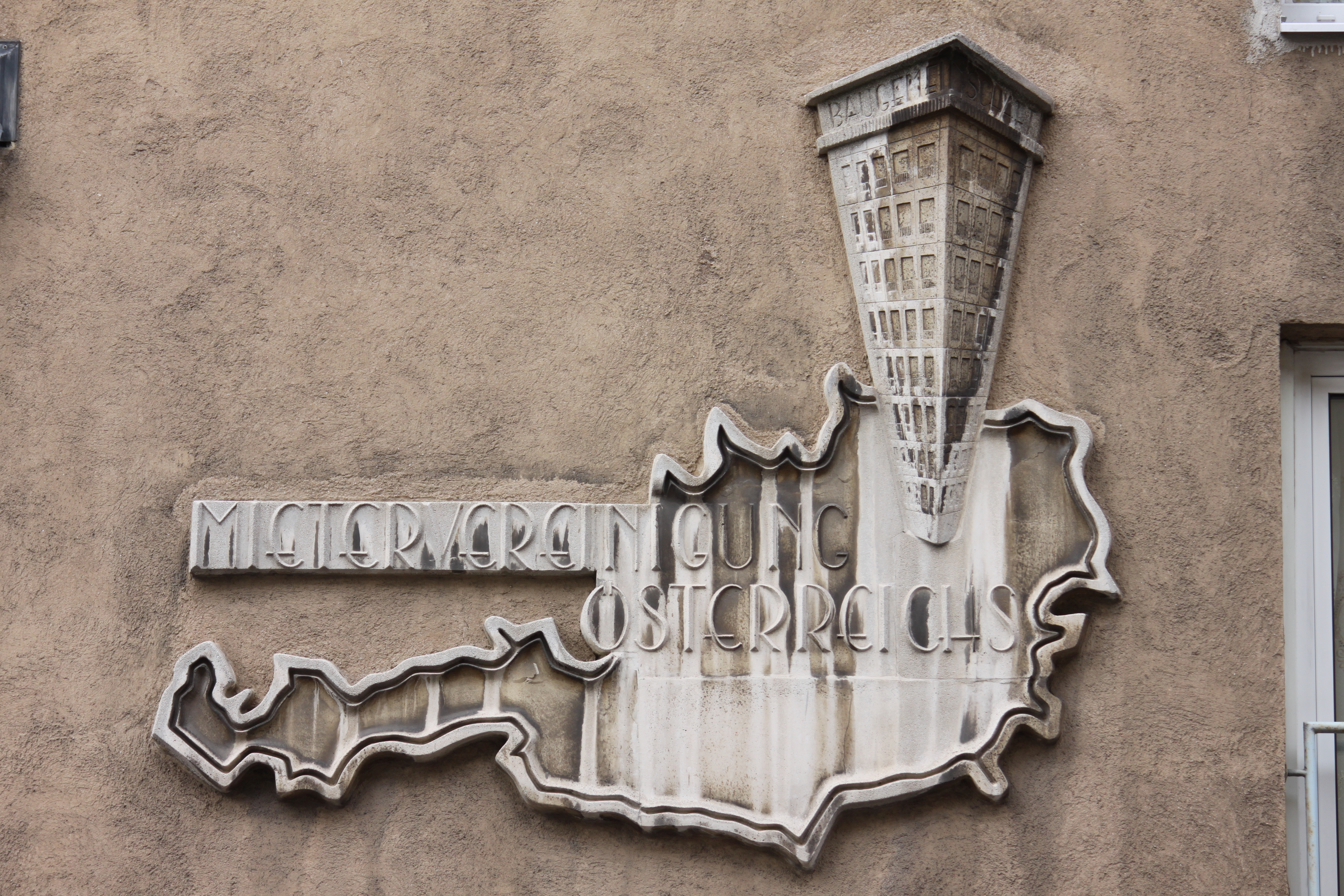
Logo of the Austrian Tenants' Association on a residential complex in Vienna-Brigittenau

The Austrian Tenants' Association (MVÖ) is an Austrian association dedicated to improving people's housing conditions and to advocating for this goal both politically and in specific cases. It also offers legal advice and representation. The tenants' association is considered to be close to the Social Democratic Party (SPÖ).

The association is the umbrella organization for the regional organizations represented in each federal state. It is also a founding member of the International Union of Tenants. The association's headquarters are in Vienna.

As of 2008, the MVÖ employs 61 people throughout Austria, and there are also 230 volunteers.

Georg Niedermühlbichler has been president since March 29, 2008.

== History ==
Until 1917, the free market economy had a firm grip on the Austrian housing market. Terminations could occur at any time without giving reasons, and rents were set arbitrarily. The majority of Viennese residents lived in small apartments (rooms, kitchens, sometimes with closets), with households typically comprising six or more people. It was also the era of the so-called "bed lodgers." In working-class families, 58% of people did not have their own bed.

As recently as 1917, 92% of Viennese apartments lacked a private toilet and 95% lacked a running water supply. At that time, Vienna was second to Budapest in tuberculosis.

These miserable conditions were the basis for the emergence of a tenants’ movement, which culminated in the founding of the Austrian Tenants’ Association on February 25, 1911, which was then still called the “General Tenants’ Association.”

From the outset, the organization's goal was to bring about a general improvement in housing conditions—a daunting task considering the initial situation. The number of members quickly grew, initially to 77,000, and then to 381,000 by 1934.

During the First World War, there was a general increase in the cost of consumer goods. These increases threatened to result in a corresponding increase in rents, so the then imperial government issued the first tenant protection ordinances in 1917. These led to the freezing of rents at the time and the so-called "Peace Interest." A subsequent ordinance issued on October 26, 1918, also began to regulate tenancy law. While the first two ordinances were temporary, this one was indefinite and, above all, strengthened protection against eviction.

The political developments after the First World War led to a restructuring of the tenants' association, which during this time (1921) also received its current name: Tenants' Association of Austria - MVÖ.

When the Rent Act was finally passed in 1922, the first major step toward improving housing conditions had been successfully completed. This was preceded by tenant demonstrations and the committed advocacy of MVÖ board members Felix Kössler, a lawyer in Vienna, and Robert Danneberg. They had drafted a motion that was submitted to all parliamentary groups. Robert Danneberg, then also a member of the National Council, subsequently introduced this draft to Parliament, resulting in the Rent Act (MG), which entered into force on December 7, 1922.

The Tenant, the association’s newspaper, reported in January 1923: “The new rent law guarantees the rights of tenants for all time and is probably the best rent law in Europe.”

For the first time, protection against termination was introduced and tenant representatives were given the right to inspect landlords’ accounts.

By 1931, the number of members had grown to an impressive 256,244. The strength of the tenants' association, thanks to its large following, put the government under pressure. However, the political developments of the time put an end to this rapid growth, and the association was dissolved.

The confiscated assets were subsequently transferred to the patriotic tenants’ association, because even at that time there was more than one tenants’ movement in Austria.

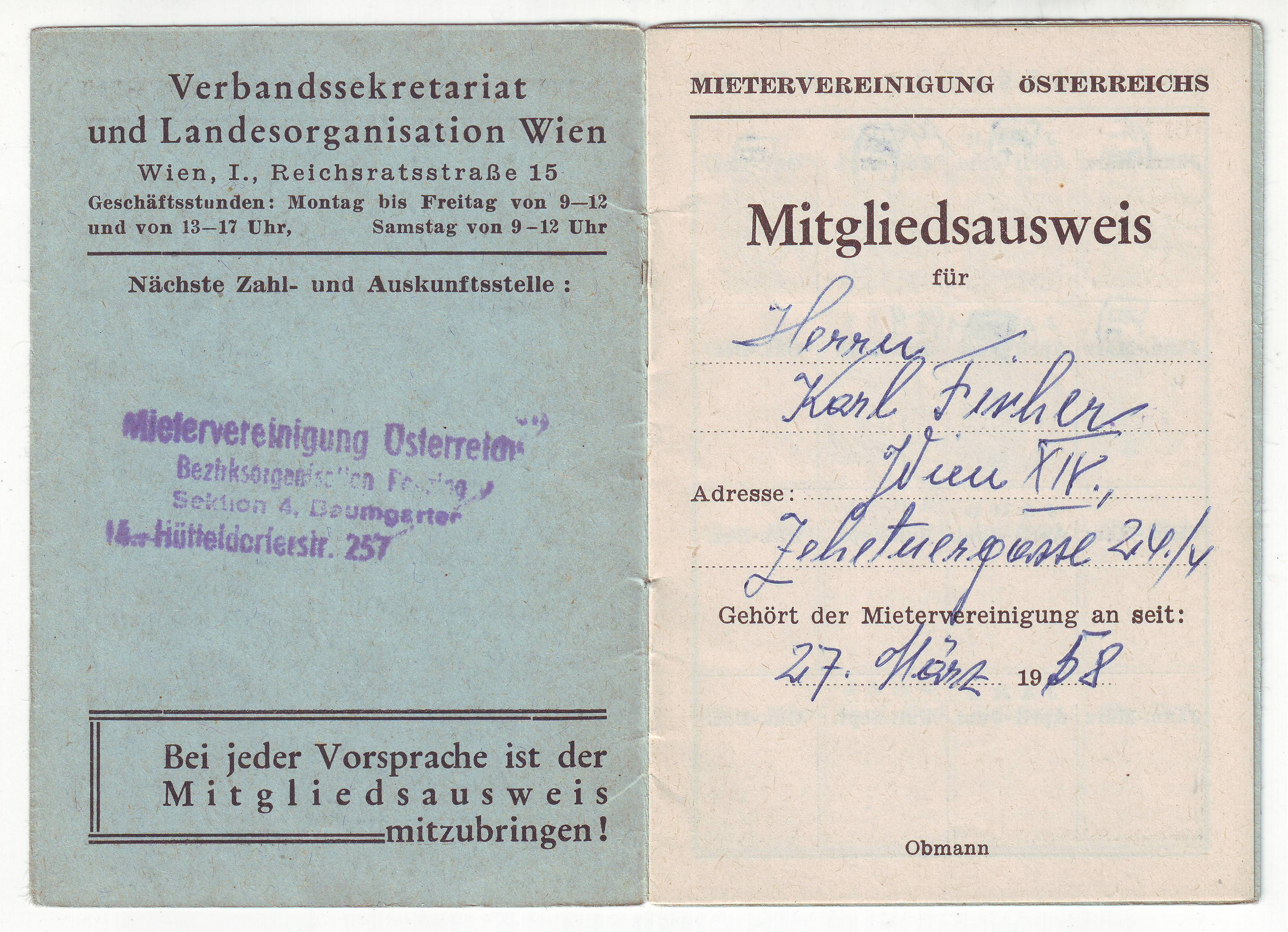
Tenants' Association of Austria, membership card for Karl Fischer, March 27, 1958

On September 11, 1945, the Tenants' Association was authorized to resume its activities, thus beginning a period in which the continuous improvement of the housing situation in Austria was closely linked to the Tenants' Association's work. Its main objective, namely "to bring about a general improvement in housing conditions and to protect and promote the legitimate interests of tenants, homeowners, and all other users of apartments, business premises, and other properties in general, as well as those of its members," remained virtually unchanged in the association's statutes since 1911.

Since the Rent Act, tenant protection in Austria, which is unique in Europe, has been based on the two pillars of protection against termination and price protection and on an underlying economic consideration.

Before the First World War, housing costs amounted to 25% of a worker's wage for a one-room apartment with a kitchen of the lowest standard. By 1929, this figure had been reduced to an average of 2%. From the perspective of the government, the continued existence of tenant protection in its then form was therefore a guarantee of economic growth and economic improvement for broad sections of the population – a view that persisted until the early 1990s.

Only with the introduction of the guideline rent and the location surcharge did a complete departure from this basic principle occur, which is now reflected in the sharp rise in housing costs. The main goal of the tenants' association's political work is therefore to ensure housing affordability, particularly by achieving legal reforms regarding rent determination and ancillary housing costs.

MVÖ calls for clear and effective price limits in rental law. The MVÖ can provide advice when landlords overlook maintenance requests.

== See also ==
- de:Deutscher MieterbundGerman Tenants' Association
- Mieterverband (Switzerland)
