= Tenants' Union =

A tenants' union, or renters' union, is an organisation of tenants.

Tenants' Union may also refer to:

- Tenants' Union of Catalonia – a tenants union in Catalonia, sometimes known in Catalan simply as Tenants' Union
- Tenants' Union (political party) – a minor historical party in Estonia.
