= Solidar =

European network of NGOs working to advance social justice

SOLIDAR is a European network of NGOs working to advance social justice in Europe and worldwide. SOLIDAR voices the concerns of its member organisations to the EU and international institutions across the policy sectors of social affairs, international cooperation, and lifelong learning.

SOLIDAR has 60 member organisations based in 27 countries (22 of which are EU countries), and is active in 90 countries worldwide. Member organisations are national NGOs in Europe, as well as some non-EU and EU-wide organisations, working in one or more relevant fields. The network is brought together by its shared values of solidarity, social equality, and participation.

SOLIDAR works in cooperation with its members, trade unions, political institutions, and civil society actors. SOLIDAR aims to influence policy at the EU and international levels, and link members together to learn from each other and help them carry out projects. The organisation is affiliated with the Progressive Alliance.

== Member organizations ==
As of 2015, there are 34 full member organisations in the SOLIDAR network:

- Arbetarnas Bildningsförbund (ABF), Sweden
- Association Européenne des Droits de l’Homme (AEDH), EU
- Arbejdernes Oplysningsforbund (AOF DK), Denmark
- Studieforbundet AOF (AOF NO), Norway
- Alianza por la Solidaridad (APS), Spain
- Associazione di Promozione Sociale (ARCI), Italy
- Arbeiter-Samariter-Bund (ASB), Germany
- Arbeiter-Samariter-Bund (ASBÖ), Austria
- Auser, Italy
- Arbeiterwohlfahrt (AWO), Germany
- Arbeiterwohlfahrt International (AWO INTL), Germany
- Berufsförderungsinstitut Oberösterreich (BFI OÖ), Austria
- Centres d’Entraînement aux Méthodes d’Education Active (CEMEA), France
- International Cooperation Network (CGIL), Italy
- Community Service Volunteers (CSV), United Kingdom
- Féderation Européenne de l’Education et la Culture (FEEC), France
- Fagligt Internationalt Center (FIC), Denmark
- Fonds voor Ontwikkelingssamenwerking - Socialistische Solidariteit (FOS), Belgium
- General Federation of Trade Unions (GFTU), UK
- Humanitas, The Netherlands
- International Federation of Workers’ Education Associations (IFWEA), South Africa
- Instituto Sindical de Cooperacion al Desarrollo (ISCOD), Spain
- Instituto Sindacale di Cooperazione allo Sviluppo (ISCOS), Italy
- International Solidarity Foundation (ISF), Finland
- La Liga Española de la Educación y la Cultura Popular (La Liga Española), Spain
- La Ligue de l’Enseignement (La Ligue), France
- Movimiento por la Paz, el Desarme y la Libertad (MPDL), Spain
- Norwegian People's Aid (NPA), Norway
- Olof Palme International Center (OPIC), Sweden
- Solidar Suisse, Switzerland
- Solidarité Laïque, France
- Työväen Sivistysliitto - Worker's Educational Association (TSL), Finland
- Volkshilfe Österreich Bundesverband (VH), Austria
- Workers’ Educational Association (WEA), UK

== Affiliate member organisations ==
As of 2015, there are 24 affiliate member organisations in the SOLIDAR network:

- Asociaţia pentru Dezvoltarea Organizaţiei (Ado Sah Rom), Romania
- Asociácia odborných pracovníkov sociálnych služieb (AOPSS), Slovakia
- Assamblea de Cooperacion por la Paz (ACPP), Spain
- Baltic Platform, comprising:

-Johannes Mihkelsoni Keskus (JMK), Estonia;
-Latvian Trade Union of Education and Science Employees (LIZDA), Latvia;
-Lithuanian Labour Education Society (LLES), Lithuania

- Czech Council on Foreign Relations - Rada Pro Mezinarodni Vztahy (CCFR), Czech Republic
- Coordinamento delle Organizzazioni non governative per la Cooperazione Internazionale alla Sviluppo (COCIS), Italy
- DGB-Bildungswerk (DGB BW), Germany
- Forum Solidarni Dla Postepu, Poland
- Foundation for European Progressive Studies (FEPS), Belgium
- Initiative for Development and Cooperation (IDC), Serbia
- Institute for Social Integration (ISI), Bulgaria
- Instituto de Soldadura e Qualidade (ISQ), Portugal
- Institut für Sozialarbeit und Sozialpädagogik (ISS), Germany
- International Union of Tenants (IUT)
- Narodna Dopomoha (People's Aid), Ukraine
- Pour la Solidarité (PLS), Belgium
- Samaritan International (SAMI)
- Solidarité Socialiste (SolSoc), Belgium
- Solidarité Syndicale (OGBL), Luxembourg
- Solidarity Overseas Service (SOS), Malta
- Union Aid Abroad (APHEDA), Australia
- Volkshilfe Hellas, Greece
