= 2025 Hamburg referendum =

- 2025 Hamburg referendums
- 12 October 2025

Hamburg tests universal basic income
For	37.3%
Against	62.7%

Hamburg future initiative
For	53.2%
Against	46.8%

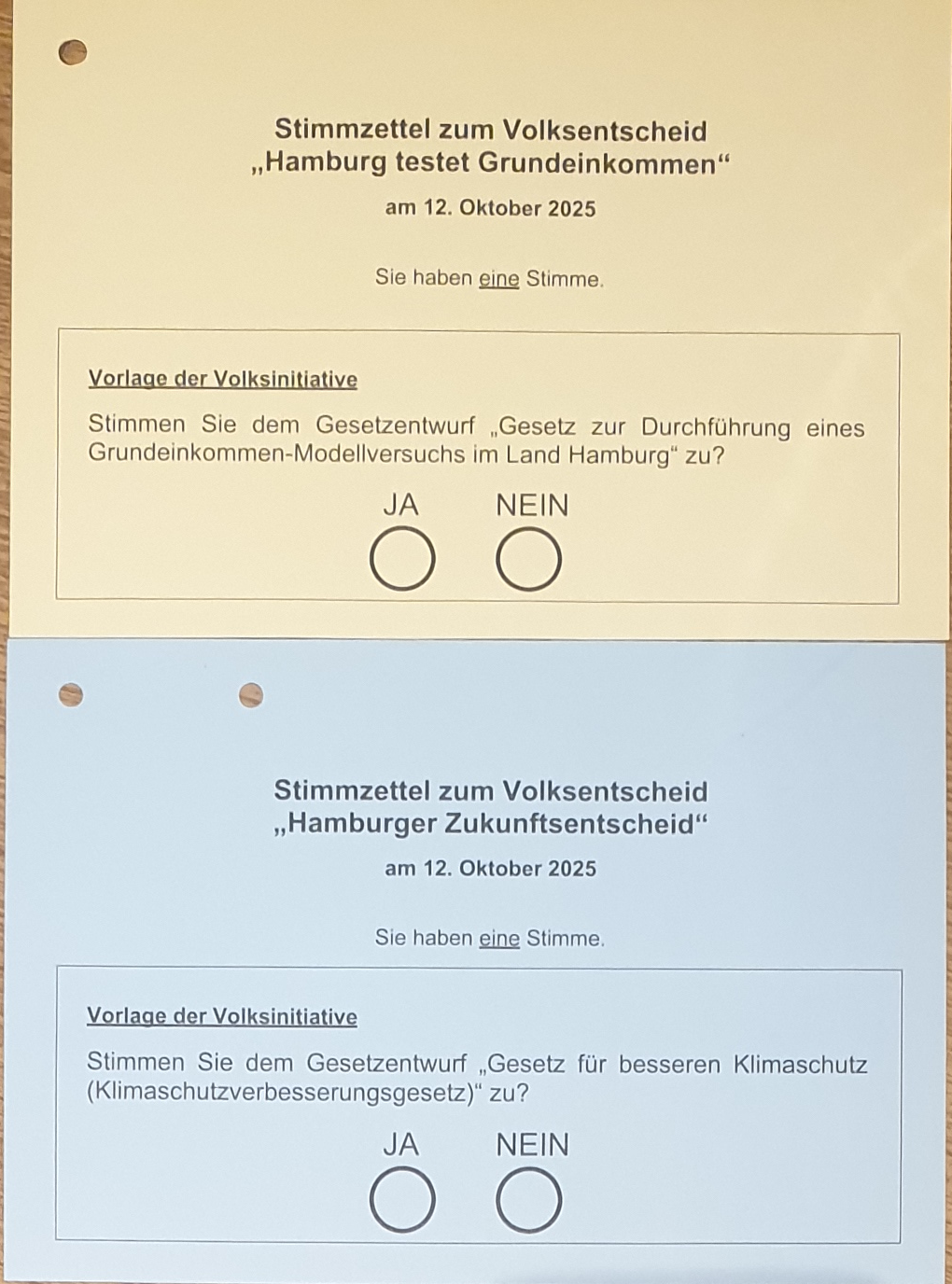
Ballots for the referendums

Two referendums were held on 12 October 2025 in the German city-state of Hamburg. The citizens of Hamburg were able to vote on two proposed laws that were initiated via popular initiative: "Law on the Implementation of a Basic Income Pilot Program in the State of Hamburg" by the initiative Hamburg testet Grundeinkommen (lit. "Hamburg tests universal basic income") and the "Law for better climate protection" (Klimaschutzverbesserungsgesetz) by the initiative Hamburger Zukunftsentscheid (lit. "Hamburg future initiative").

== Background ==
Both initiatives had to collect 10,000 signatures to be presented before the parliament; once the parliament rejected both though inaction, the initiatives had three weeks to gather 66,000 signatures in order to force a referendum; both initiatives did this successfully by collecting more than 100,000 signatures each. They are the first referendums in Hamburg since the 2015 Hamburg Olympics referendum, almost ten years prior.

=== Hamburg testet Grundeinkommen ===
The popular initiative started in 2020 as part of the country-wide Expedition Grundeinkommen network and was quickly able to collect the 10,000 signatures required. The senate (Hamburg's government) sued the initiative before the Constitutional Court of Hamburg, which pointed out some of the issues with the proposal but denied that it was not within Hamburg's power to decide, as the senate had argued. It makes Hamburg the first city and state in Germany where citizen can vote on a universal basic income. The initiative received major donations from the Haleakala-Stiftung with its seat in Bochum, the Eutopia Foundation of Albert Wenger and his wife with its seat in the United States, and the dm-Werner-Stiftung.

=== Hamburger Zukunftsentscheid ===
Founded in 2023, the initiative first started collecting signatures on 3 January 2024, and quickly exceed the target of 10,000 later that same month. After being rejected by the parliament through inaction, the initiative gathered a further 106,374 signatures by October 2024 and requested the referendum to be held on 12 October 2025. Similarly to the other initiative, the Hamburger Zukunftsentscheid also received donations from the Haleakala-Stiftung.

=== Voting ===
Both proposals are required to win at least 20% of the yes vote from Hamburg's voting-age population to be accepted. A notification with mail-in-ballot possibility has been sent to all 1.3 million eligible voters in September 2025.

== Proposals ==
=== Hamburg testet Grundeinkommen ===
The initiative proposed a 3-year trial of a universal basic income (UBI) for 2,000 residents of Hamburg from different parts of the city, independent of income, age, and status. Each of these residents would receive €1,346 from the state in addition to their health insurance. The trial run was to be scientifically observed as assisted. Multiple separate models were to be tested and observed.

=== Hamburger Zukunftsentscheid ===
The initiative's primary focus was making Hamburg climate-neutral by 2040, five years before the incumbent government's plans. It also proposed a widespread adoption of a 30 km/h speed limit in the city, an earlier shutdown of oil and gas heaters, full electrification of transport systems, and yearly CO2 goals.

== Views and endorsements ==
=== Hamburger Zukunftsentscheid ===
Of the parties represented in the Hamburg Parliament, The Left supported the proposal. The Greens, which represented part of the government, were internally split. The Free Democratic Party (FDP), which was not represented in the Hamburg Parliament, opposed the proposal. It was also been opposed by the Hamburg Chamber of Commerce. The Authority for the Environment, Climate, Energy and Agriculture commissioned a study that came to the conclusion that the 2040 goal was highly ambitious. The Hamburg Theatre, Hamburger Kunsthalle, Hamburg tenant association, Education and Science Workers' Union, Fridays for Future Hamburg, and NABU Hamburg voiced their support for the initiative.

== Results ==
Question	For		Against		Invalid votes	%	Total valid votes	Turnout	Outcome	Source
Question	Votes	%	Votes	%	Invalid votes	%	Total valid votes	Turnout	Outcome	Source
Hamburg tests universal basic income	212,680	37.3%	357,619	62.7%	2,840	0.5%	570,299	43.7%	Rejected	
Law for better climate protection	304,063	53.2%	267,299	46.8%	1,832	0.3%	571,362	43.7%	Approved	

Third-party sources reported the turnout as 43.6%, whereas the official final result stated by the City of Hamburg reported the turnout as 43.7%.

== See also ==
- 2015 Hamburg Olympics referendum
- 2025 Hamburg state election
- 2025 German federal election
