= IUT =

IUT may refer to:

- Implementation under test, a term used in technological vulnerability analysis, particularly protocol evaluation
- Institut universitaire de technologie (University Technical Institute) in France
- International Union of Tenants headquartered in Stockholm, Sweden
- Inter-universal Teichmüller theory in number theory
- Isfahan University of Technology in Iran
- Islamic University of Technology in Bangladesh
