= Ines Schmidt =

German politician

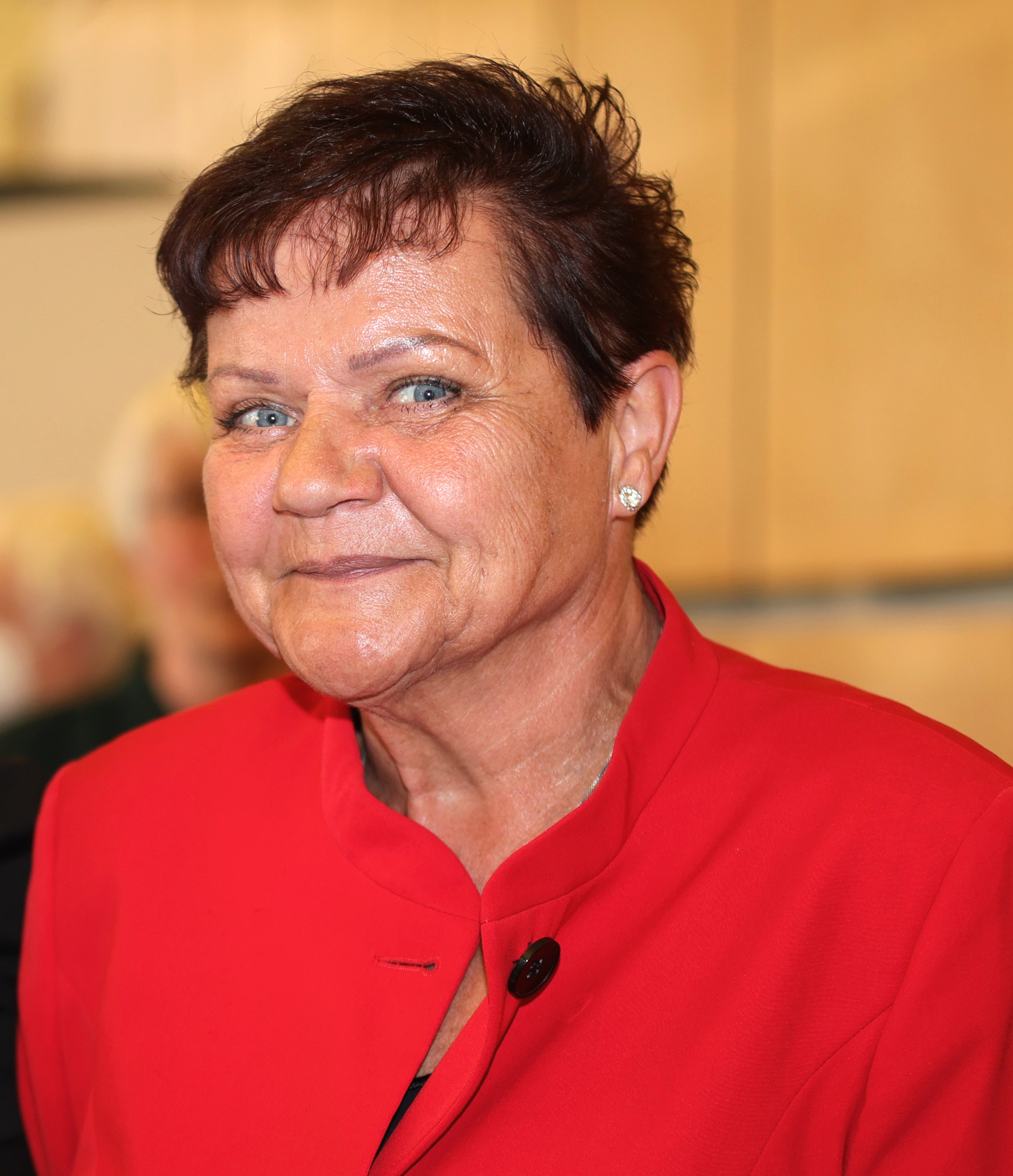
- Ines Schmidt in 2022

Member of the Abgeordnetenhaus of Berlin
- Incumbent
- Assumed office 2016

Personal details
- Born: 19 March 1960 (age 66) Friedrichshain, Berlin, Germany
- Party: Die Linke

Ines Schmidt (born 19 March 1960 in Berlin-Friedrichshain) is a German trade unionist and politician (Die Linke). She has been a member of the Berlin House of Representatives since 2016.

== Education ==
After graduating from Polytechnic Secondary School, Schmidt trained as a seamstress in 1976. In 1994, she entered the public sector and became a tram driver for the Berlin transport authority (BVG). Alongside her work at the BVG, she pursued further education, earning a university entrance qualification in labour law in Frankfurt am Main in 2006 and completing a project management training program in 2014.

== Career ==
=== Trade union engagement ===
In addition to her professional work at BVG, Ines Schmidt was involved in women's representation, first being elected as women's representative in the tram sector in 1996 and as overall women's representative of BVG in 1999.

Successes in women's and equality (Gleichstellung) policy during this period include the women's advancement plan developed jointly with the board in 2003 (and revised in 2016) and the cooperative pilot project initiated by Schmidt with the support of BVG CEO Sigrid Nikutta with the Berlin Mitte Employment Agency, which successfully opened bus driver training to women, particularly benefiting long-term unemployed and single mothers.

Schmidt has been active in trade unions since 2005. She is a member of the transport division of Ver.di, belongs to the Federal Women's Council, and is a deputy member of the trade union council of the service sector union. In 2011 and 2012, she worked as a representative of BVG and ver.di on the European project WISE (Women Employment in Urban Public Transport Sector). The project was launched by the European social partners, the International Union of Public Transport (UITP) and the European Transport Workers' Federation (ETF), within the framework of the European social dialogue and aimed to increase the proportion of women employed in transport professions.

Since 2015, she has represented employee interests as a member of the BVG Supervisory Board. In addition, she has been the BVG's Diversity Officer since 2016.

=== Political career ===
In the 2016 Berlin state election, Schmidt was elected to the Berlin House of Representatives via the state list of the Berlin branch of Die Linke. In her direct candidacy in the Lichtenberg 1 constituency, she received 25.0 percent of the first-preference votes.

After entering the House of Representatives, Ines Schmidt declined to run for re-election as overall women's representative after 17 years and has since been working as a diversity officer at BVG.

During the 18th legislative period, Schmidt served as the spokesperson for women's policy for the Left Party in the House of Representatives. She was a member of the Committee on Health, Care and Equality and the Committee on Economic Affairs, Energy and Public Enterprises.

In the 2021 Berlin state election, she again won a seat via her party's state list. She also retained her seat in the Berlin House of Representatives in the 2023 repeat election.

=== Political positions ===
Ines Schmidt cites the compatibility of work and family life, a safe and violence-free life, equal pay for equal work, and gender parity in management and leadership positions as her main priorities. She also advocates for the creation of more gender-friendly public spaces and support for single parents, especially when returning to work.

== Memberships ==
- Vereinte Dienstleistungsgewerkschaft (verdi)
- Mieterverein
- Europäische Akademie der Arbeit in Frankfurt
- Überparteiliche Fraueninitiative Berlin – Stadt der Frauen e. V. (ÜPFI)

== See also ==
- List of members of the 19th Berlin House of Representatives (2021–2023)
- List of members of the 19th Berlin House of Representatives (2023–2026)
