= Edna Bynoe =

Community activist in Boston, MA

Edna Viola Bynoe
- Born: 5 January 1942
- Died: 29 March 2010 (aged 68)
- Occupation: Community activist

Edna Viola Bynoe (1942 - 2010) was a community activist in Boston, MA.

Bynoe was born in Roxbury and lived in the Orchard Park housing development. Bynoe revitalized the housing development, advocating for a neighborhood park and Orchard Hill Elementary School to built in the surrounding area. Bynoe helped reduce the drug dealing activity in Orchard Park. These developments led to the formation of the Orchard Gardens Community. Bynoe was a board member of the Orchard Park Tenant Association incorporated in 1982. Bynoe also worked at the Massachusetts Department of Transitional Assistance.

Bynoe worked with the Boston Police Department to reduce crime in the Orchard Park/Orchard Gardens community as a member of the tenant association. The tenant association received the MetLife Foundation Community-Police Partnership Award in 2008. Bynoe also received the Lifetime Achievement Award from the NAACP.

In 2011, Orchard Park was renamed the Edna V. Bynoe Playground in her honor. In 2023, she was recognized as one of "Boston’s most admired, beloved, and successful Black Women leaders" by the Black Women Lead project.
