= Carlo Sommaruga =

Swiss politician

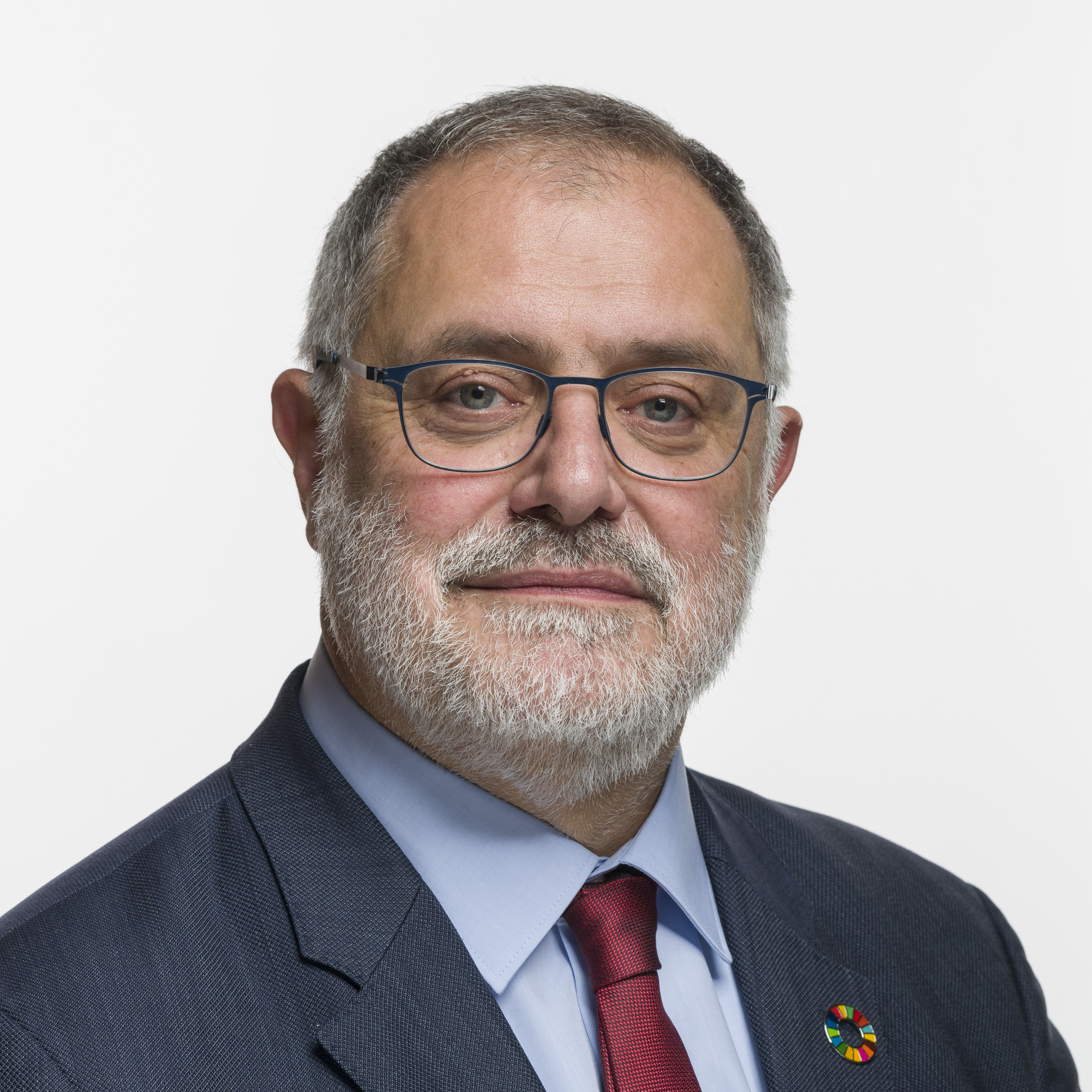

Member of the Council of States of Switzerland
- Incumbent
- Assumed office 2019

Member of the National Council
- In office 2003–2019

Personal details
- Born: Carlo Sommaruga; 8 July 1959 (age 66) Zürich, Switzerland
- Party: Social Democratic Party of Switzerland

Carlo Sommaruga (born 8 July 1959) is a Swiss lawyer and politician of the Social Democratic Party of Switzerland (SP). He has been a National Councilor for over a decade and since 2019 he is a member of the Council of States.

== Early life and education ==
He was born into a family with a political background in Zürich. His father is Cornelio Sommaruga, a former diplomat and president of the International Committee of the Red Cross (ICRC). He grew up in Geneva, where he studied law at the University of Geneva. He obtained his lawyers license in 1989. Subsequently, Sommaruga attended the Graduate Institute of Development Studies in 1984-1985.

== Political career ==
Between 1991 and 2001 he was a member of the municipal council of Thônex and a member of the Grand Council of Geneva from 2001 to 2003. He became a member of the National Council in 2003 and was re-elected until 2019. In November 2019 he was elected into the Council of States representing the SP for the Canton of Geneva.

=== Political positions ===
In 2007 he suggested that members of the Swiss diaspora were to be represented in Parliament, which in 2009 was voted down by the Council of States. Since 2017 Sommaruga was a main force behind a law which would have prohibited nuclear weapons in Switzerland, both signed by the National council and the Counci of States, but on request of the Federal Councilor Ignazio Cassis, the Federal Council refused to sign it.

As a member of the National Council, he was the co-president of the Parliamentarian Group for the relations to the Kurdish people. He was also critical to the Israeli incursion into the Gaza Strip in 2008–2009 and in 2017, he asked in the National Council if a prosecution would be launched against the Israeli politician Tzipi Livni, who visited Switzerland at the time. Besides he is a supporter of the Boycott, Divestment and Sanctions (BDS) movement with other politicians of the SP.

== Professional career ==
He is a lawyer for the tenants' association of Switzerland in Geneva and in November 2016, he was elected their president. Since 2018, he is also the president of the board of directors of the Swiss branch of the European NGO for social justice Solidar.
