= Just cause eviction =

Laws protecting against unreasonable evictions

Just cause eviction, also known as good cause eviction and for cause eviction, describes laws that aim to provide tenants protection from unreasonable evictions, rent hikes, and non-renewal of lease agreements. These laws allow tenants to challenge evictions in court that are not for "legitimate" reasons. Generally, landlords oppose just-cause eviction laws due to concerns over profit, housing stock, and court cases. The opposite of just cause eviction is no fault eviction.

== United States ==
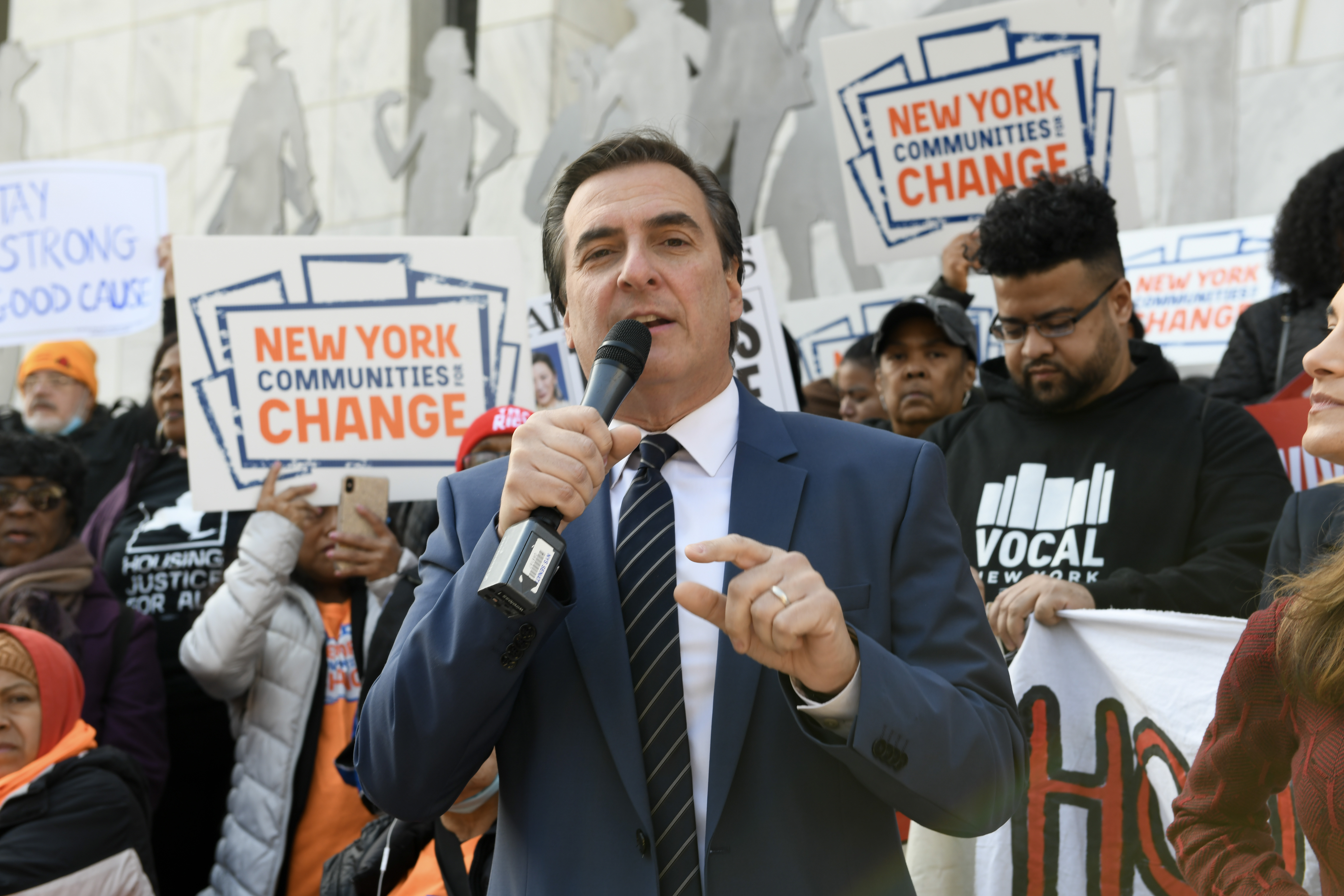
State Sen. Michael Gianaris advocating for Good Cause Eviction Law in Albany, New York, 2023

=== Federal programs ===
Good cause is required for evicting a tenant in the Low Income Housing Tax Credit program, although the definition of what constitutes a "good cause" has fluctuated over time and can be defined by state and local governments.

=== State programs ===
New Jersey passed the Anti-Eviction Act of 1974, becoming the first state to enact a just cause eviction law.

California passed the Tenant Protection Act of 2019 to remedy the state's housing shortage, leading to renewed interest in using just cause eviction laws to counteract the national housing crisis.

New Hampshire passed a bill enumerating valid causes for evicting tenants in 2015, with similar bills passed by Oregon in 2019, Washington in 2021, and Colorado in 2024.

New York State passed the Good Cause Eviction Law of 2024 as part of their annual state budget. It took immediate effect in New York City, with the ability for other cities and municipalities within the state to opt-in. Municipalities that have since opted-in include Albany, Beacon, Binghamton, Catskill, Croton-on-Hudson, Fishkill, Hudson, Ithaca, Kingston, Middletown, Monticello, Newburgh, New Paltz, New Rochelle, Nyack, Pleasant Valley (town), Poughkeepsie (city), Poughkeepsie (town), Rochester, Tarrytown, Troy, and White Plains.

=== Municipal programs ===
Boston passed the Jim Brooks Community Stabilization Act of 2017.

Philadelphia amended its Unfair Rental Practices law in 2018 to add just cause eviction protections.

== United Kingdom ==
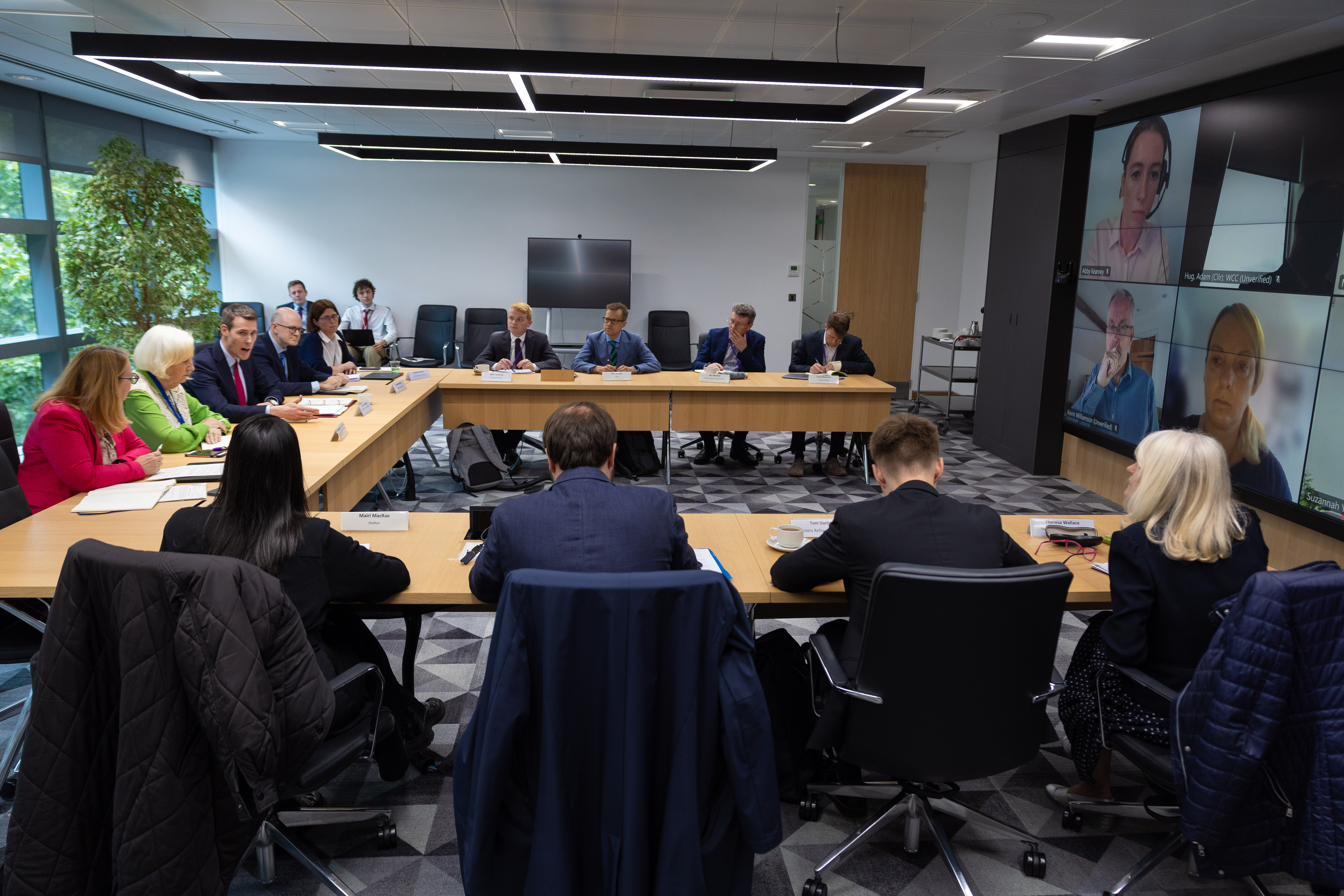
Ministry of Housing, Communities and Local Government discussing the Renters' Rights Bill, 2024

In England and Wales, a Section 21 notice allows landlords to evict tenants with no cause.

The Renters' Reform Bill was proposed in 2023 to ban no cause evictions nationwide, but failed to pass into law.

A revised Renters' Rights Bill was introduced in 2024. The Parliament passed the Renters' Rights Act 2025, which implemented a just-cause eviction system where the UK government provided legal grounds for possession of a property from a tenant.

== See also ==
- Rent regulation
- Tenants union
