= 1925 Tenant Movement =

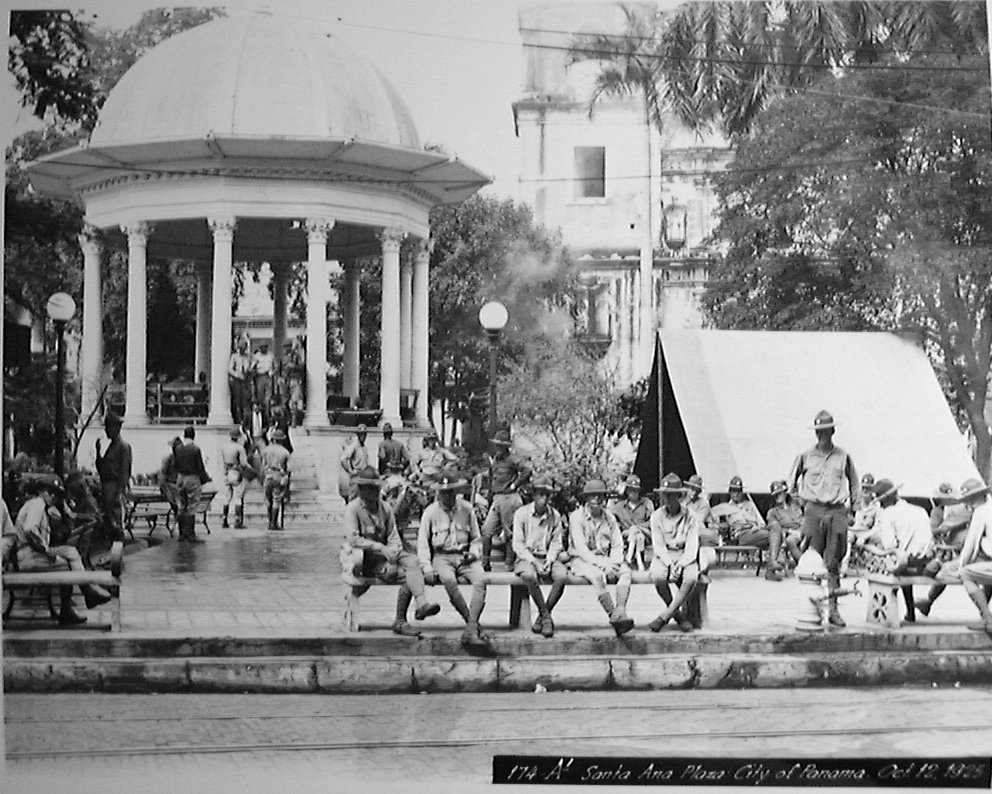
- Soldiers of the 33rd U.S. Infantry in Santa Ana Park, Panama City, 12 October
- Location: Republic of Panama: Panama City; Colón
- Caused by: High cost of rent, rent increases
- Goals: Rent reductions
- Methods: Rent strike, labour strike, protest

Parties
| Liga de Inquilinos y Subsistencia de Panamá | Government of Panama; National Police; Panama Canal Zone; 33rd U.S. Infantry |

The 1925 Tenant Movement (Spanish: Movimiento inquilinario de 1925), also known as the 1925 Tenant Strike (Spanish: Huelga inquilinaria de 1925), was a rent strike, and series of demonstrations in the Republic of Panama. The Tenant Movement was primarily active in the cities of Panama City and Colón, and was organized to achieve rent reductions.

The movement began with the formation of the Liga de Inquilinos y Subistencia ("Tenants' League"), established in June 1925 with the help of the Sindicato General de Trabajadores ("General Workers' Union") with the aim to fight against high and increasing rents. The Tenants' League organized a rent strike which began on 1 October. On the 12 October, the United States intervened to suppress the strikes. Bakers, butchers, chauffeur drivers, and street car drivers undertook work stoppages in support of the rent strike. On 21 October US troops were withdrawn.

The strike resulted in the formation of a Rent Claims Commission, which was intended to mediate disputes between tenants and landlords. Despite this, and as well as the efforts of Panamanian President Rodolfo Chiari, landlords continued to raise rents. Similar conditions would cause a refounded Liga de Inquilinos to organize a rent strike in August 1932.

== History ==
On 11 February 1925, Law No. 29 was enacted, which saw a minor increase in property taxes in Panama. Following the increase, many landlords disproportionately hiked rents. Issues were exacerbated for tenants due to the undersupply in housing stock, as well as the existing housing stock often being small, cramped, and unsanitary.

In June, the Liga de Inquilinos y Subistencia ("Tenants' League") (Note: Various English language sources name the organisation differently Liga de Inquilinos y Subistencia differently. These translations include: Tenants' League; Renters League; League of Tenants; League of Rent Payers) was formed. The League was formed with involvement of the new Sindicato General de Trabajadores ("General Workers' Union"), with the League operating as an autonomous affiliate of the Union. In addition to Panamanian citizens, there were also a number of foreign people—some living in exile—within Panama who were active in the Tenants' League. Some leading members of the League were deported in August, and again in September.

=== Rent Strike ===
The Tenants' League called for a rent strike starting on 1 October in Panama City. On 9 October, the Strike spread to Colón.

The League decided to organize a rally within Santa Ana Plaza at 20:00 on 10 October. Despite having previously allowed demonstrations by the League, City Mayor Mario Galindo forbid the rally. The members of the Tenants' League sent a petition to Mayor Galindo to rescind the order, but he refused. The Tenant League's demonstration went ahead regardless, at which National Police shot strikers, killing four people and wounding at least seven. 28 people were arrested by police. One funeral the next day was attended thousands of people.

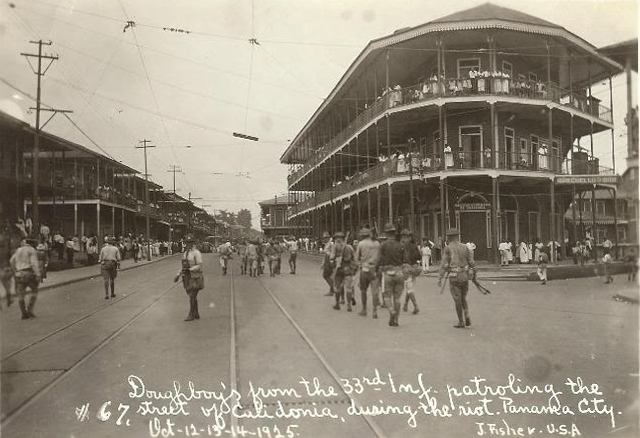
US soldiers patrolling Caledonia Street, Panama City, on 12 October

Early 12 October, the acting Governor of the Panama Canal Zone declared that only danger to American life or property, or the request of the Government of Panama, would result in United States military intervention (under the provision of Article 136 of the 1904 Constitution of Panama the US held the constitutional right to intervene in Panamanian affairs as it saw fit). President Rodolfo Chiari requested the US support in suppressing the strikes, and at 13:30 on 12 October, three battalions of the 33rd U.S. Infantry Regiment crossed from Fort Clayton in the Canal Zone into the Panama, ordered to break apart any gathering of more than five people. At first the request was for US soldiers to support local police, but the resulting US intervention was conditional on being given full authority of command.

The Tenants' League demanded the 150 imprisoned tenants released, and that the police who killed strikers were punished.

Some workers—namely bakers, butchers, chauffeur drivers, and street car drivers—decided to undertake labor strikes for lower rents, with The Workman reporting that a general strike had been declared. The work stoppage by chauffeur drivers and street car drivers heavily disrupted traffic within Panama City. In addition numerous volunteer fireman quit.

In an effort to end the rent strike, a Rent Claims Commission was formed to mediate cases between tenants and landlords, with representatives of both sitting on the commission. The commission first met on 22 October. Despite intention for the commission to meet daily, by 28 October the commission had not met for a second time.

On 21 October, the US State Department decided it would withdraw troops, doing so on 23 October. The US Panama Canal Division Commander William Lassiter had hoped for US occupation to be prolonged so as to pressure President Chiari into conducting mass evictions.

On 27 October, President Chiari met with tenants telling them to produce a list of conditions which would end the strike, however ruling out releasing any arrested tenants. The same day, five imprisoned tenants began a hunger strike.

== Aftermath and legacy ==
The Superior Judge of the Republic ruled that some members of the League were to be tried for crimes against the homeland, and others for resisting authorities. The Superior Judge also exonerated the police of wrongdoing for their killings.

At least 16 people who had immigrated illegally were deported following the strike.

Despite President Rodolfo Chiari efforts to reduce tenants' rents, rents continued to increase and In August 1932 a new Liga de Inquilinos organized another rent strike.

== See also ==
- 2022 Panamanian protests
- 1964 anti-American riots in Panama
- Tenant union
