= Vancouver Tenants Union =

Canadian tenants' rights organization

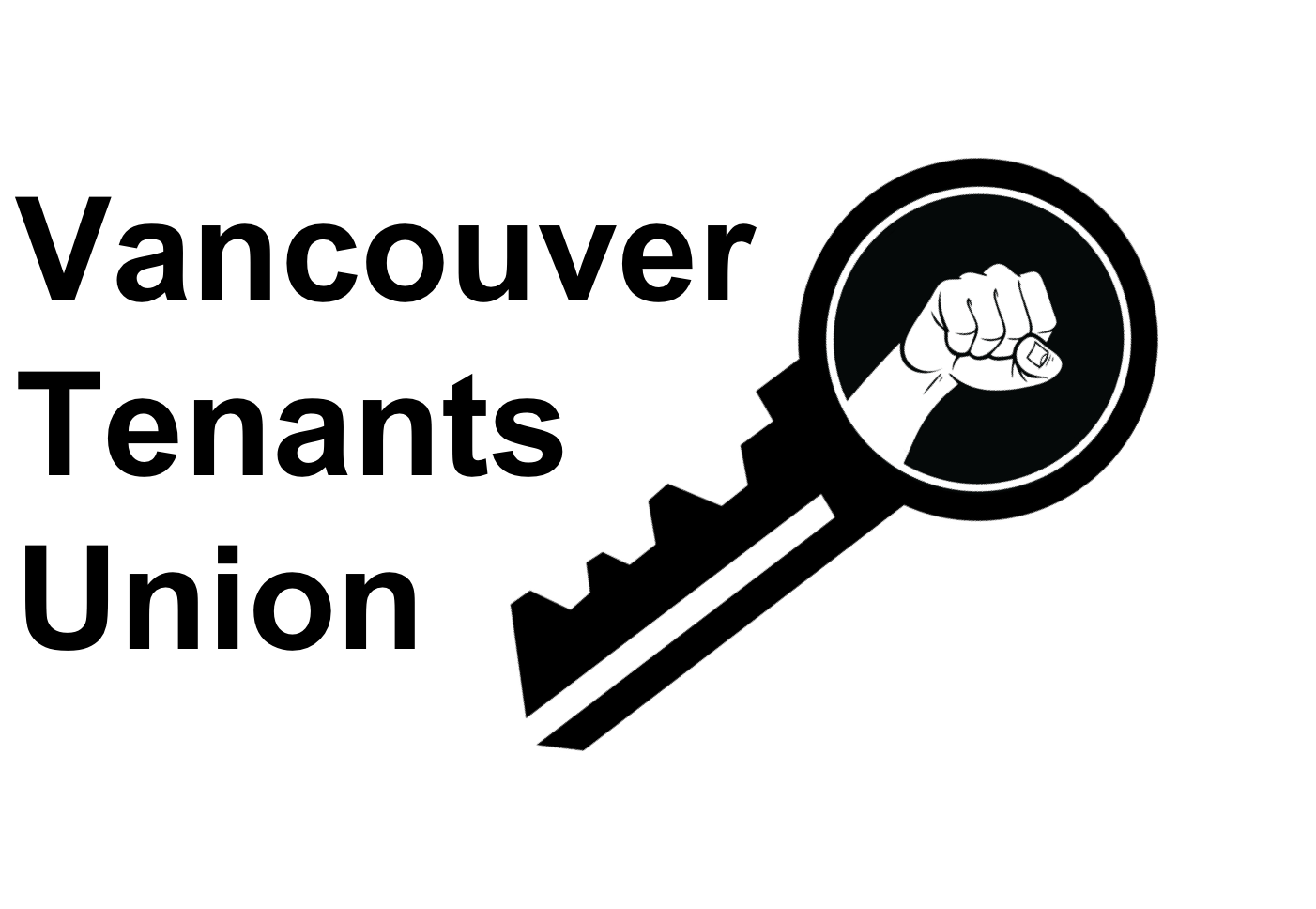
- Abbreviation: VTU
- Headquarters: Unit 216 – 268 Keefer Street; Vancouver, BC; V6A 1X5
- Website: www.vancouvertenantsunion.ca

The Vancouver Tenants Union (VTU) is a tenants union and non-governmental organisation advocating for tenants' rights and interests in British Columbia, Canada. It has sought to build a base of tenants throughout the province since 2017.

== History ==
On September 7, 2018, the government announced that, based on the consumer price index and the formula used for rent increases, the maximum annual allowable rent increase for 2019 would be 4.5 per cent. VTU members and renters attended a standing-room-only general meeting on September 8 to discuss mobilizing against the rent increase.

On September 13, 2019, the VTU held a rally outside the downtown Vancouver office of Landlord BC, a lobby group in favour of the automatic annual increases in rent. As a result of tenants' mobilization and organization throughout British Columbia, which included the efforts of the VTU, the provincial government reduced the maximum allowable rent increase from 4.5% to 2.5%.

In 2022, the union released a report that compiled the results of a survey they conducted with 293 households in 41 purpose-built rental buildings in the Broadway corridor area to demonstrate the large rent gap between the median current rent tenants surveyed were paying, compared to the median market rental price.

In 2023, the VTU participated in a rally at the provincial legislature calling for vacancy control, alongside several other organizations, including the BC General Employees' Union.

In 2025, the VTU spoke out against a provincial law change that shortened the eviction notice period for "landlord use" evictions from 4 months to 3 months.
