= 2015 Hamburg Olympics referendum =

← 2013	29 November 2015	2025 →
- I am in favor of the German Olympic Sports Confederation applying with the Free and Hanseatic City of Hamburg to host the Olympic and Paralympic Games in 2024.

Results
Choice	Votes	%
Yes	314,468	48.37%
No	335,638	51.63%
Valid votes	650,106	99.77%
Invalid or blank votes	1,483	0.23%
Total votes	651,589	100.00%
Registered voters/turnout	1,300,418	50.11%

A referendum on hosting the 2024 Summer Olympics was held in Hamburg and Kiel on 29 November 2015. The proposal was rejected by 51.6% of voters in Hamburg, although it was approved by 66% of voters in Kiel.

== Results ==
=== Hamburg ===
Choice	Votes	%
For	314,468	48.37
Against	335,638	51.63
Total	650,106	100.00
Valid votes	650,106	99.77
Invalid/blank votes	1,483	0.23
Total votes	651,589	100.00
Registered voters/turnout	1,300,418	50.11
Source: Statistics Office
