= Renters (Reform) Bill 2023 =

Proposed UK housing legislation

Renters (Reform) Bill
- Bill
- Parliament of the United Kingdom
- Long title: A Bill to make provision changing the law about rented homes, including provision abolishing fixed term assured tenancies and assured shorthold tenancies; imposing obligations on landlords and others in relation to rented homes and temporary and supported accommodation; and for connected purposes.
- Introduced by: Michael Gove, Secretary of State for Levelling Up, Housing and Communities (Commons)

Status: Not passed

History of passage through Parliament

The Renters (Reform) Bill was a proposed act of the Parliament of the United Kingdom introduced by the Secretary of State for Levelling Up, Housing and Communities, Michael Gove, on 17 May 2023. The legislation proposed to end the no-fault eviction of tenants, as well as making it easier for landlords to evict antisocial tenants.

After the bill's third commons reading, the announcement of the 2024 general election caused the bill to be discontinued during the parliamentary wash-up period. On 11 September 2024, the next government introduced a new Renters' Rights Bill, which received Royal Assent in October 2025.

== Overview of Bill Measures ==
1. Abolish 'no fault' evictions under section 21, shifting to a simplified tenancy structure for increased tenant security and empowerment.
2. Expand possession grounds for landlords, allowing property recovery in various situations, including property sale or relocation of close family, and facilitating repossession in cases of tenant fault.
3. Strengthen protections against backdoor eviction, enabling tenants to appeal excessive rents designed to force eviction, with an independent tribunal determining market rent.
4. Establish a Private Rented Sector Ombudsman for fair and efficient issue resolution, offering an alternative to the court system.
5. Introduce a Privately Rented Property Portal to inform landlords about legal obligations, boost compliance, and provide tenants with information for informed decisions.
6. Grant tenants the right to request a pet, making landlords consider requests and allowing them to require pet insurance for property damage coverage.

== Delays ==
This specific project has been in the government's papers for years. It was delayed due to related projects, such as the digitisation of the UK court system. This bill is seen as divisive amongst the two chambers of Parliament.
