= 1936–1937 Gothenburg rent strike =

- Location: Gothenburg, Sweden
- Goals: Rent reduction; Increased maintenance

Parties
Tenants	Property owners

Lead figures
Claes Bergqvist; Martin Andersson	

The 1936–1937 Gothenburg rent strike, also known as the Olskroken conflict, was a major tenant mobilization by residents of the working-class neighborhood of Olskroken, in eastern Gothenburg. The strike was led by a local tenants union (Swedish: Hyresgästernas centralförsamling), who pushed for lower rents and increased maintenance. After dispute resolution fell through, a standoff ensued, where about 250 families were evicted. The strike ended with a victory for the tenants.

== Strike ==
Claes Bergqvist was chairman of the local tenants union (Swedish: Hyresgästernas centralförsamling) at the time of the strike. Negotiations between the property owner's association (Swedish: Fastighetsägarnas garantiförening) and the tenants union ended without resolution on 21 October 1936. A government-appointed mediation commission was created. By 20 November, evictions were planned or underway in Olskroken, Lunden, and Majorna. At least 250 families were evicted during the course of the strike. In February 1937, the tenants assembly made commemorative stamps picturing the three oldest people evicted during the conflict.

== Aftermath ==
=== Impact ===
In Stad i förvandling (English: City in transformation), architectural history professor Boris Schönbeck wrote that the strike strengthened the position of tenant unions in post-war Sweden.

=== Legacy ===
A street in Olskroken is named after Martin Andersson, a prominent tenants right activist involved in the strike.
