= Mieterverband =

Swiss nonprofit organization

Mieterinnen- und Mieterverband MV
- Founded: 1915
- Purpose: tenancy law related advice, political representation of tenants
- Location(s): Zürich and 26 further cantonal sections
- Region served: Switzerland
- Key people: Carlo Sommaruga (President)
- Affiliations: International Union of Tenants
- Website: Mieterverband (in German)

Mieterverband, meaning the association of the tenants and commonly shortened to MV, is a Swiss nonprofit organization that was founded in 1915 in Zürich. Its full and political correct name is Mieterinnen- und Mieterverband. Important political signals by the Swiss establishment occurred in the 1990s as the tenancy law was introduced, and the association developed into a consumer organization, focussed to support tenants, such as housing and rent terminations. As Switzerland is still a country of tenants of well over 60% of the population, now the goals are to lower rents, demand for more cooperative living room, and to take measures against the housing shortage. On 15 January 2015, the Swiss tenant association celebrated its 100th anniversary.

== History ==
=== Foundation ===
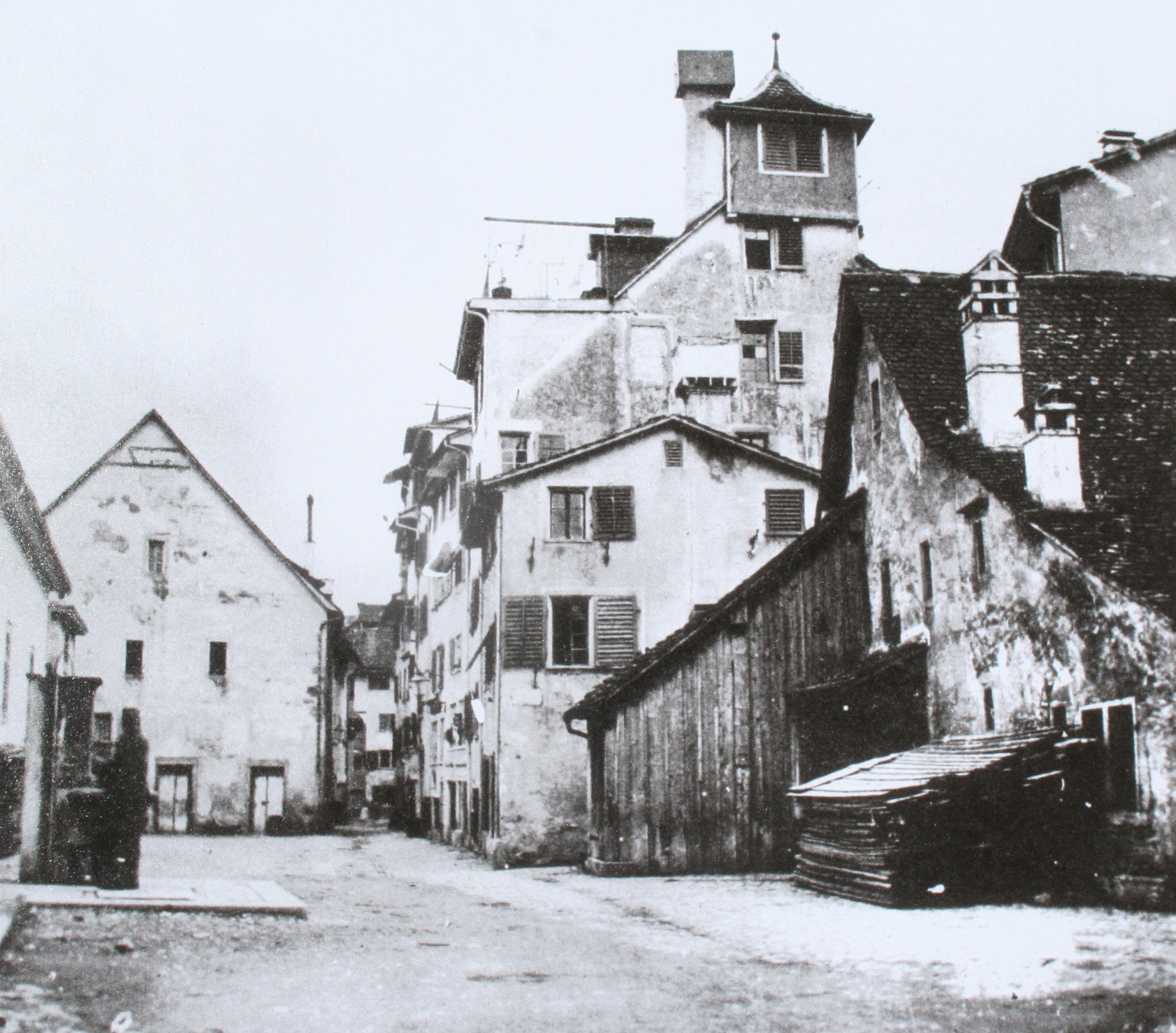
Kratzquartier buildings in Zürich in 1885.

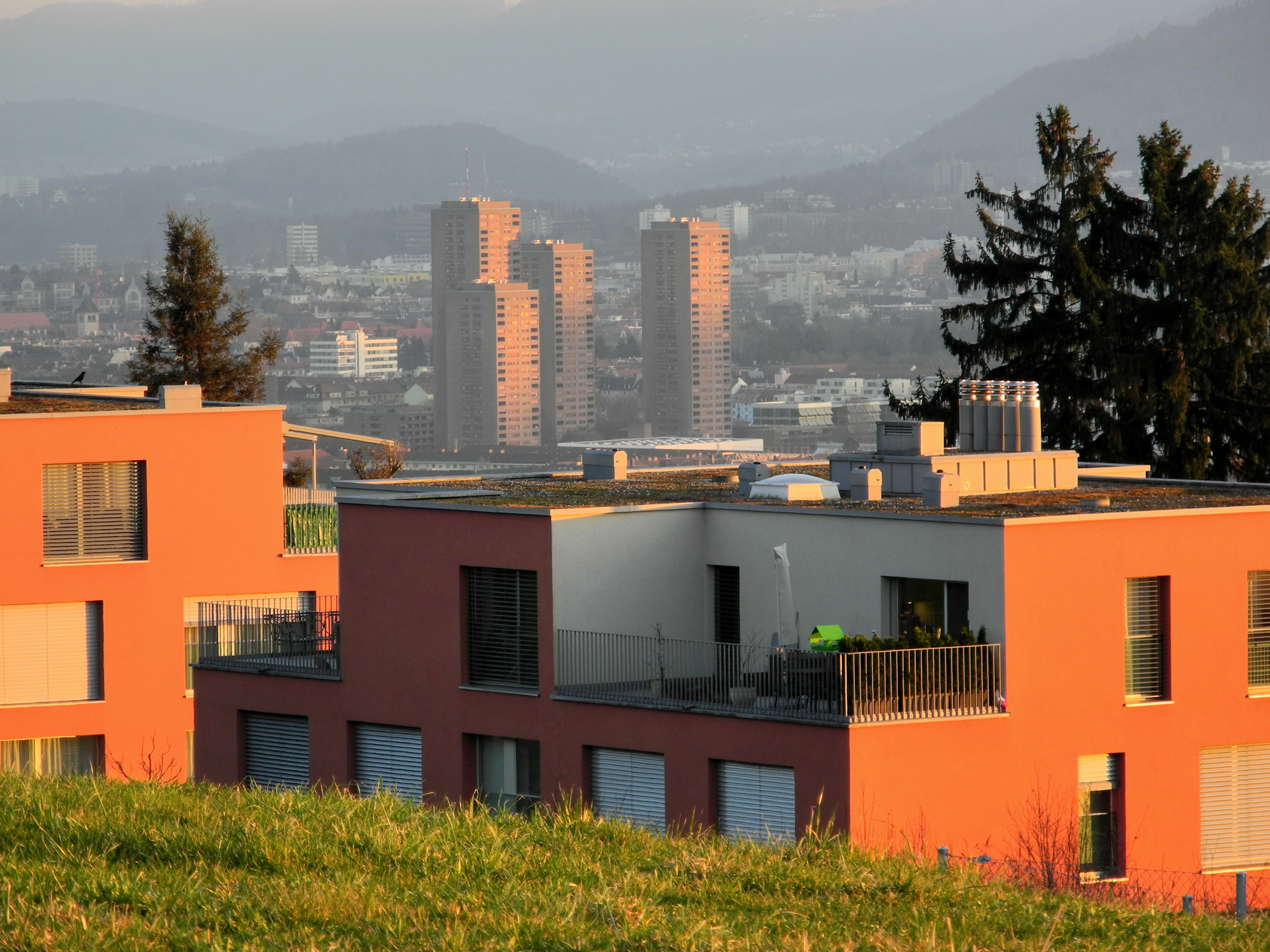
Hardau accommodation high-rise 'silos' of the 1960s in the Limmat Valley in Zürich as seen from Käferberg.

The first tenant organizations in Switzerland were founded in Basel and Zürich due to large housing shortage in 1891. In addition, the foundation was a response to the Swiss homeowners associations that was established at the same time. An important basis of the then tenanant organizations provided the so-called Wohungsenquenten beginning in 1889, which documented the catastrophic living conditions in urban workers' quarters. In 1915 the cantonal tenant association of Geneva called a Swiss tenant congress in Biel/Bienne, where the Swiss tenants association was founded, and its central board was based in Zürich. For the association's activities, the work in the cities and regions of the present 27 sections is still eminent.

=== Later decades ===
Mieterverband as the today's tenant association was established in 1915, as stuffy and crowded housing, hygiene issues and the fight against diseases in the tenements in Basel and Zürich that was then to compare with present days slums, thus the policy measures forced to become mandatory, basing on the cantonal associations that were established before in Basel and Zürich. First formulated objectives were the demands to improve the hygiene significantly. In the early years, these claims were made using a distinct class struggle against the 'class of landlords', but in the following decades political means were postulated much more moderate.

In 1926 Mieterverband was a co-founder of the International League of Tenants, now the International Union of Tenants, of which MV remains a member.

== Goals ==
=== Early days ===
Since the beginning, an effective protection of tenants and tenant-friendly rental law are the central concerns. As concrete goals, the establishment of state and cooperative housing association and cooperatives, the political work against the 'land lords', and the establishment of state conciliation and control bodies. These included in the 1930s to ensure an equitable distribution of costs, such as for public lighting and remediation costs, and of fightloosening attempts by the tenant protection legislation in the 1970s. The tenant association demanded in subsequent years, the Swiss tenants to collective rent reduction requests in response to the mortgage rates in the 1990s.

=== Present days ===
A "right to housing" is still today not integrated in the Swiss Federal Constitution. So in 1970 an initiative was narrowly rejected. Squatting the predominantly non-parliamentary Mietbewegung in the 1980s and 1990s, led to tensions in some sections. The MV tries furthermore by parliamentary initiatives and federal popular initiatives to establish an effective protection of tenants in the Federal Constitution on the political level. It primarily works with unions and progressive parties. So in 1982 filed "Tenant Protection Initiative" in favor of a direct counter-proposal by the Federal Council was withdrawn, which was adopted in 1986. Remarkably enough, only in 1990 a tenancy termination and price protection was introduced. The demand for market rent by the 'historical class enemy', was answered by the popular initiative "Ja zu fairen Mieten" (Yes to fair rents) in 1997, which was rejected in the traditional conservative Switzerland in 2003, as well as a landlord friendly amendment to the Obligationenrecht, the code of obligations laws, by the Swiss voters in 2004. To date, very important is the free legal assistance and legal protection against arbitration authorities and courts.
