= Kirkby Rent Strike =

1972 rent strike in Kirkby, England

The Kirkby Rent Strike was a 14-month-long rent strike initiated by 3,000 tenants in October 1972 in the town of Kirkby, outside Liverpool, against the Housing Finances Act. A group of women on the Tower Hill estate formed a discussion and support group to help themselves and their families through the factory closure crisis. When the Housing Finances Act was passed, causing a £1 rent rise, these women formed an Unfair Rents Action Group along with other Kirkby residents, communists, and socialists and responded by organizing the rent strike. If a member was threatened with eviction, they were given a list of people they could call to get help. On October 1, tenants withheld rent payments in retaliation.

The strike lasted for 14 months, resulting in the strikers being summoned to court and failing to appear. Employees at the BirdsEye Factory on Kirkby Endustrial Estate were suspended for participating in strike marches. 36 of the strikers were then charged with contempt of court and faced the threat of jail. The strike ended in December 1973 when one of the strikers was jailed and a further four were arrested. A vote was held with the majority voting to end the strike.

The strike was the subject of a film, Behind the Rent Strike by documentary film maker, Nick Broomfield.
