= Tenant associations in Germany =

Associations of apartment tenants

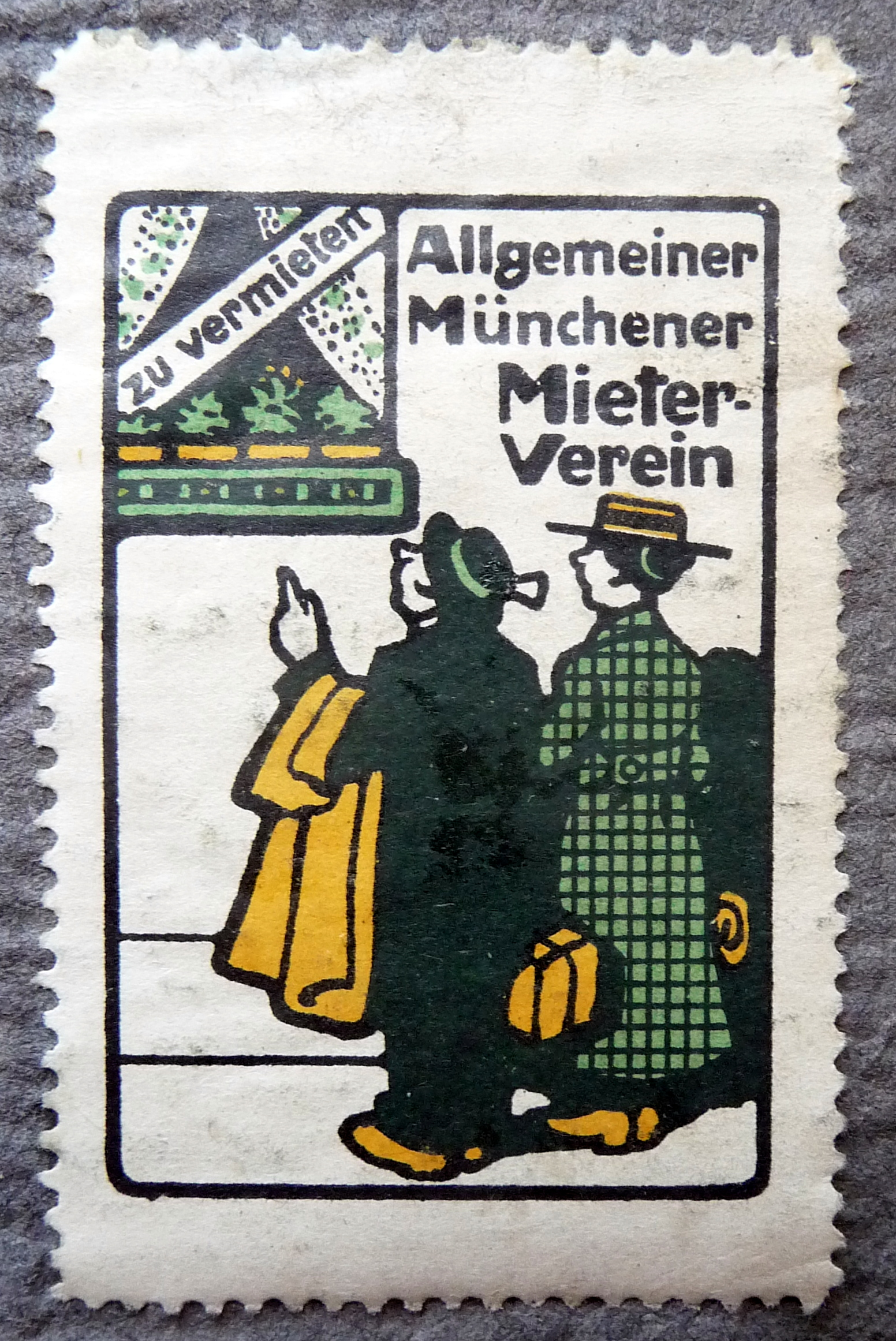
Promotional token, Munich Tenants' Association, c. 1910

Tenant associations are associations of apartment tenants in Germany. They represent tenant interests in a locality like setting rent level. They provide information on tenancy law questions and perform consumer protection tasks.

== Membership ==
The association provides members free advice and cheaper out-of-court representation. Members often have a discount rental dispute insurance option. Tenant's Protection Association membership fees range from 6-50 euros annually.

Many tenants associations join regional associations and the umbrella organization German Tenants' Association (DMB). Over 300 local tenants associations are organized in the DMB. The largest tenants' associations include Berlin founded in 1888 (<190,000 members), Munich (63,000 members), and Hamburg (<80,000 members). The German Tenants' Association was a founding member of the umbrella group Federation of Consumer Organizations in 1953.

== Political role ==
State and federal associations represent the interest of tenants in the legislative process as a lobby group, for example Universal basic income in Germany. Local tenants' associations can bring tenant interests to urban development issues. They are opposed by landlords' associations joined in the Haus & Grund Deutschland.

There are also associations mostly in larger cities that offer legal advice to tenants but have not joined regional associations or participate in politics.

German law recognizes homeowner interests and renters' right to property equally.

== See also ==
- Mietervereinigung Österreichs
- Mieterverband
- International Union of Tenants
