= Tenants' Union of Catalonia =

Organization in Catalonia, Spain since 2017

- Sindicat de Llogateres (Catalan)
- Formation: 12 May 2017; 9 years ago
- Type: Tenants' union
- Location: Catalonia
- Publication: La Llogatera
- Website: Official website

The Tenants' Union of Catalonia (Catalan: Sindicat de Llogateres, literally "Tenants' Union"), formally named Associació del Sindicat de Llogaters i Llogateres, is a tenants union in Catalonia.

The organization was publicly launched in 2017 following meetings initiated in 2016 by Observatori DESC. Its formation involved tenants, housing activists and organizations including the Federation of Neighbourhood Associations of Barcelona (FAVB), La Hidra Cooperativa, 500×20 and the Neighbourhood Assembly for Sustainable Tourism (ABTS). It organizes people living in rented housing, while its statutes also allow other individuals and nonprofit organizations to join, subject to admission requirements.

Its proposals include limits on rents and an expansion of public rental housing. Its activities combine collective advice and negotiations with landlords with demonstrations and campaigns of civil disobedience. Its pressure campaigns have involved disputes with individual landlords, real estate companies and investment funds, and have included organizing escrache protests and occupations of company offices. It has also jointly organized protests at real estate industry events.

In October 2025, it became a founding member of the Confederación de Sindicatos de Inquilinas, a federation of tenants' organizations from different parts of Spain. It publishes La Llogatera.

== History ==
=== Formation ===
In late 2016 representatives of the DESC Observatory, the 500x20 Association, the Federation of Neighborhood Associations of Barcelona, La Hidra Cooperativa, the Neighborhood Assembly for Sustainable Tourism, and Desllogades, started meeting in Barcelona to discuss concerns about rising residential rental prices. The Tenants' Union of Catalonia was established on 12 May 2017.

=== Tenant organising ===
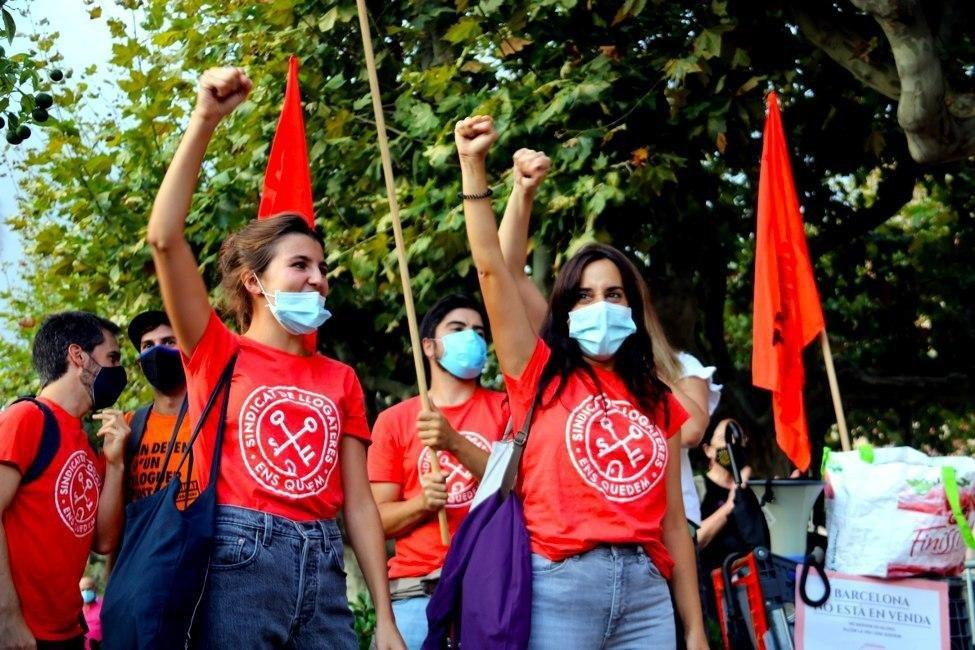
Sindicat de Llogateres members the day when the rent freeze law was passed

In conjunction with other organisations, the Tenants' Union began a rent strike on 1 April 2020 in protest government inaction regarding families unable to pay the rent during the COVID-19 pandemic. The next day, the government announced a package of measures to help tenants, such as suspension of evictions for non-payment for a total of six months and the extension of all tenancy contracts. The union considered the measures to be insufficient to address the scale of the crisis and thus continued the strike. A crowdfunding campaign raised more than 36,000 euros to fund counsel and legal support to the striking families. In 2022 and 2023, along with other organisations, protested against The District real estate fair at the Fira de Barcelona.

In mid 2024, the Tenants' Union pressed for PSC–PSOE and Junts to restrict seasonal and holiday rentals.

In late 2024, the Tenants' Union organised protests in Barcelona against high rent.

== See also ==
- 1931 Barcelona rent strike
- 2008–2014 Spanish real estate crisis
- Plataforma de Afectados por la Hipoteca
