= Olof Palme International Center =

Swedish non-governmental rights organization

- Founded: 1992
- Purpose: Internationalism, Labor rights, Human rights
- Location: General secretariat in Stockholm
- Region served: Global
- Method: Development projects, Party Oriented Support, Knowledge and Debate
- Key people: Secretary-General Anna Sundström; Chairperson of the Board Margot Wallström
- Website: www.palmecenter.se

The Olof Palme International Center is a Swedish non-governmental organization and the Swedish labour movement's cooperative body for international issues. The center's areas of interest include democracy, human rights and peace.

The center is named after the late Swedish Prime Minister Olof Palme. It was established in 1992 by the Swedish Social Democratic Party, the Swedish Trade Union Confederation and the Swedish Cooperative Union. As of 2018, the Palme Center has 27 member organizations within the Swedish labour movement.

The Palme Center works with international development co-operation in the Balkans, Eastern Europe, MENA, Southeast Asia and southern Africa. Most projects are carried out directly by the member organisations, and are partly financed by the Swedish International Development Cooperation Agency (SIDA) through a framework agreement. The Palme Center also work with advocacy and provides information through seminars and reports and organize campaigns concerning international development and international relations. It annually awards the Olof Palme Prize to those who work for human rights.

The board of the Palme Center is chaired by former Swedish Deputy Prime Minister Member of European Parliament Margot Wallström. The Secretary General is Anna Sundström.
