= Tenants union =

Collectively organized housing tenants group

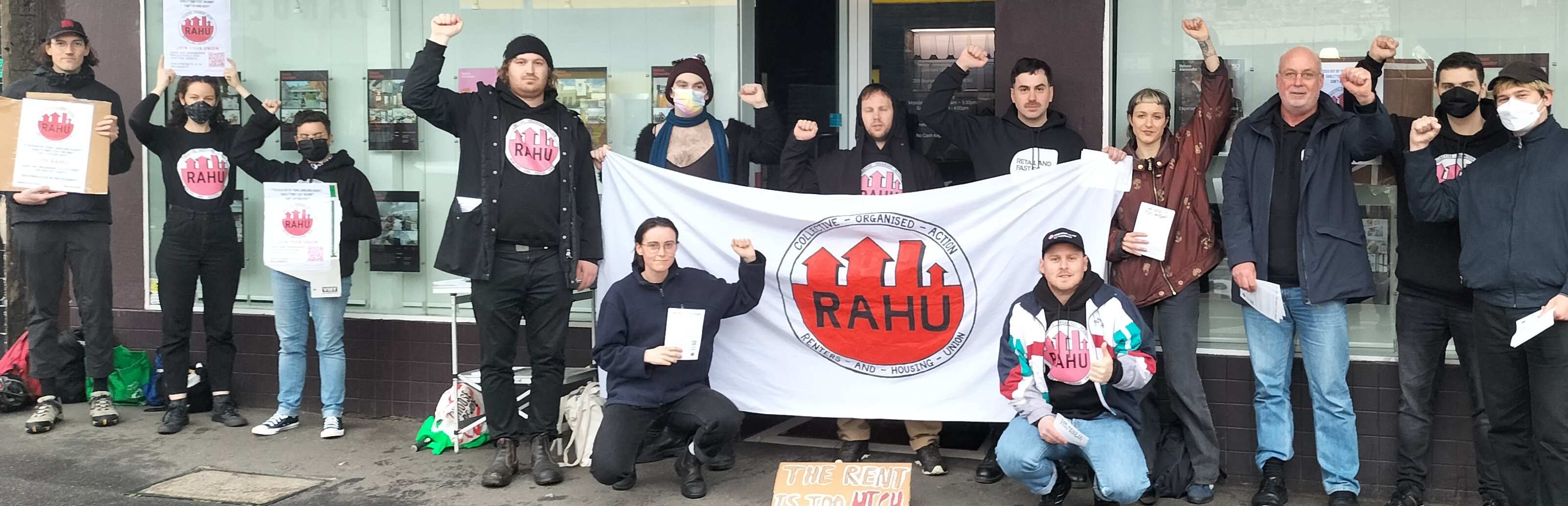
Members of the Renters and Housing Union protesting in front of a real estate agency in Melbourne.

A tenants union, (Note: Also tenant union, tenants' union, or tenant's union.) also known as a renters' union or a tenants association, is an organization where tenants collectively act to improve housing conditions, assert their legal rights, and influence housing policy. Groups may organize at the level of a single building, across an entire city or region, or in national and international federations. Activities range from negotiating with landlords and filing lawsuits to conducting rent strikes and lobbying legislators.

Tenant unions are modeled on trade unions: just as workers collectively bargain with employers, tenants collectively confront landlords, though tenants generally lack the statutory collective-bargaining rights that workers have under labor law in most countries.

== Definitions and history ==
=== Definitions ===
The terms tenants union and tenants association are used interchangeably in popular discourse, but scholars have drawn distinctions. In 1966, Schwartz and Davis defined a tenant union as "an organization of tenants formed to bargain collectively with their landlord for an agreement defining the parties' mutual obligations."

In 2024, Baltz refined this further, distinguishing tenant associations, groups of tenants in a single building who organize against their landlord, from tenant unions, which are membership-based organizations that organize across properties or geographic regions. Under this framework, tenant associations often affiliate with broader tenant unions, which help support their self-organizing. Tenant councils unite residents in different buildings sharing the same landlord.

Tenants join tenant unions and associations due to grievances with the landlord such as high rents and poor building maintenance to seek reduced costs and better quality housing. Tenant unions are modeled on trade unions, collectively joining tenants against landlords. Tenant organizers are individuals who build these organizations. They may be tenants themselves, independent volunteers, or paid staff of tenant unions or coalitions.

=== History ===
==== Origins ====
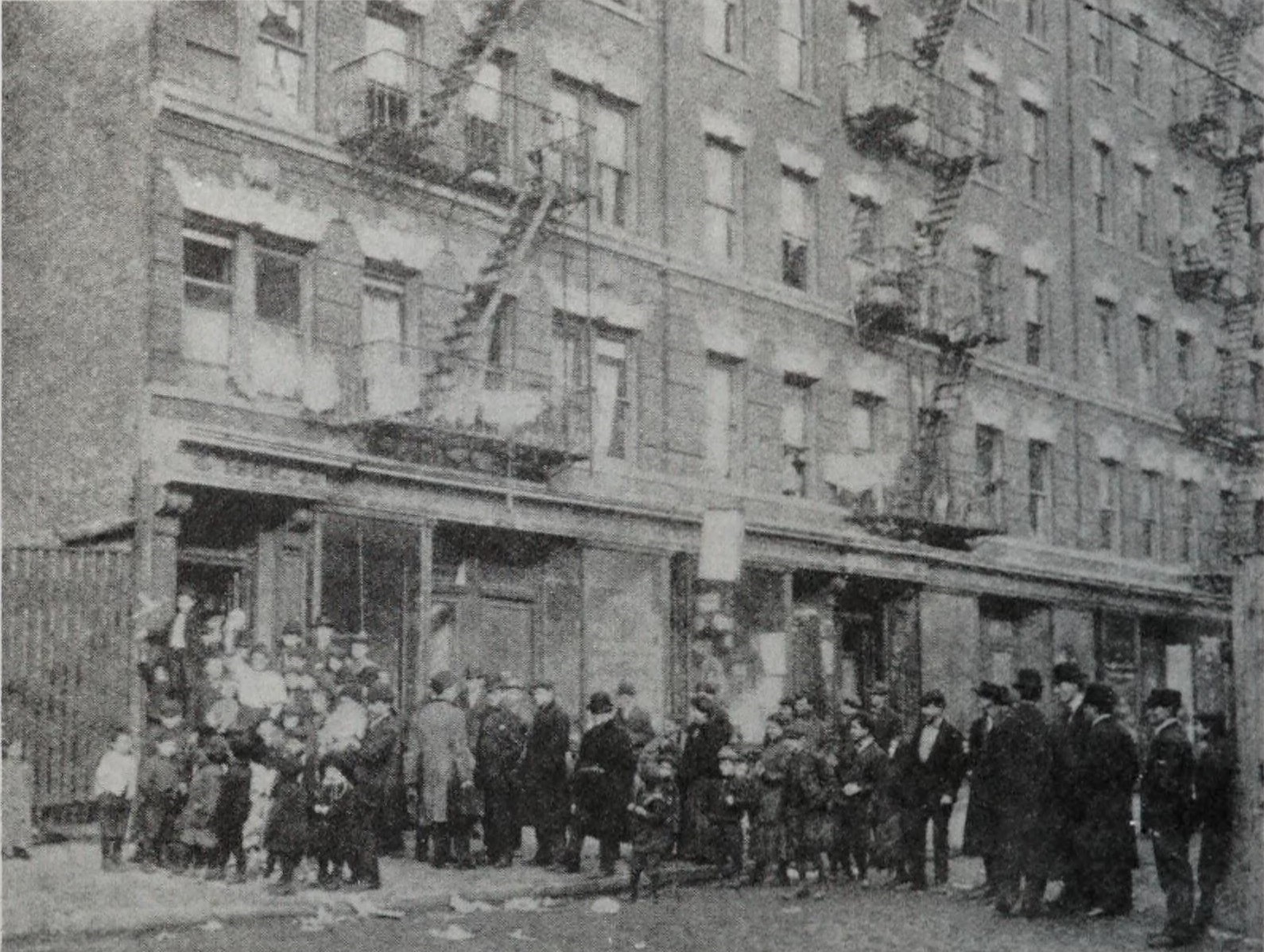
A tenant organizer on the left with her fist raised, addressing a group of tenants outside a Lower East Side building in December 1907

Modern tenant organizing emerged in the late 19th and early 20th centuries alongside rapid urbanization and growing concerns about overcrowded and unsafe housing in industrial cities. Tenants collectively refused to pay rent increases, blocking evictions with rent strikes in several countries. The International Union of Tenants, founded in 1926 in Switzerland, represents one of the earliest attempts at coordinating tenant organizations internationally.

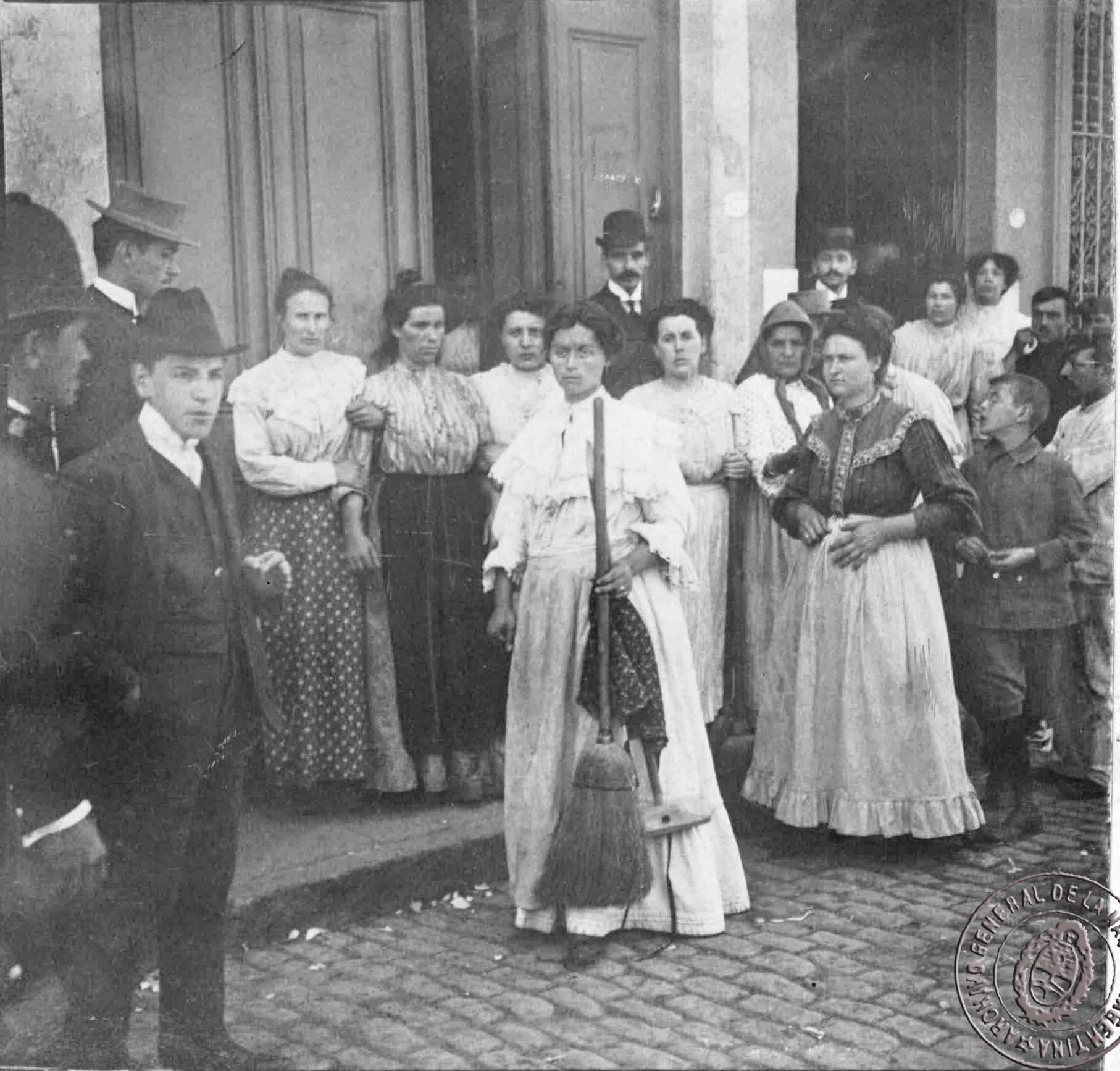
Tenants' strike, Buenos Aires 1907

In Buenos Aires, a dramatic early example unfolded in 1907. Thousands of tenants protested a 47 percent rent increase by refusing to pay. Spreading to 2,000 buildings, the yearlong strike included close to one-tenth the population of Buenos Aires. Women emerged as a significant and visible presence in the Argentine labor movement. Whole families participated in broom parades, a popular symbol of sweeping out corrupt landlords. The action prefigured later tactics and coalition forms tenant movements would develop.

Prince Edward Island, Canada, had the first documented Canadian rent strike in 1864, where the Tenant League of Prince Edward Island committed to withhold rent and resist eviction unless tenants were given the opportunity to buy their land at a fair price. The landlords were largely absentee British nobility who had been gifted the land by the Crown. By the time the government sent in troops to enforce compliance, the league membership was estimated at more than 11,000 members. The league disbanded soon after, though Prince Edward Island passed legislation in 1878 dispossessing absentee landlords.

==== Post-World War II developments ====
The movement gained momentum in the post-World War II era as housing shortages and urban development created new tensions between tenants and landlords. In the United States, the Uniform Residential Landlord and Tenant Act of 1972 provided the earliest legal acknowledgment of tenant unions, stating that landlords may not retaliate against tenants for having "organized or become a member of a tenant’s union or similar organization". In Sweden, the Rent Control Act of 1942 laid the groundwork for rental corporatism that remained until 1978 and left traces in Swedish housing policy long afterwards.

After the mid twentieth century, tenant organizing increasingly intersected with civil rights movements and urban renewal fights. From the 1960s–80s, tenants at the Habitations Jeanne-Mance public housing complex in Montreal had active tenants' committees that organized against evictions, for fairer treatment from management, and for increased tenants' rights city-wide.

== Activities and tactics ==
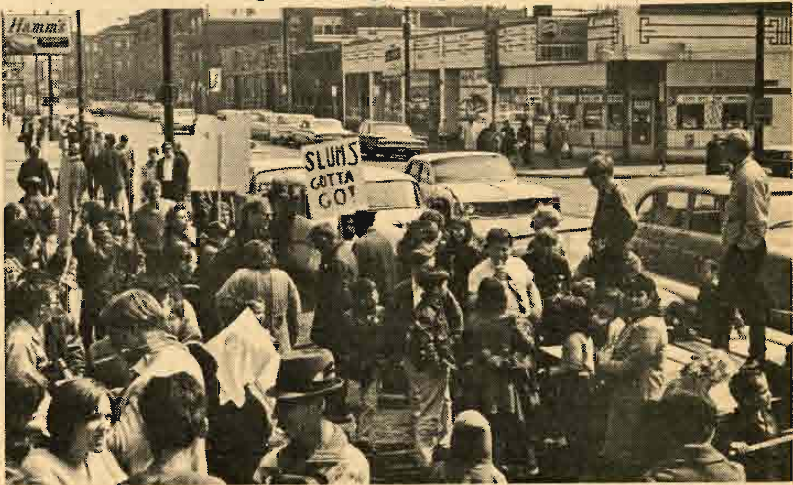
Chicago Tenants Win Rent Strike, Collective Bargaining Agreement

Tenant unions engage in actions to make demands of landlords and legislators. In a rent strike, tenants collectively withhold rent seeking goals such as building maintenance improvements. Creating eviction defense networks helps physically resist people being removed from their homes. This spotlights cases, discouraging evictions and building support for eviction moratoriums or rent cancellation. Tenant unions may help reoccupy housing from which renters have been evicted.

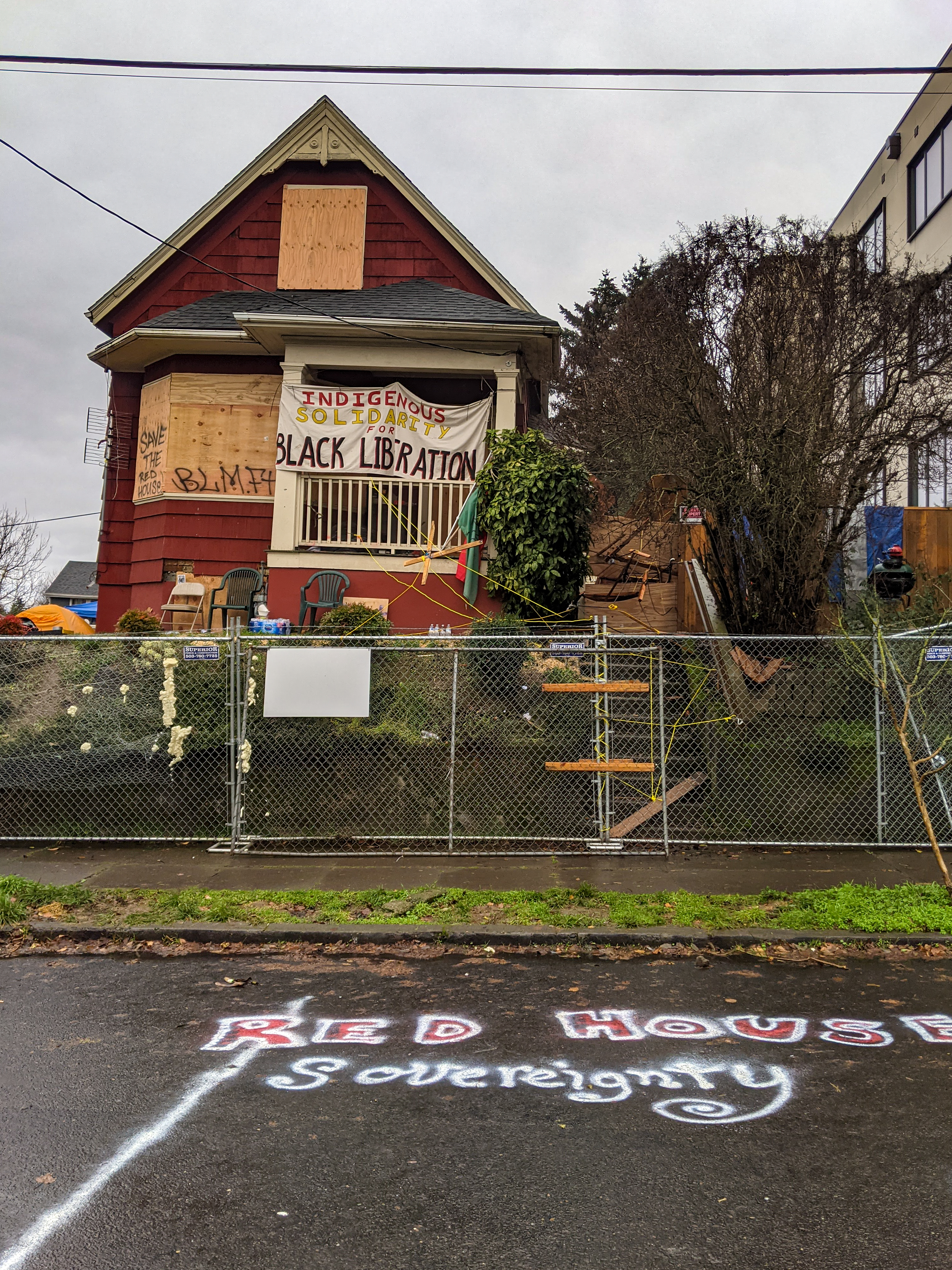
The Red House eviction defense was an occupation protest.

Tenant unions may be subject to laws such as those regarding legal rent strikes and affirmative lawsuits. Tenant unions and associations are generally free to devise their own membership structures, goals, and processes due to the nonexistence of laws regulating their structure or obligations. Tenant unions and associations may register as nonprofits or remain unincorporated.

The legal context shapes the use of tactics. When tenants have a legal right to occupy their apartment they can leverage their occupancy and the law. Conversely, tenants with more limited rights tend to advocate towards governmental actors or engage in squatting or eviction blockades.

== Regional perspectives ==
=== Europe ===
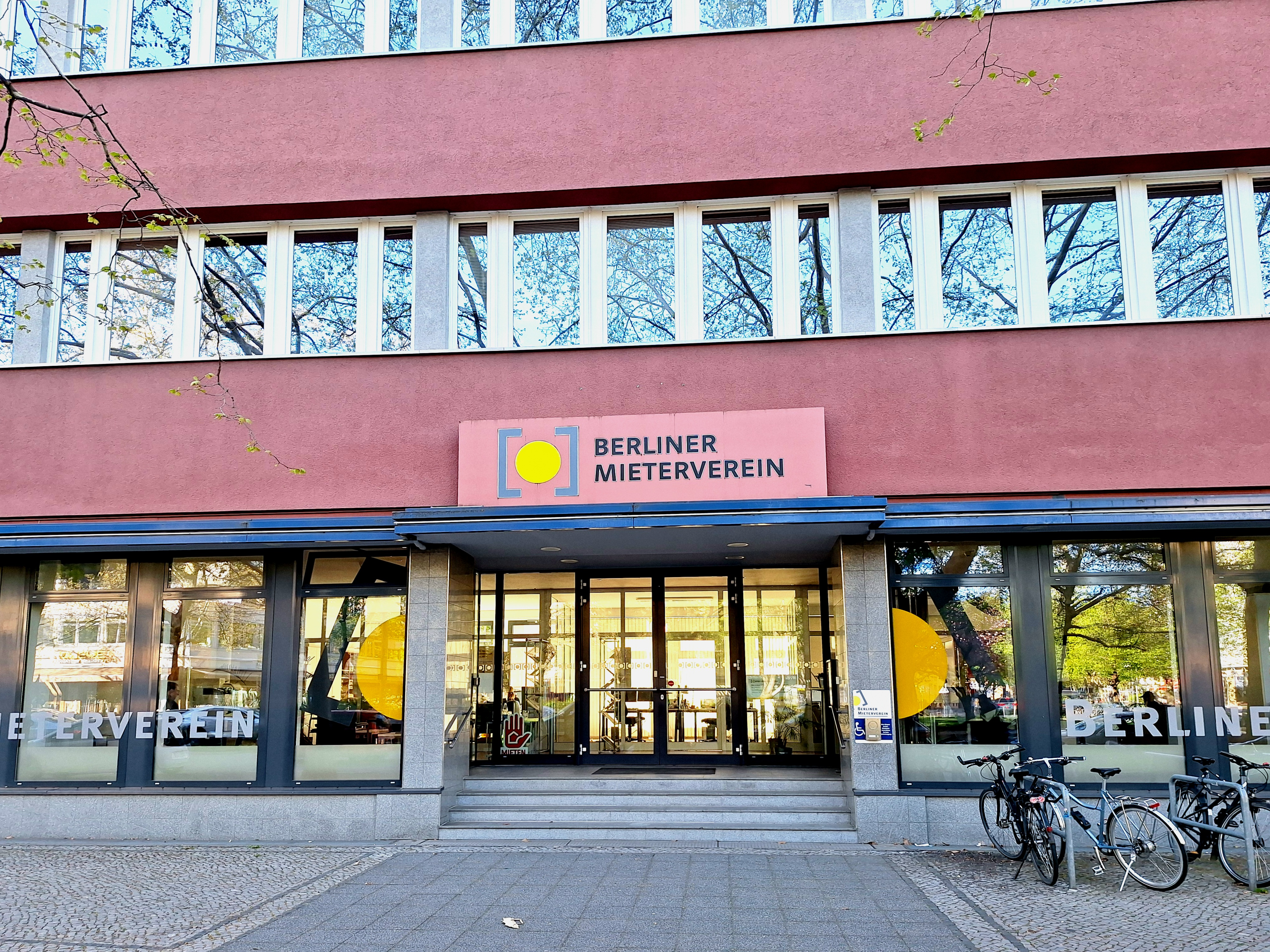
Berlin Tenants' Association

==== Germany ====
In Germany, tenants are strongly protected, with complex legal rules on when a landlord is entitled to raise the rent. Membership in tenant advocacy organizations includes legal advice. Rents are determined in comparison to similar units in the neighborhood.

==== United Kingdom ====
The UK has seen growth in tenant unions, including London Renters Union and the Greater Manchester Tenants Union, which organise tenants across both private and social housing sectors. Additionally, ACORN the Union has been described as a renters' union, as a community union, and as being akin to trade union for tenants. Living Rent are a tenants union in Scotland.

The UK was one of the only countries in Europe that allowed landlords to evict tenants without reason using Section 21 notices until the Renters' Rights Act required a reason starting May 1, 2026.

==== Spain ====
Spain has experienced rapid growth in tenant organizing in recent years, with unions emerging across the country as housing cost burdens have risen.

Under pressure from tenant unions, the Catalan parliament passed rent control legislation in 2020, though the Spanish Constitutional Tribunal struck it down.

==== France ====
Rent contracts are negotiated between landlord and tenant organizations. Tenants who cannot afford negotiated rents receive housing allowances. Tenants are represented in court by consumer associations. Mediation is a first step in addressing substandard housing before the association brings legal action. Tenant associations debated with other stakeholders in the National Housing Council regarding data sharing on energy and housing benefits paid to the private sector.

==== Sweden ====
The Swedish Tenants Union provides a model for tenants' movements. The Swedish Tenants' Association has 528,000 members. The rent-setting system is a social democratic model of sector-based union negotiation. Sweden has the largest share of cooperative housing in Europe at over 20% of all dwellings.

=== North America ===
==== Canada ====
Canada has no national tenancy law; legal protections for renters vary widely by province. British Columbia had a province-wide tenants union from 1968-1975 that sought to secure collective bargaining rights for tenants, but the provincial Law Reform Commission declined in 1973 to recommend extending those rights. Toronto has seen multiple successful rent strikes in recent years. The 2017 Parkdale strike, led by Parkdale Organize, involved over 300 tenants across 12 buildings for three months. The York South-Weston Tenants Union has also led two successful rent strikes in Toronto. The Vancouver Tenants Union, founded in 2017, focuses on preserving affordable housing. The Montreal Autonomous Tenants Union, founded in 2021, uses direct action to pressure landlords and secured building repairs and rent decreases for tenants in three buildings through collective negotiation in 2022. The community organization ACORN has chapters across the country whose work includes tenant organizing and advocacy.

==== United States ====
Tenant unions have existed in the United states for over a century. Section 8 housing in the US require that tenant organizations represent all tenants, regularly meet, and operate democratically and independently of the landlord under federal law.

In the United States, tenant unions in the state of New York have pushed for the passage of just-cause eviction laws following the end of COVID-19 eviction moratoriums. Just-cause could include non-payment, lease violations, nuisance cases, or if a landlord wants to move into the property.

Tenants unions in the US have also helped halt evictions and push for tenant bills of rights and right to counsel in Kansas City, Missouri; Tempe, Arizona; St. Petersburg, Florida; and other cities.

United States of America federal law prohibits housing discrimination based on race, gender, religion and other protected identity categories, but it doesn't explicitly protect tenants' right to organize collectively.

==== Mexico ====
A tenant strike in Veracruz in 1922 brought together a growing crisis of affordable housing availability and anarchist traditions of direct action by labor. After meeting with property owners, Governor Tejeda called Veracruz tenant union members to discuss a new rate basis for rents.

=== Asia-Pacific ===
By 1917 Japan had 173 tenant unions, growing to 4,582 with 365,331 members in 1927. In Korea, from 1920 to the early 1940s, tenant unions engaged in large scale, well-organized disputes with landlords. Early disputes were reformist but in the Great Depression increased in radicalism.

==== Australia ====
In Australia, tenants laws are handled at a state level. Rights of tenants can greatly vary between different states. There is no laws in regards to tenants unions or collectively bargained leases, though the Australian Competition & Consumer Commission has allowed for commercial tenants to collectively bargain.

There are multiple tenants unions in Australia, with them usually being state specific. State specific tenants unions exist in New South Wales, Victoria, Queensland, and Tasmania. The Renters and Housing Union is the only non-state based Tenants Union, with branches in New South Wales, Victoria and Western Australia.

=== Latin America ===
Tenant organizing in Latin America often intersects with broader urban social movements addressing informality, displacement, and housing rights. Countries with significant informal housing sectors have developed distinct approaches to tenant advocacy that address both formal rental markets and informal settlement rights. In Peru, indigenous peasants formed a sharecroppers union. A 1947 law protected sharecroppers from eviction, promised working condition improvement, and mandated written contracts. One policy response to informal land occupations is legalizing squatting through titling. Peru granted 1.5 million titles from 1996 to 2004.

National Tenants Federation unties tenant organizations throughout all Argentine provinces including Organized Tenants (Inquilinos Agrupados) in Buenos Aires. The rent law of 2020 linked price adjustments to average inflation and salary increases. Javier Milei repealed it with an emergency decree that Inquilinos Agrupados has challenged.

== Federations of tenants' unions ==
The International Union of Tenants has some unions as members, such as Living Rent and the Tenants' Union of Catalonia, in addition to non-union tenant advocacy organisations.

In North America, the Autonomous Tenant Union Network was founded in 2018 and has held online and in-person conventions in 2020, 2021, 2022, 2023, and 2024.

The Tenant Union Federation has existed as a federation of five tenants unions across the United States since 2024.

== See also ==
- Affordable housing
- Eviction
- Just cause eviction
- List of rent strikes
- List of tenant unions in the United States
- Rent Is Too Damn High Party
- Rent strike
- List of rent strikes
- Tenant associations in Germany
- Trade union
