= International Union of Tenants =

International confederation of tenants' unions

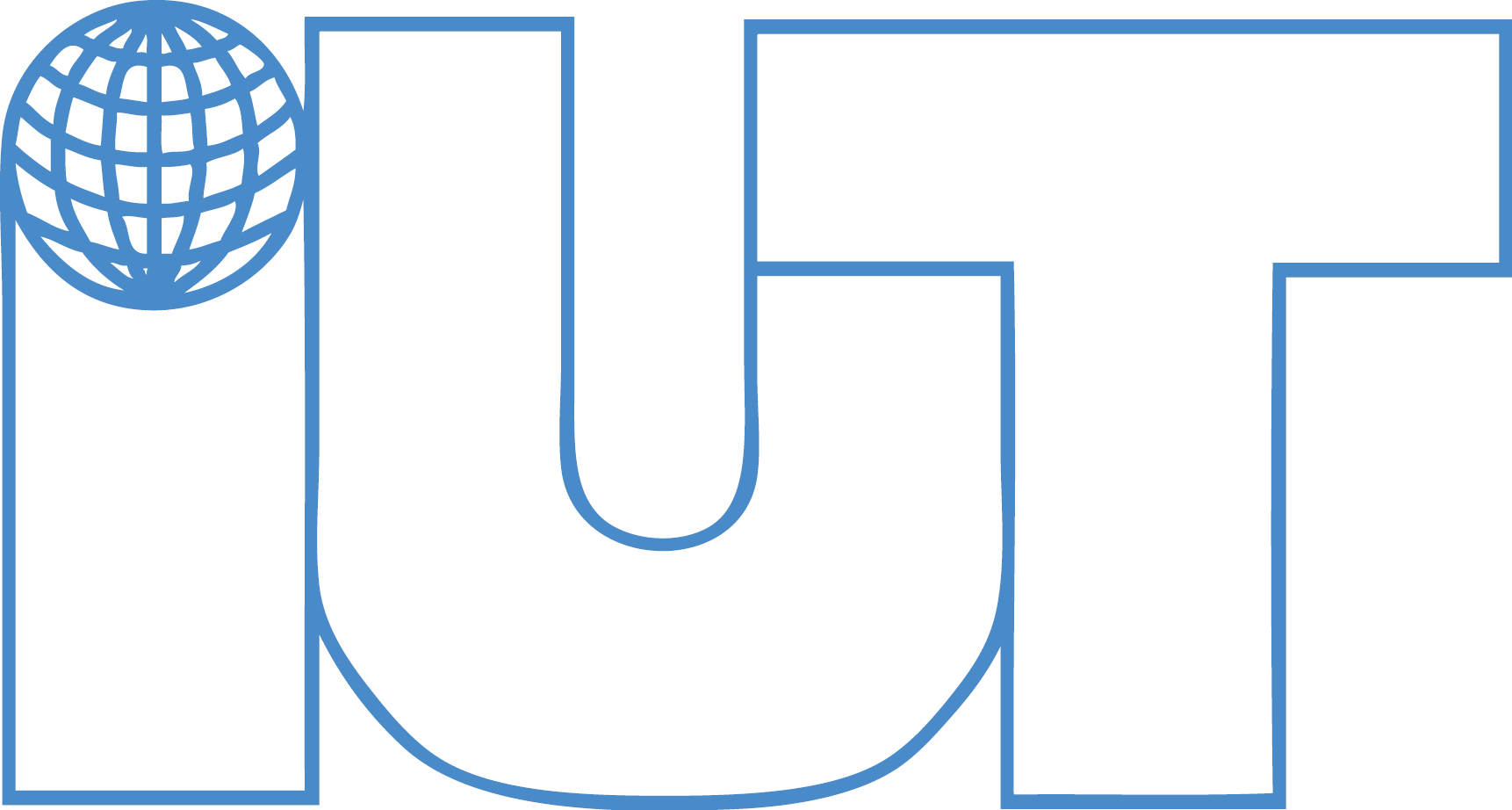
- Abbreviation: IUT
- Formation: 1926 in Zürich, Switzerland
- Headquarters: Stockholm, Sweden
- Members: 74 tenants’ organisations in 51 countries
- Secretary General: Dan Nicander
- President: Marie Linder
- Staff: 2
- Website: iut.nu
- Formerly called: International League of Tenants

The International Union of Tenants (IUT) is a non-governmental organisation representing 74 tenants' organisations in 51 countries advocating for tenants' rights and defending tenants' interests. IUT's stated aims include safeguarding the interests of tenants and the promotion of affordable healthy housing throughout the world. IUT is a non-party political organisation, working along democratic lines.

IUT has consultative status with the UN Economic and Social Council and the Economic Commission for Europe (ECE) - Committee on Human Settlements and since 2005 has participatory status with the Council of Europe.

The Head office of IUT is located in Stockholm, Sweden and Marie Linder, from the Swedish Union of Tenants, has been president since 2019. Vice presidents are Jan Laurier (the Netherlands) and Rolf Gassmann (Germany). The secretary general is Dan Nicander. IUT runs a liaison office in the European Union in Brussels, where Barbra Steenbergen is the head. IUT holds an international conference once every three years.

== History ==
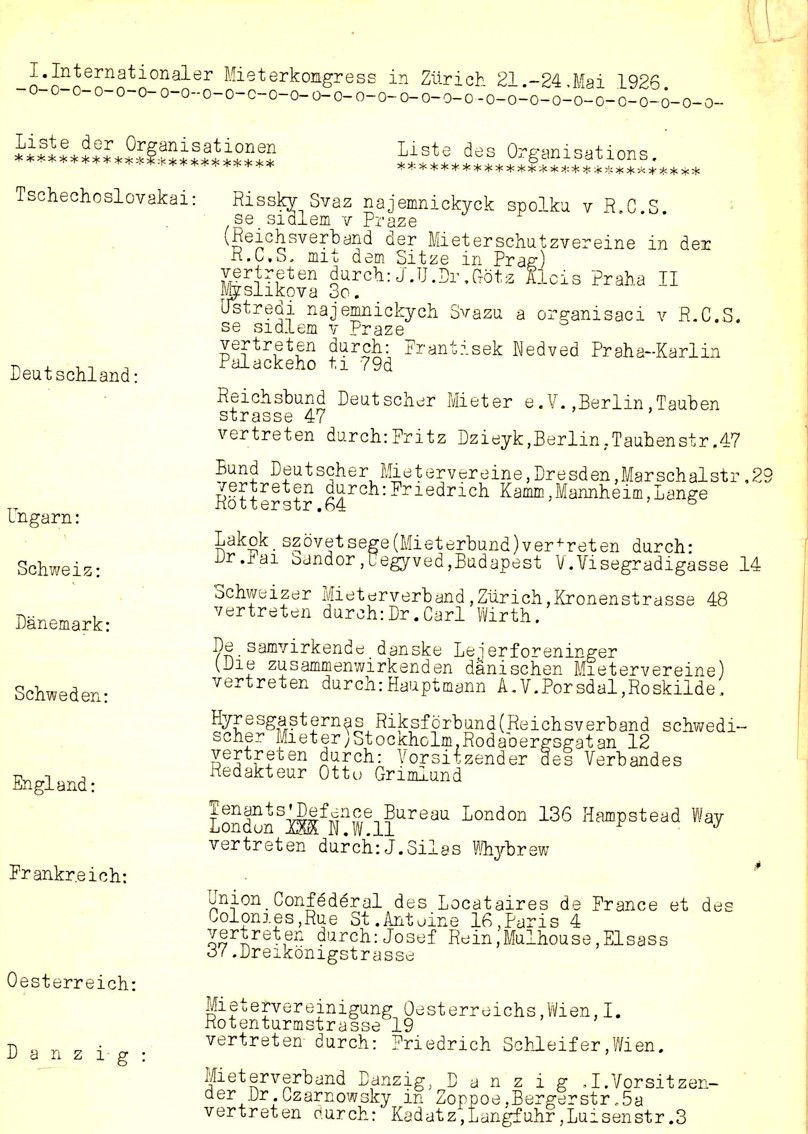
International Union of Tenants (IUT) - Founding organisations

The International League of Tenants was founded in May 1926 in Zürich, Switzerland as the International League of Tenants at the first international tenant congress in Zürich, Switzerland, on the initiative of tenants' unions in Sweden, Germany, Austria and Switzerland. The founding congress also included unions from Czechoslovakia, Danzig, Hungary, Denmark, the UK, and France.

Following the election of Adolf Hitler in 1933 tensions within the League escalated, with the outbreak of WWII the organisation ceased to operate. The League was re-established in 1955 and began being referred to as the International Union of Tenants (IUT).

In 1974 IUT adopted a Tenants' Charter as their primary policy document, which was superseded in 2004 by a new Tenants' Charter. The charter includes stated objectives such as security of tenure, affordability, housing quality, democratic tenant participation in housing, and the right for tenants to organise to defend their interests.

In 1986 IUT established the annual International Tenants' Day to coincide with the United Nations initiated World Habitat Day, taking place each year on the first Monday in October.

== See also ==
- List of tenant union federations
