= Portland Tenants United =

American nonprofit organization for renters

Portland Tenants Union
- Founded: 2015
- Headquarters: Portland, Oregon
- Location: United States
- Key people: Margot Black
- Website: www.pdxtu.org

Portland Tenants United (PTU) is a tenants union in Portland, Oregon founded in 2015 by Margot Black with the initial purpose to stabilize rents, end no fault evictions, and to enable rent strikes. The group organizes apartments into tenants unions and advocates for renter-friendly local ordinances.

== History ==
PTU has advocated for a Tenants Bill of Rights that would include requiring six months' notice before raising rents, preventing the eviction of educators and children during the academic year, and a tenant right to counsel program.

The group also has called for the city of Portland to enforce its ban on short-term rentals.

In 2024, PTU helped organize The Russell Apartments over alleged maintenance issues, misleading amenities, and high utility costs. That September, the Russell Apartments Tenant Union hosted a forum for candidates for the city council election and invited the candidates who had signed onto a pledge to support a Tenant Bill of Rights.

== See also ==
- Housing in the United States
- List of tenant unions in the United States
- Tenant Union Federation
