= KC Tenants =

Housing rights organization in Missouri

- Kansas City Tenants
- Founded: 2019
- Headquarters: Kansas City, Missouri
- Location: United States
- Members: 10,000+ (2024)
- Key people: Tiana Caldwell, Diane Charity, Brandy Granados, and Tara Raghuveer (co-founders)
- Affiliations: Tenant Union Federation
- Website: kctenants.org/home

KC Tenants is a left-wing non-profit tenant's union in Kansas City, Missouri. It was founded in 2019 by Tiana Caldwell, Tara Raghuveer, Brandy Granados, and Diane Charity.

== History ==
KC Tenants was founded with an annual budget of $30,000, which has grown to almost $600,000 in June 2023. The union has worked together with Mayor Quinton Lucas on housing policy, notably passing a tenant's bill of rights in 2019 that included banning "discrimination against prospective tenants solely because of a prior arrest, conviction or eviction." KC Tenants has clashed with landlords and the courts over specific eviction cases and the COVID eviction moratorium. The group has a tenants' hotline and an incident report form for renters experiencing housing issues or who have questions about renters' rights.

The organization pressured the city into passing a tenants right to counsel policy, which provides free legal counseling for renters facing eviction filings. In January 2024, Kansas City City Council passed a source of income discrimination ban advocated by KC Tenants. The group also advocated for a "People's Housing Trust Fund" to build affordable housing, originally to be funded through reducing the Kansas City police department budget.

The Kansas City Homeless Union formed in January 2021 with support from KC Tenants. The two groups have demonstrated together for housing policy reform.

=== KC Tenants Power ===
KC Tenants launched its political wing in October 2022 named KC Tenants Power.

In June 2023, four of the six candidates endorsed by KC Tenants Power won election to the Kansas City Council. The winners included Johnathan Duncan, a KC Tenants leader, who defeated Dan Tarwater in the 6th District.

=== Founding of Tenant Union Federation ===
In August 2024, KC Tenants, Connecticut Tenant Union, Louisville Tenant Union, Bozeman Tenants United, and Not Me We founded the Tenant Union Federation. The federation describes its goals as: "use the collective power of its locals to negotiate better living conditions for renters, slow the commodification of housing, help establish alternatives to the predominant market-based solution to housing, guarantee housing as a public utility, and create economic and political power for its renters." The federation's first campaign hopes to cap rent on housing managed by the federal government.

== Campaigns ==
=== Stadium sales tax ===
In 2024, KC Tenants opposed raising sales taxes to fund a new Kansas City Royals Stadium. The group stated in their mailers, "Don’t let the team owners threaten us for our tax dollars" in response to the possibility of the Royals or the Chiefs leaving the city if the sales tax failed. The group argued the tax would have transferred $2 billion in public funds to private corporations. Despite being outspent, the stadium sales tax referendum failed.

=== We Feed Us ===
During the 2025 United States federal government shutdown, KC Tenants organized a mutual aid food bank program. The group provided food to over 2,500 union members during the campaign using local food, including $50,000 worth of produce from local farmers. The campaign ended in November 2025 with the end of the federal shutdown.

== Rent strikes ==
=== 2024 ===
==== Independence Towers and Quality Hill Towers ====
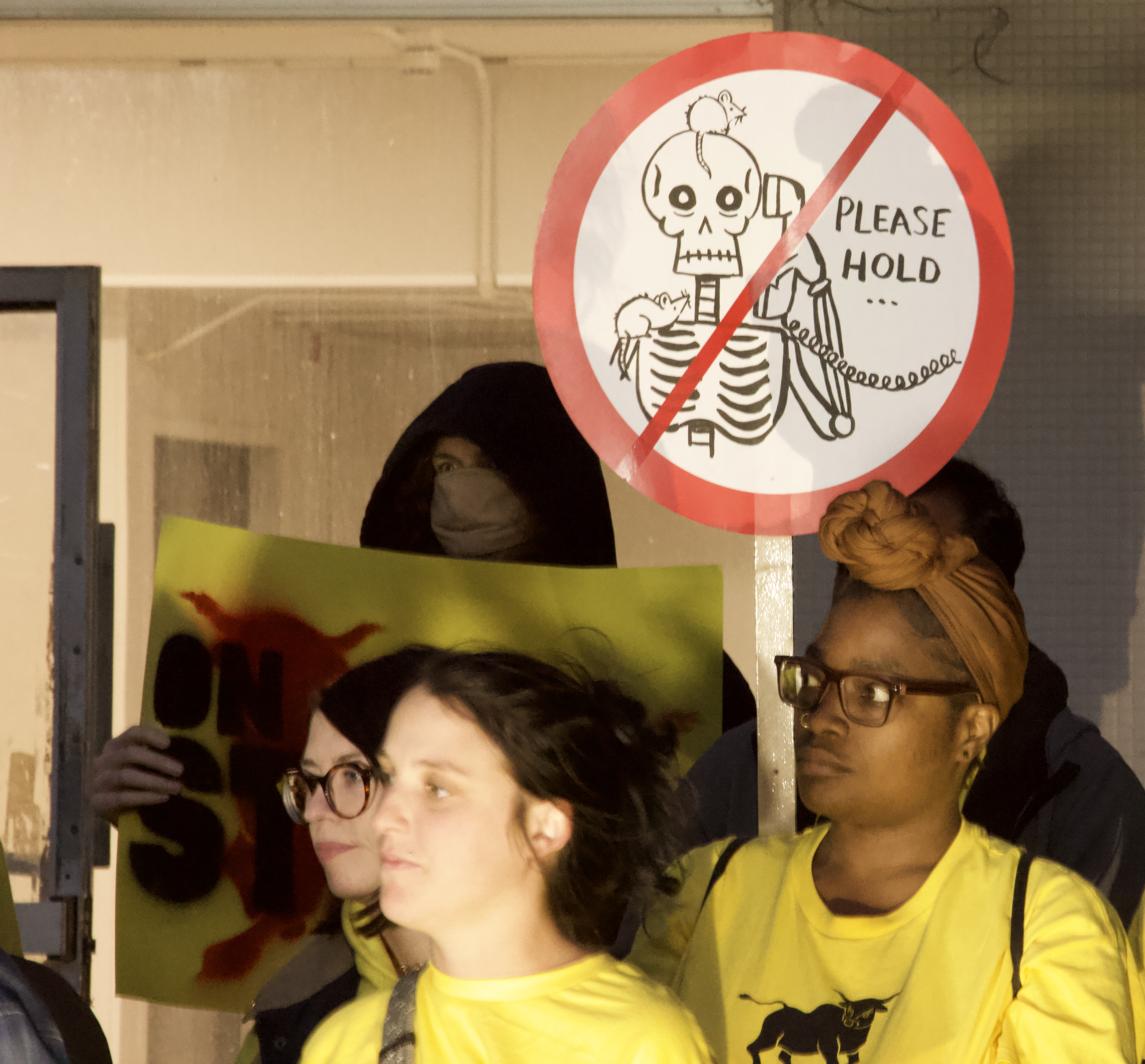
KC Tenants members on strike at Independence Towers in Independence, Missouri

On Friday, September 27, 2024, KC Tenants announced rent strikes at Independence Towers and Quality Hill Towers beginning October 1. Union members demanded collectively bargained lease agreements, new ownership of the apartment complexes, and a federal rent cap. The strikes focused on the properties' landlords, as well as the Federal Housing Finance Authority (FHFA) and Fannie Mae. Tenants were expected to withhold $60,000 of rent in the first month of the strike between the two complexes. As of October 1, 65% of Independence Towers residents had joined the rent strike. Kansas City congressman Emmanuel Cleaver said in September 2024 he would support a rent strike at Independence Towers. In June 2025, the striking tenants won their strike.

=== 2025 ===
==== Bowen Towers ====
On Wednesday, October 1, 2025, Bowen Tower Tenants Union members affiliated with KC Tenants announced a rent strike. Union members demanded fixes to alleged maintenance issues, such as bedbug infestations, AC summer outages, and broken appliances. The strike is ongoing.

The Bowen Tower management company, Lynd Management, claimed to have spent $214,951.73 on repairs and said they are continuing to improve conditions.

Kansas City mayor Quinton Lucas called for landlords to meet with tenants and "give them the type of housing that you and your family would want for yourselves."

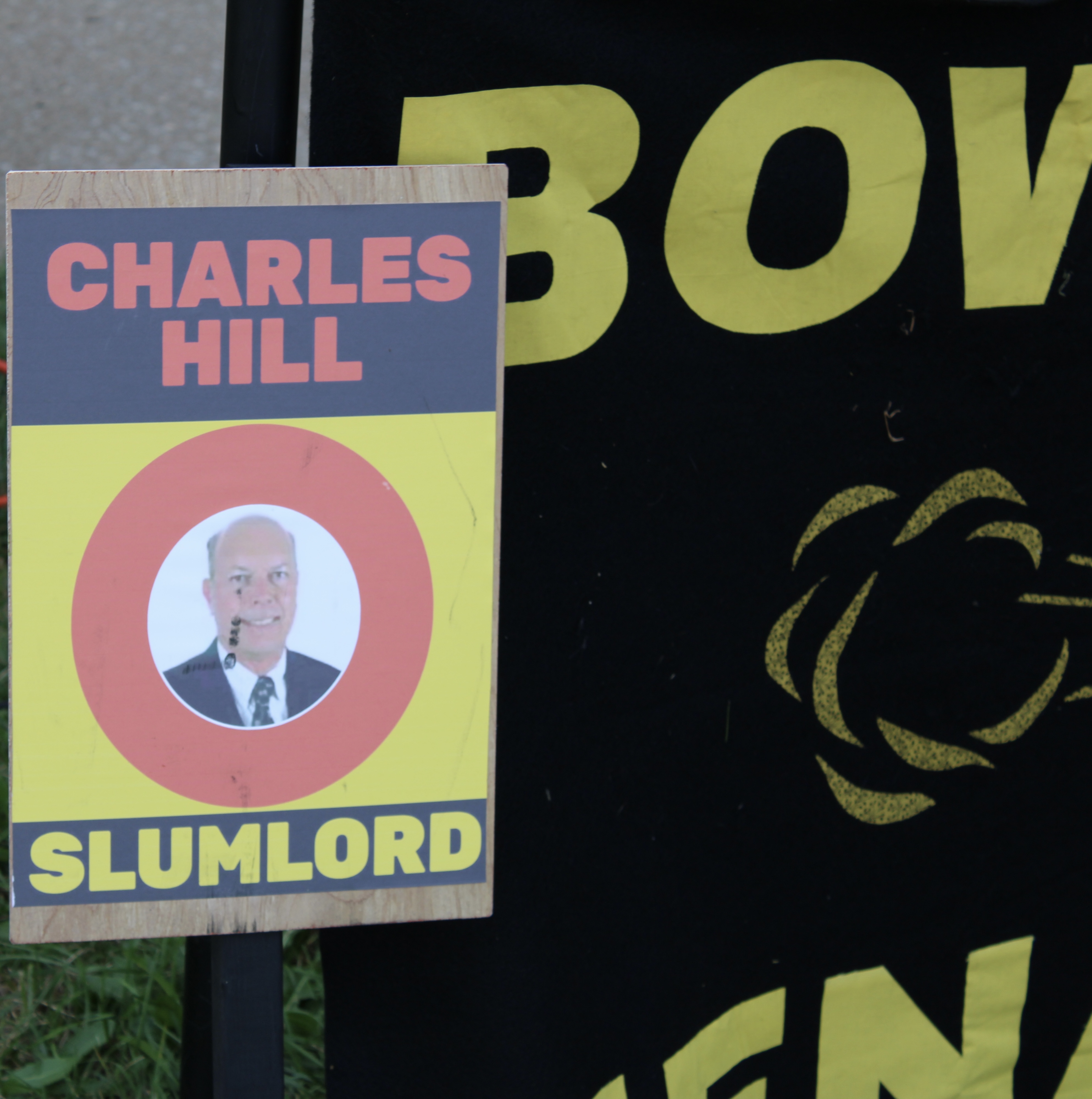
Bowen Tower union members display signs alleging that their landlord, Charles Hill, is a slumlord.

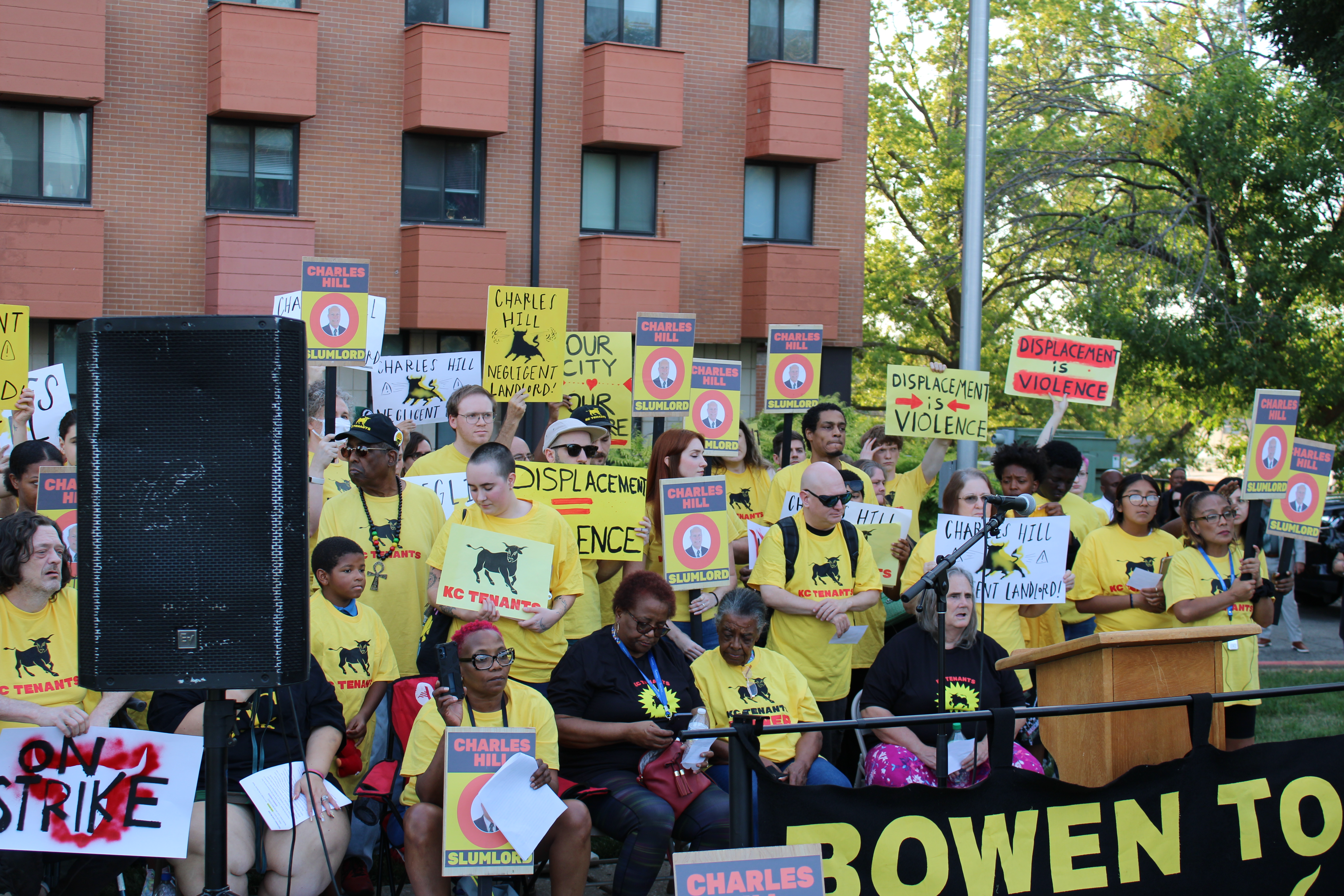
Bowen Tower tenants go on rent strike on October 1, 2025 in Raytown, Missouri.

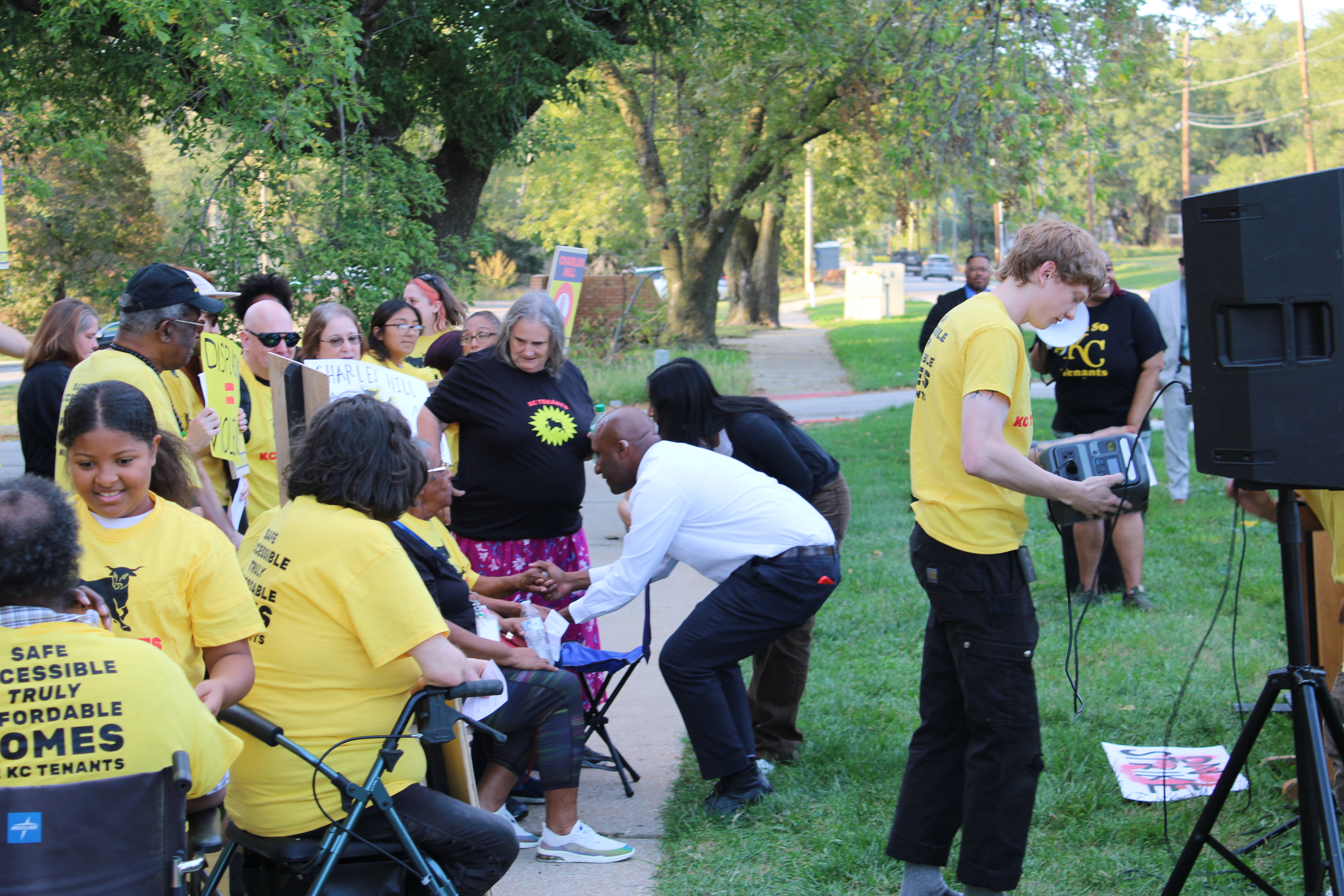
Kansas City mayor Quinton Lucas shows support for KC Tenants members on strike at Bowen Towers in Raytown, Missouri.

=== 2026 ===
==== North Lawn Apartments ====
On Aug 21, 2026, residents of North Lawn Apartments were forced to move out of their homes by Kansas City police after the building was deemed unsafe owning to electrical and sea wage concerns. The North Lawn Tenant Union demanded that the city “provide and pay for temporary relocation for displaced residents.” In the past, KC Tenants and the residents had campaigned for better living conditions for the “historically neglected” property which predominantly houses immigrant and refugee families. KC Tenants met with Mayor Quinton Lucas to advocate for a relocation agreement while the North Lawn Tenant Union held a bargaining session with the landlord. On Aug 28, 2026, it was announced that the residents had reached a deal with the new landlord that lowers rent, establishes a timeline for repairs, and permits the right to return.

== Yeehaw fundraisers ==
2026 Yeehaw show

KC Tenants organizes a yearly benefit variety show called "Yeehaw". The show, now performed at the Uptown Theater in Kansas City, features a mix of comedy performances and musical acts. Caleb Hearon and Waxahatchee are repeat headliners. In 2024, Raghuveer stated that "it absolutely makes it so that the Tenants Union is a known quantity to a bunch of people in Kansas City who might not have known about us before." According to the group, the 2026 fundraiser raised $142,000.

== See also ==
- Affordable housing
- Housing in the United States
- Homelessness
- List of tenant unions in the United States
- Tenants union
