= Dayton Tenant Union =

Housing rights organization in Ohio, US

- Founded: 2023
- Headquarters: Dayton, Ohio
- Location: United States
- Key people: Destiny Brown (founder)
- Website: www.daytontenantunion.com

The Dayton Tenant Union (DTU) is a tenants union based in Dayton, Ohio. It was founded in 2023 by Destiny Brown.

== History ==
In 2024, Dayton Tenant Union supported renewing income tax in the city and adding housing funding on the ballot. The campaign was successful and is expected to raise $15 million per year, but union members called for clear usage of funding and the creation of a $650,000 housing trust fund. DTU has advocated for using housing trust funds on a tenant right to counsel program.

DTU demanded a seat on Dayton's housing steering committee in 2024, but union members claimed the city was "freezing them out." Dayton city manager Shelley Dickstein responded, "There’s been no refusal, no intentional exclusion nor disagreement about having tenants on the steering committee. In fact, I think it’s a good idea."

The tenant union hosts know-your-rights presentations and "assists tenants with legal support."
