= Johnathan Duncan =

Kansas City, Missouri council member

- Duncan in 2023

Member of the Kansas City City Council from the 6th district
- Incumbent
- Assumed office August 1, 2023
- Preceded by: Kevin McManus

Personal details
- Education: University of Kansas
- Occupation: Politician
- Website: Official website

Johnathan Duncan is an American politician who has represented the 6th district on the Kansas City, Missouri, City Council since August 1, 2023. He was elected in June 2023, defeating former Jackson County legislator Dan Tarwater.

Before taking office, Duncan worked as director of administrative operations at the national headquarters of the Veterans of Foreign Wars and was an organizer with the tenant union KC Tenants. He served in the Iraq War and graduated from the University of Kansas.

== Early life and education ==
Duncan grew up in Newton, Kansas. He enlisted in the Kansas Army National Guard at age 17 to help pay for college and began studying at the University of Kansas. His unit, the 161st Field Artillery, was activated in October 2005 for deployment to Iraq, where he served as a specialist. He returned to the United States in 2007 after an 18-month deployment.

After his deployment, Duncan resumed his studies at Kansas and earned a degree in English. He participated in the university's Collegiate Veterans Association, which helped student veterans with enrollment and tuition issues and worked to establish a veterans' lounge. He has spoken publicly about experiencing post-traumatic stress after his military service and receiving help from other veterans.

== Career and organizing ==
In 2013, Duncan worked as a sales manager at a sign company in Lawrence, Kansas, and was preparing to become junior vice commander of the local VFW post. He later worked at the VFW's national headquarters in Kansas City as director of administrative operations. He left that job in July 2023 to serve full-time on the city council.

Duncan organized with KC Tenants before his council campaign. During the COVID-19 pandemic, he participated in the union's disruptions of virtual eviction hearings. He said the displacement of residents from the Heart Village mobile home park for a new Jackson County jail prompted him to run for office.

== Kansas City Council ==
=== 2023 election ===
Duncan ran for the 6th district's in-district council seat in 2023. He ran to succeed Kevin McManus. Duncan received support from KC Tenants Power, the union's political organization. During the campaign, he supported publicly financed housing rented below market rates and reparations for Black residents, and opposed adding police officers.

In the April 4 primary, Duncan finished second with 2,805 votes, behind Tarwater's 5,304. Duncan defeated Tarwater in the June 20 general election, receiving 6,903 votes to Tarwater's 5,313, or approximately 56.5 percent of the vote. He took office on August 1, 2023.

=== Housing and homelessness ===
In April 2024, Duncan voted against restarting the application process for a proposed low-barrier homeless shelter. The council's 8-to-2 decision required the nonprofit Hope Faith to reapply for more than $7 million in federal funding. Duncan criticized the decision as inconsistent with the council's commitments to residents experiencing homelessness.

In July 2026, Duncan sponsored an emergency measure authorizing city-funded repairs at North Lawn Apartments, where residents had reported sewage problems, infestations and utility outages. The measure provided for recovery of repair costs from the property owner through a special tax assessment. In August, the council repealed the measure and directed the city manager to negotiate a repair agreement with the new owner, earmarking $500,000 for tenant relocation assistance. City Manager Mario Vasquez cited safety, liability and contracting concerns. Duncan opposed the replacement plan.

=== Public safety and transportation ===
In September 2024, Duncan was the sole opponent of a council decision to allocate $16 million to a temporary detention facility at police headquarters. He sought to delay the vote until the financial implications were clearer and argued that the city should devote more resources to prevention. In October 2025, he was again the only dissenting council member when the city approved $22 million for a temporary modular jail. He questioned how the spending would affect funding for rehabilitation and reintegration.

During consideration of the city's 2026–2027 budget, Duncan proposed moving some police funding above the state-required minimum to bus service. The amendment failed; Eric Bunch was the only other council member to support it. In June 2026, Mayor Quinton Lucas appointed Duncan to the board of commissioners of the Kansas City Area Transportation Authority.

=== Stadium financing ===
In August 2026, Duncan voted against an agreement providing $600 million in city funding for a proposed Kansas City Royals stadium at Crown Center. The council approved the agreement 11 to 2. Duncan criticized the financial terms and the opportunities for public participation in the decision.

In September 2026, Duncan voted against up to $185 million in public financing for an expansion of CPKC Stadium and related riverfront development. The measure passed 9 to 3, with Nathan Willett and Melissa Patterson Hazley also voting against it. Duncan argued that the financing would divert revenue from the city's general fund despite the developers' guarantee to cover debt-payment shortfalls.

=== LGBTQ policy ===
Duncan sponsored a resolution adopted in June 2024 directing the city manager to assess the needs of Kansas City's transgender residents and recommend services and funding. It required consultation with the transgender community and the city's LGBTQ Commission. The assessment was in draft form in June 2025, when Duncan called for action on its recommendations.

In May 2026, Duncan voted with the council majority to repeal Kansas City's 2019 ban on conversion therapy. The repeal passed 7 to 5 amid litigation against the city and a U.S. Supreme Court ruling concerning a similar Colorado law. Duncan cited the potential cost of litigation, but later expressed regret that the city had not consulted LGBTQ leaders or prepared a replacement before repealing the ban.

In June, Duncan and Lucas announced a proposal to prohibit compensated therapeutic practices defined as harmful. The proposal addressed harms such as self-injury and depression and would apply to adults as well as minors. At an August 22 public forum, participants reviewed draft language and raised concerns about enforcement, scope and possible legal challenges.

== Electoral history ==
Kansas City City Council, 6th district primary, April 4, 2023
Candidate	Votes	%
Dan T. Tarwater III	5,304	45.4
Johnathan Duncan	2,805	24.0
Tiffany Moore	1,450	12.4
Cecelia Carter	1,350	11.6
Michael Schuckman	744	6.4
Write-in	34	0.3
Total	11,687	100.0

Percentages may not sum to 100 because of rounding.

Kansas City City Council, 6th district general election, June 20, 2023
Candidate	Votes	%
Johnathan Duncan	6,903	56.5
Dan T. Tarwater III	5,313	43.5
Total	12,216	100.0
