= Los Angeles Tenants Union =

Tenants union in California, United States

- Sindicato de Inquilinos de Los Angeles
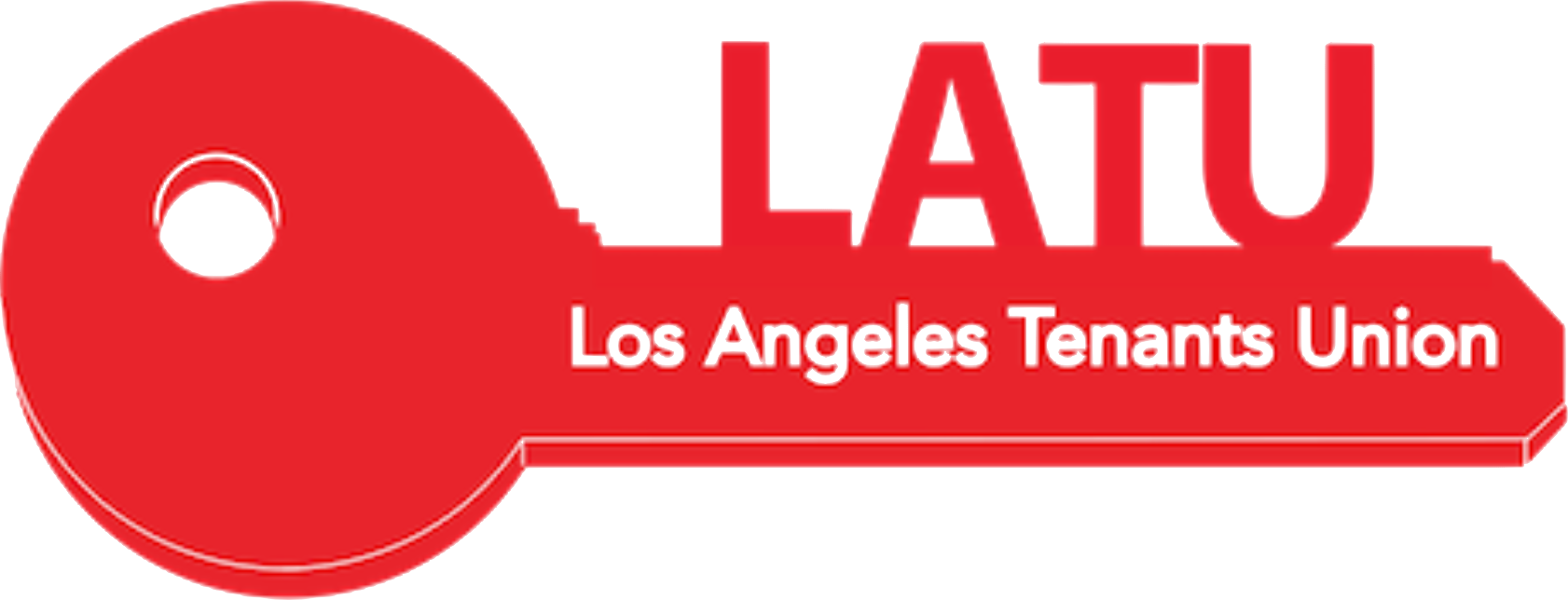
- Formation: July 18, 2015; 11 years ago
- Headquarters: Los Angeles
- Members: ~3000 (2024)
- Website: https://latenantsunion.org/

The Los Angeles Tenants Union (LATU) (Spanish: Sindicato de Inquilinos de Los Angeles) or LA Tenants Union is an American tenants union, which organizes tenants in the Los Angeles area. It is a bilingual organisation operating in both Spanish and English.

As of 2024 the LATU has over 3000 due paying members and 17 chapters (or "locals") across the Los Angeles area. It has been involved in organising numerous successful rent strikes in the Los Angeles area.

== History ==
The LATU was co-founded in 2015 by Tracy Rosenthal and Leo Vilchis. Since then the LATU has been involved in various organising efforts, lobbying campaigns and protests for tenants rights. The LATU has a history of working with other left wing grassroots organisations, such as the Los Angeles chapter of the Democratic Socialists of America.

=== Mariachi Plaza Rent Strike ===
On June 1st 2017, tenants of the Mariachi Plaza building in Boyle Heights went on rent strike after being organised by Los Angeles Tenants Union organisers. After months of striking and protesting, on February 12th 2018 the tenants and the buildings landlord signed a collective bargained lease. This was the first ever collectively bargained lease in Los Angeles history.

The Mariachi Plaza rent strike would be the first successful rent strike of many. There were over half a dozen rents strikes organised by the Los Angeles Tenants Union between 2016 and 2019.

=== Abolish Rent ===
Abolish Rent - How Tenants Can End the Housing Crisis
- Author: Tracy Rosenthal and Leo Vilchis
- Publisher: Haymarket Books
- Publication date: February 1, 2025
- Pages: 224
- ISBN: 979-8-888-902523

In 2024 Tracy Rosenthal and Leo Vilchis published the book Abolish Rent: How Tenants Can Solve the Housing Crisis. The book documents the history of the Los Angeles Tenants Union, as well as arguing and advocating for tenants to organise themselves to create a world where rent itself is abolished. The book and its contents has been influential on the broader tenants union movement. Because of the book, the Australian tenants union Renter and Housing Union adopted "abolition of rent" as one their objectives.

=== Hillside Villa Rent Strike ===
In 2025, a deal was struck to end a building rent strike in Chinatown. Organised by the LATU, the tenants stopped paying rent and began a rent strike in late 2020. The strike went for 5 years, and is one of the longest recorded rent strikes in history.

=== Opposition to ICE ===
Since 2025 the union has been heavily involved with campaigns to oppose escalated deportation raids in Los Angeles. With the LATU calling for a city wide rent strike and a moratorium on evictions as due to the escalation of deportation raids.

== Organisation ==
The Los Angeles Tenants Union itself is not a registered non-for-profit. Instead it acts as a over arching organisation to facilitate a decentralised network for various local member lead chapters across Los Angeles. These chapters organise volunteers to organise on local issues, conduct outreach, and work with the community. Tenants organised in buildings are organised as tenant associations, which are then affiliated to the local chapters.

The union also has various committees that help assist and organise the union itself.

== See Also ==
- List of tenant unions in the United States
- Tenant Union Federation
- Los Angeles Democratic Socialists of America
