= List of tenant unions in the United States =

This article is a list of active tenant unions in the United States of America.

== Active tenant unions ==
The list does not include union locals of tenant unions. The list also does not include broader tenant advocacy organizations

=== Arizona ===
- Tucson Tenants Union
- Valley Tenants Union

=== California ===
- Los Angeles Tenants Union
- Lennox-Inglewood Tenants Union
- Compton Tenants Union
- Burbank Tenants Union
- Glendale Tenants Union
- Long Beach Tenants Union
- Pasadena Tenants Union
- Tenants United Santa Ana
- San Diego Tenants United
- San Francisco Tenants Union

=== Connecticut ===
- Cargill Tenants Union
- Connecticut Tenants Union

=== Illinois ===
- Autonomous Tenants Union
- Northside Tenants Union
- North Spauling Renters' Association
- Southside Together
- Tenants United Chicago

=== Kansas ===
- Lawrence Tenants
- Renters Together Manhattan Kansas

=== Kentucky ===
- Lexington Tenants Union
- Louisville Tenant Union

=== Massachusetts ===
- Greater Boston Tenants Union
- Worcester Tenants Union

=== Michigan ===
- Ann Arbor Tenants Union
- Lansing Tenants Union
- Grand Rapids Area Tenants Union
- Greater Kalamazoo Renters' Union

=== Missouri ===
- Kansas City Tenants Union

=== Montana ===
- Bozeman Tenants United

=== New York ===
- Crown Heights Tenant Union
- Brooklyn Eviction Defense Tenant Union
- Ridgewood Tenants Union

=== Nebraska ===
- Omaha Tenants United

=== North Carolina ===
- North Carolina Tenants Union

=== Oklahoma ===
- Oklahoma Tenants Union

=== Oregon ===
- Portland Tenants United
- Don't Evict PDX
- Housing and Neighborhood Defense

=== Pennsylvania ===
- Philadelphia Tenants Union

=== Rhode Island ===
- Providence Organization of Workers and Renters

=== South Dakota ===
- West River Tenants United

=== Texas ===
- Houston Tenants Union
- Tenants Union San Antonio
- Bowie Tenants Union (Austin)

=== Virginia ===
- Richmond Tenants Union

=== West Virginia ===
- Huntington Tenants' Union

=== Washington ===
- Tenants Union of Washington State

=== Wisconsin ===
- Madison Tenant Power
- Milwaukee Autonomous Tenants Union

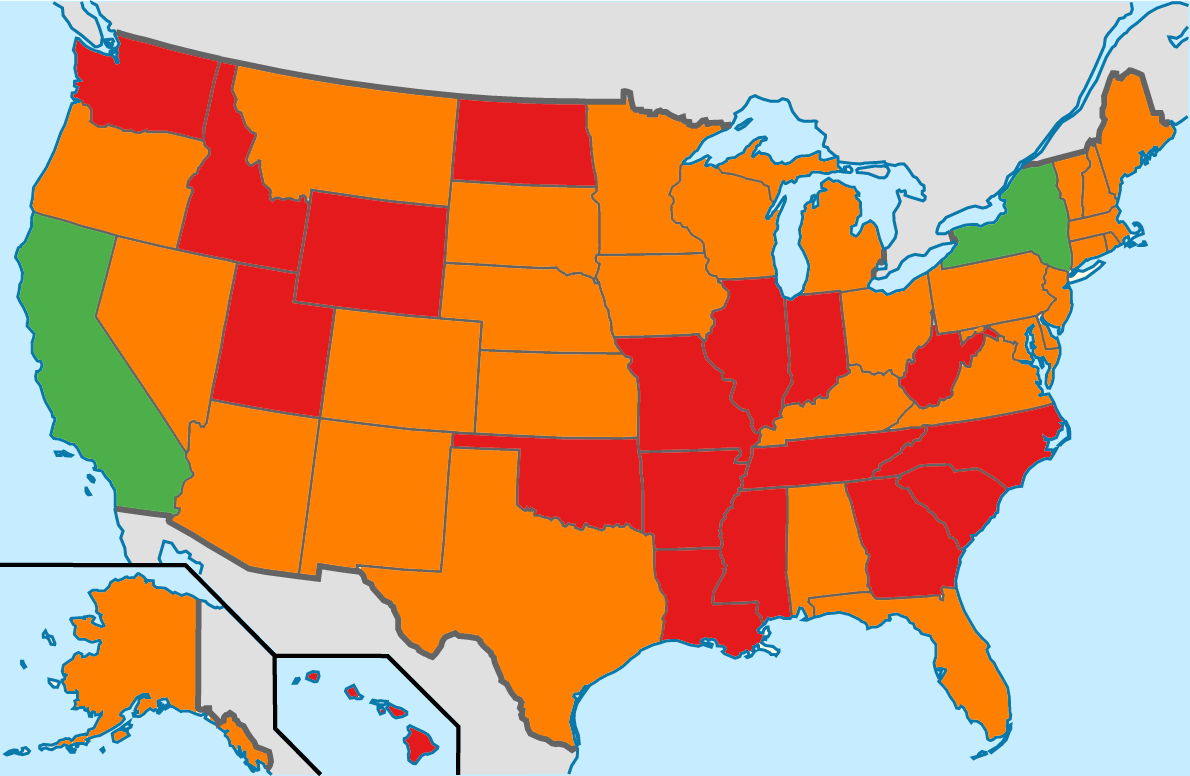
Legal protections for tenant union organizing by state, 2018. The color red indicates that a state has no legal protections for tenant unions (Category 3), while states colored in green afford multiple legal protections for tenant unions (category 1).

== Legal protection ==
In a 2018 survey of state law, two states and D.C. were found to have substantial protections for tenant unions and tenant union organizing (Category 1 states listed below); twenty-nine other states protected tenant union organizing (Category 2 states listed below); and nineteen states had no laws protecting tenant associations or tenant association organizing (Category 3 states below).

Legal Protections for Tenant Union Organizing in the United States by State
State	Category	Protections
Alabama	2	Uniform and Residential Landlord Tenant Act prohibits retaliation for organizing or being involved with a tenants union.
Alaska	2	Uniform and Residential Landlord Tenant Act prohibits retaliation for organizing or being involved with a tenants union.
Arizona	2	Uniform and Residential Landlord Tenant Act prohibits retaliation for organizing or being involved with a tenants union. Tenants at mobile home and residential vehicle parks have additional rights.
Arkansas	3	No laws found.
California	1	Substantial protections for tenant union organizing. In some circumstances, tenant associations have substantive rights, such as an opportunity to purchase some regulated housing developments or the right to raise some health and safety claims.
Colorado	2	Landlords may not retaliate against tenants for making complaints to the landlord or to governmental entities.
Connecticut	2	Landlords may not retaliate against tenants for organizing or being involved with a tenants union. Tenant unions often have an opportunity to purchase buildings during a conversion to a condominium. Tenant associations have additional rights in state housing projects and in mobile home parks.
Delaware	2	Landlords may not retaliate against tenants who organized or are officers in a tenants’ organization. Tenant associations in manufactured home communities have additional rights.
District of Columbia	1	Tenants have the right to organize, to meet and confer through representatives of their own choosing with the owner, and to engage in concerted activities for mutual aid and protections. Tenant organizers often have the right to canvass in multifamily housing accommodations. Owners may not interfere with tenants' self-organizational activities. Under the Tenant Opportunity to Purchase Act, tenants associations often have an opportunity to purchase rental buildings when the owner wishes to sell them.
Florida	2	Landlords may not retaliate against tenants for organizing, encouraging or participating in a tenant organization. Tenants of mobile home parks have additional rights.
Georgia	3	No laws found.
Idaho	3	No general tenant protection found. Tenants of floating home marinas have the right to form a tenant association. Tenants of mobile and manufactured home parks have additional rights.
Illinois	3	No general tenant protection found. Tenants in assisted housing developments receiving governmental funding have additional rights.
Indiana	3	No general tenant protection found.
Iowa	2	Landlords may not retaliate against tenants for organizing or becoming a member of a tenants union.
Kansas	2	Landlords may not retaliate against tenants for organizing or becoming a member of a tenants’ union.
Louisiana	3	No laws found.
Maine	2	Tenants cannot be evicted if the eviction action was brought in retaliation for tenant union organizing.
Maryland	2	Landlords cannot include in rental agreements any provisions permitting eviction based on tenant union organizing. In Montgomery County, landlords cannot retaliate against tenants for membership in a tenants organization. Mobile home park tenants have additional rights.
Massachusetts	2	In an eviction process, a tenant may raise a defense that the action was brought in retaliation for organizing or joining a tenants union. Any person who retaliates against a tenant for their tenant union activities is liable for damages. Tenants of manufactured home parks and public housing developments have additional rights.
Michigan	2	Tenants may not be evicted action if the eviction was based on retaliation against a tenant for tenant union activities. Tenants of public and affordable housing developments have additional rights.
Minnesota	2	Housing-related neighborhood organizations may bring legal actions for violations of landlord-tenant law on behalf of tenants. They may also request an inspection of facilities. Landlords may not retaliate against tenants for filing complaints. Tenants in manufactured home parks have additional rights.
Mississippi	3	No laws found.
Missouri	3	No laws found.
Montana	2	Landlord may not retaliate against tenants for organizing or being a member of tenant unions. Tenants of mobile home parks have additional rights.
Nebraska	2	Landlord may not retaliate against tenants for organizing or being a member of tenant unions.
Nevada	2	Landlord may not retaliate against tenants for organizing or being a member of tenant unions.
New Hampshire	2	In eviction proceedings, tenants may raise a defense that the eviction is retaliation for tenant union activity. Tenants of mobile and manufactured home parks have additional rights.
New Jersey	2	Landlords may not evict tenants for their membership or involvement in any lawful organization. Landlords may not evict tenants for refusing to comply with terms of tenancy which the landlord altered to retaliate for tenant organization activity.
New Mexico	2	Landlord may not retaliate against tenants for organizing or being a member of tenant unions.
New York	1	Landlords may not interfere with the right of tenants to form, join or participate in tenant organization, and may not punish, harass, or retaliate against tenants for exercising these rights. Tenant unions have the right to meet on the premises in any common use area without having to pay a fee. Limited-profit housing companies must adopt regulations recognizing tenant associations. Tenants in those properties have additional rights. Tenant associations providing services have some additional rights.
North Carolina	3	No laws found.
North Dakota	3	No laws found.
Ohio	2	Landlord may not retaliate against tenants for organizing with each other for the purpose of dealing collectively with the landlord. Low-income housing programs may provide grants to tenant associations.
Oregon	2	Landlord may not retaliate against tenants for organizing or being a member of tenant unions. Tenants in manufactured home and floating home parks have additional rights.
Pennsylvania	2	Landlords may not terminate or decline to renew a lease due to a tenant union organizing or membership.
Puerto Rico	3	No laws found.
Rhode Island	2	Landlord may not retaliate against tenants for organizing or being a member of tenant unions. Tenants in mobile home parks and federally insured or assisted housing have some additional rights.
South Carolina	3	No laws found.
South Dakota	2	Landlord may not retaliate against tenants for organizing or being a member of tenant unions.
Tennessee	3	No laws found.
Texas	2	Landlord may not retaliate against tenants for organizing or being a member of tenant unions. Tenant organizations in low-income housing have additional rights.
Utah	3	No general tenant protections found. Residents of mobile home parks have additional rights.
Vermont	2	Landlord may not retaliate against tenants for organizing or being a member of tenant unions.
Virginia	2	Landlord may not retaliate against tenants for organizing or being a member of tenant unions.
Washington	3	No laws found.
West Virginia	3	No general tenant protections found. Tenants in house trailers, mobile homes, manufactured homes, and modular homes are protected from eviction for tenant union organizing or membership.
Wisconsin	2	Landlord may not retaliate against tenants for organizing or being a member of tenant unions.
Wyoming	3	No laws found.
Oklahoma	3	No laws found.
Kentucky	2	Landlords may not retaliate against tenants for organizing or becoming a member of a tenants’ union. Provides some services to tenants living in low incoming housing, including advisory services for creating tenant organizations to “which will assume a meaningful and responsible role in the planning and carrying out of housing affairs.”
Hawaii	3	Tenant organizations have the right to sue in the organization’s name to abate nuisance. Resident advisory boards are established for public housing projects.

== See also ==
- List of tenant union federations
