= City Council of Kansas City, Missouri =

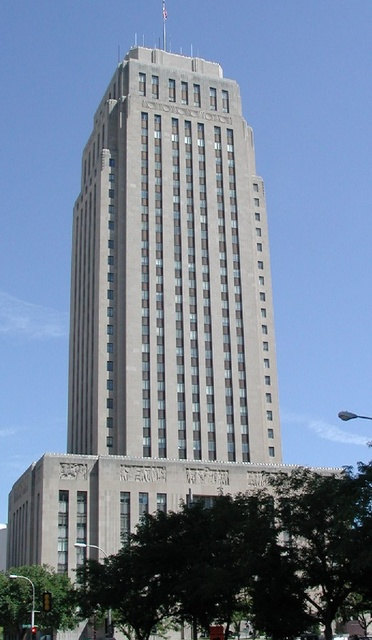
The Kansas City, Missouri The City Council meets on the 26th floor of Kansas City City Hall and its offices are on the 22nd floor

The Kansas City, Missouri City Council represents the population of more than 500,000 citizens.

Kansas City, Missouri is the largest city in the state, divided into 6 council districts, based on population. Each district is assigned one council member, who is elected every four years by the members of that district. Each district also gets one at-large member, who represents the district but is elected by the voters of the entire city. Based on this formula, there are 12 members total. However, the Mayor of Kansas City, Missouri, also elected by the voters of the city every 4 years, presides over all meetings and has a vote at meetings, making him a member of the council as well. The Mayor also appoints a mayor pro tem to serve as mayor in the event the real mayor is unable to perform his duties.

City Council members:

Mayor: Quinton Lucas

1st District (The Northern Northland)

- Kevin O'Neill (At-large)
- Nathan Willett

2nd District (The Central Northland)

- Lindsay French (At-large)
- Wes Rodgers

3rd District (The East Side)

- Melissa Patterson-Hazley (At-large)
- Melissa Robinson

4th District (SW Northland, Downtown, Midtown, The Northeast)

- Crispin Rea (At-large)
- Eric Bunch

5th District (The Southeast Side)

- Darrell Curls (At-large)
- Ryana Parks-Shaw (Mayor Pro Tem)

6th District (South Kansas City, Waldo, Brookside, Country Club District (including the Plaza), UMKC)

- Andrea Bough (At-large)
- Johnathan Duncan
