= 2025 Chicago ACTA rent strikes =

Rent strikes in US

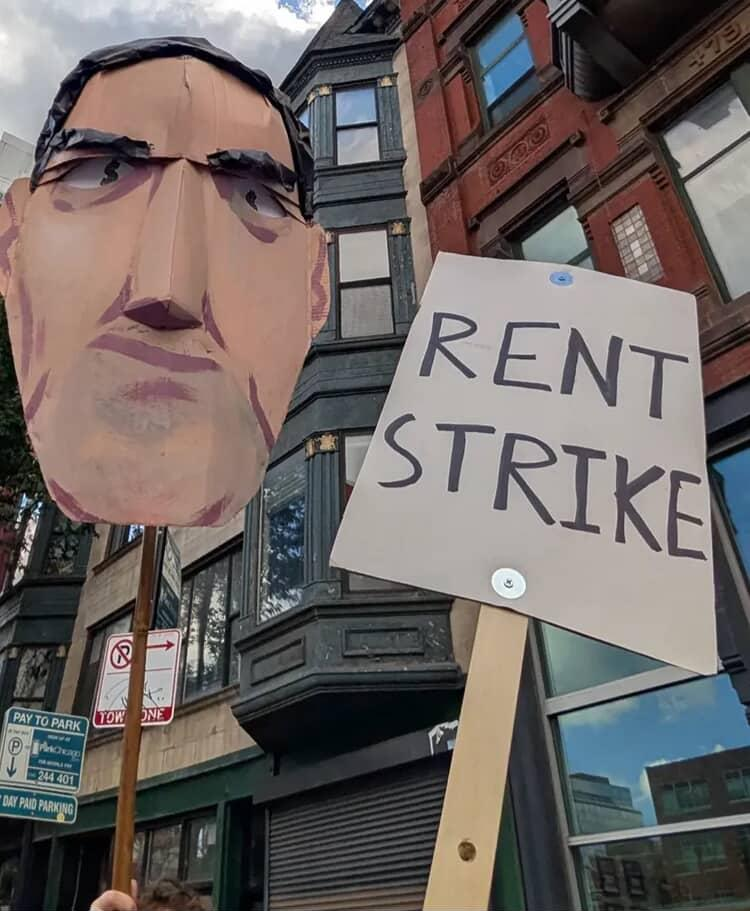
- Picketing Chicago ACTA rent strikers with paper mache of landlord Drew Millard and a rent strike sign in view.
- Date: March 1, 2025 - Ongoing BSTA: March 1, 2025 - September 2025
- Location: Chicago
- Caused by: Acquisition of properties, and non-renewal of leases; Renoviction by landlords

Parties
All Chicago Tenant Alliance; Belden Sawyer Tenant Association; Fuerzas Inquilinos de Broadway y Cuyler; Fuerzas Activas De La Damen	Concord Capital; 33 Realty Property Management; Ark Management Solutions

The 2025 Chicago ACTA rent strikes are two rent strikes against Concord Capital following their acquisition of two separate properties, announcement of renovations and plans to not renew leases for all current tenants. The strikes are being held by the Belden Sawyer Tenant Association (BSTA) and Fuerzas Inquilinos de Broadway y Cuyler (FIBC), with coordination and support by the broader All Chicago Tenant Alliance (ACTA). In addition Fuerzas Activas De La Damen -while not on rent strike as of August, 2025- is protesting against rent increases in its Roger Park Apartments, and is working alongside the ACTA.

== Background ==
=== Heatwaves and air conditioners ===
The rent strikes have roots in early organizing efforts by the All-Chicago Tenant Alliance (ACTA) prior. One effort to organizing tenants self-titled as the "People's Cooling Army", where the ACTA provided and installed free repaired air conditioner units for low-income tenants in Humboldt, Garfield Park, and Hermosa. One organizer stated "it's a noble gesture to give away ACs, but we are in the pursuit of organizing tenants".

The ACTA's cooling efforts were fully powered by AC unit donations. The ACTA was able to receive around a 100 units but with 2,000 applications in one month for AC units, handled by the then nine member group. The ACTA was founded in 2020 as the North Spaulding Renters Association, eventually becoming the ACTA in 2024.

=== Planned renovations and rent hikes ===
On December 24, 2024, tenants of Sawyer and Belden avenues were informed that their building which had been recently purchased by Drew Millard, a private real estate investor with 33 Realty now managing the building, would be renovated. 33 Realty had been contracted to renovate the building into luxury apartments, and that all current tenants would not have their leases renewed.

Facing fierce pushback from tenants, 33 Realty then sent another letter saying that residents could now extend their lease through October 2025, but a pay 25% rent increase during the period which it had been extended. Tenants of Sawyer & Belden Avenue had been paying between $1,200-1,500 for one or two bedroom apartments. After the renovations, at minimum Millard plans to charge $2,400 a month.

Shortly after the change in ownership, garbage services were canceled in December with tenants told to keep their garbage in their apartments. This was fixed six days later, after a citation had been received from the Department of Streets and Sanitation. Realty 33 also violated the city's fair notice ordinance by not providing a 120 days notice to terminate a lease for those who have lived in the apartment for more for three years.

In response to facing the non-renewal of their leases, residents created the Belden Sawyer Tenant Association (BSTA) Local 1, met with public officials, and publicized the conflict by placing signs in their windows.

Alderman Carlos Ramirez-Rosa (of the 35th ward), who had met with the union, said, "I commend the tenants for coming together and organizing the Belden Sawyer Tenant Association because that is so critically important towards achieving housing justice"

On February 10, 2025, members of the BSTA picketed outside the offices of Concord Capital and 33 Realty, both owned by Drew Millard, chanting “33, what do you say? We want to negotiate!”. On the issue resident Devon Carson said:

"Drew has not communicated with us... He’s put us in contact with various people at his company, but we want to talk to him. This isn’t some mom-and-pop landlord that’s trying to make a living in Chicago. They own properties all over Indiana, Michigan and Texas, and it’s all the same story.”

== Strikes ==
=== Tenant Unions ===
==== Belden Sawyer Tenant Association (BSTA) rent strike ====
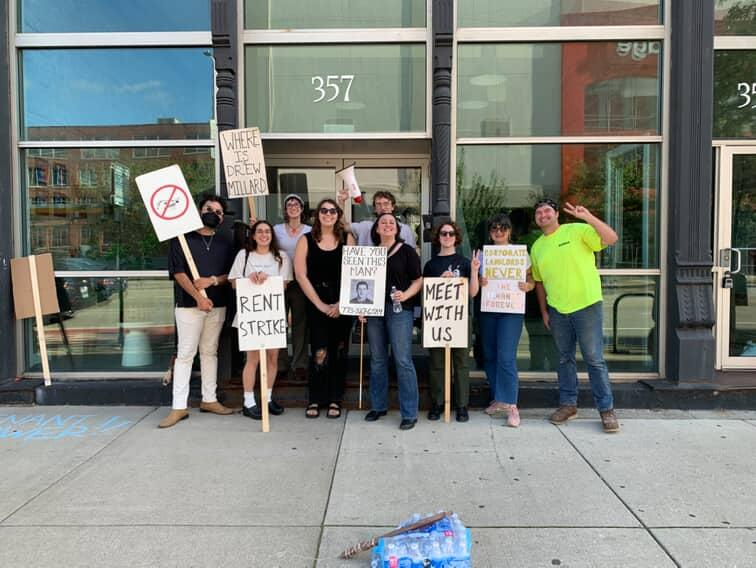
Picketing Chicago ACTA rent strikers in front of 33 Realty

On March 1, 2025, BSTA begin its rent strike, in an effort to negotiate with Andrew Millard and 33 Realty. Their strike ended in September after reaching a deal with the landlord, but tenants have to move out by October 31, 2025.

==== Fuerzas Inquilinos de Broadway y Cuyler (FIBC) rent strike ====
On April 1, 2025, Fuerzas Inquilinos de Broadway y Cuyler (FIBC), a partner union of BSTA joined the strike as well.

Tenants of the FIBC had received a notice in February that they would need to vacate their apartments within four months, as it had been bought up by Concord Capital, the same business involved in BSTA's building. The buyer was planning renovations to turn into luxury apartments, no clarification was given to what the new rents would be. One of the tenants notes how the building is in desperate need of renovations but not at the cost of housing, as she struggles to afford rent currently.

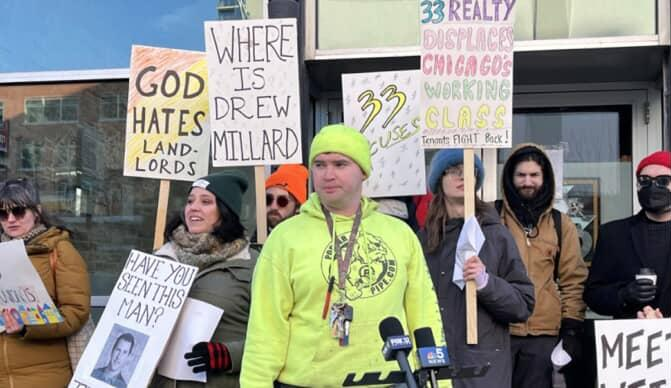
David Amato tenant organizer of the Belden Sawyer Tenant Association at a rent strike picket

The BSTA, after learning of the name of the owner of Realty 33 and subsequently Concord Capital, they were able to find the other properties bought up by Millard, which then lead them to her door. ACTA organizers, who support and work with the BSTA, told Herrara about the tenant union at Sawyer and Belden, and then explained the concept of a tenant union. Within a few weeks the FIBC was formed by 24 of the building's 36 units.

On the acquisitions an organizer with the ACTA, said both were economically enticing to real estate investors as "enclaves in gentrifying areas."

On Sunday, May 18 both unions held a rally in Palmer Square Park.

One demand criteria that the FIBC has made since starting their strike is for the 33 Realty alongside agreeing to FIBC's demands, have to negotiate with the BSTA. In response the BSTA ownership negotiating with the FIBC to their own requirements list.

On April 4, 33 Realty filed evictions against three BSTA members.

==== Fuerzas Activas De La Damen rent strike ====
Around August 24, 2025 the Fuerzas Activas De La Damen tenant union was formed, from tenants of five far North Side apartment buildings, after developer Imran Khan of Ark Management Solutions bought them and raised rents, with some reporting a near doubling of rents. One tenant stated that the current rent for her one-bedroom is $900 but could become $1,400 by the beginning of September, alongside upticks in utilities costs, a new pet fee and worse building services overall.

Tenant organizers warned that renters of the Rogers Park buildings face the risk of eviction as soon as September 1, 2025. A rally was held on August 24, 2025, by the ACTA, calling on Khan to lower rent back to the previous prices:

“We wanted to throw an event where everyone in the neighborhood will know what kind of person this landlord is... We want people to know that we’re trying to negotiate with him, and he’s just refusing to engage”

— Maya Azul, ACTA organizer

The union with around 150 supporters, stated it was open to potentially performing a rent strike. On October 26, 2025 the union announced it was launching a rent strike the next month.

=== ICE Raids ===
In addition one of the core demands of the Chicago tenant unions has been a ICE eviction moratorium, where for those who are afraid to attend work for fear of ICE raids and deportations, to have evictions paused, till such risk ends. The All Chicago Tenant Alliance, Belden Sawyer Tenant Association and Fuerza Activas de la Damen all are calling for such citywide eviction moratorium.

== Aftermath ==
As of November 5, the BSTA rent strike has ended but the two others remain ongoing.

== See also ==
- 2024 Kansas City metropolitan area rent strike
- 1920–1921 Chicago rent strikes
- Rolling rent strike
