= Eviction mediation =

Eviction mediation describes a mediation process between tenants and landlords before or during eviction proceedings as a means of eviction diversion. These processes can be implemented on a voluntary or involuntary basis, typically by court systems or nonprofits. Mediation does not guarantee equal representation in court, unlike tenant right to counsel (TRTC) programs. Mediators must remain impartial, cannot provide legal counsel, and cannot give advice in pursuing counterclaims.

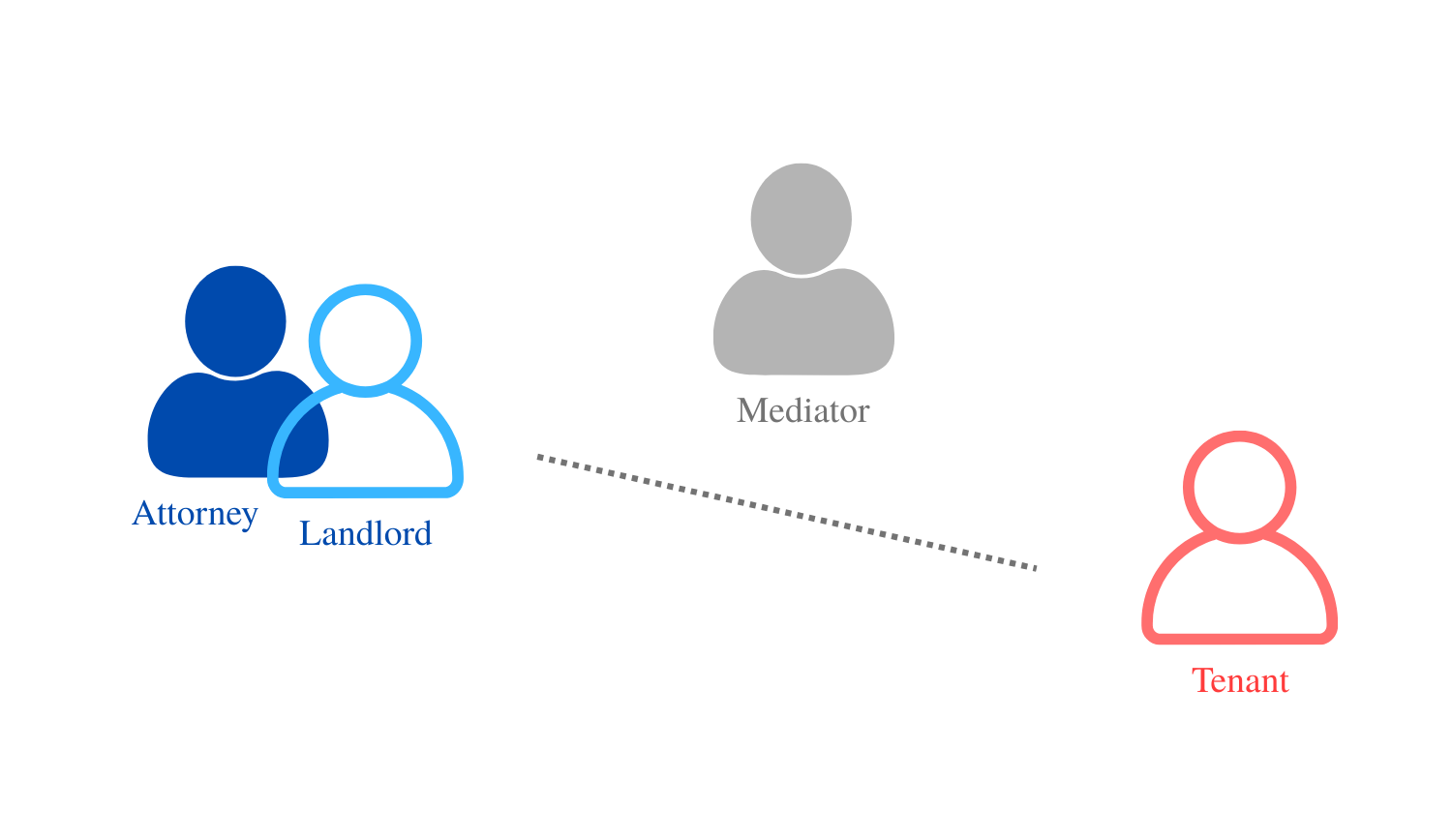
Eviction mediators act as a neutral intermediary between two parties, regardless of capacity for self-representation.

== Background ==
Eviction mediation programs are often intended to lower homelessness and reduce eviction-related violence. Mediation services provide information on the eviction process. Most mediations end in an agreement. Settlements can prevent an eviction from going on a tenant's screening record.

=== Limitations ===
Mediators do not unbalance the leverage landlords have over tenants (rent), but they can settle disputes before an eviction is filed. Tenants, usually being unrepresented, may not understand the ramifications of settlement and may settle for unfair terms.

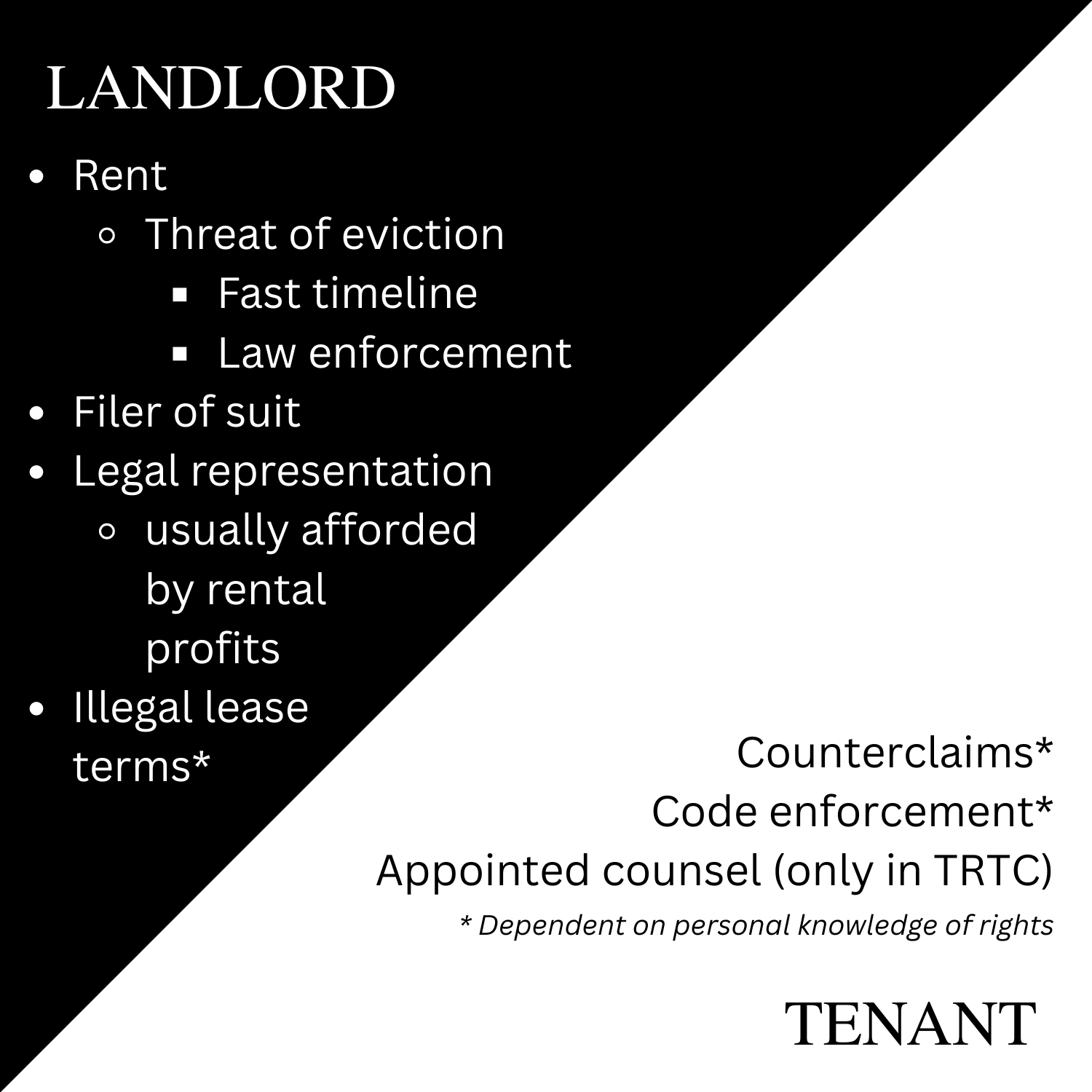
Landlords often have more leverage than tenants during eviction proceedings, creating a challenge for mediation programs.

Mediation does not guarantee an eviction will not go to trial.

== Mediators ==
Mediators may have to be approved before performing duties, such as going through a dispute resolution program. Mediators do not have to have a license to practice law to act as an intermediary in tenant-landlord disputes. Mediators may have limited knowledge of landlord-tenant law.

== Effectiveness ==
The effectiveness of eviction mediation programs varies with a variety of factors, including which stage of the eviction process mediation occurs and willingness of landlords to participate.

=== Participation ===
In systems with voluntary mediation, tenants are more likely to participate in mediation. Since landlords often have an imbalance in negotiating power, they may prefer to let the eviction go to court, especially if the tenant is unlikely to appear and the landlord would win the case by default. One study found landlords were more likely to participate in mediation if tenants had access to legal representation.

=== Intervention ===
Mediation is more successful in pre-file (before an eviction filing) cases. In Philadelphia, landlords must make tenants aware of the mediation diversion program before filing for eviction. Pre-filing could also be accomplished by connecting tenants to eviction mediators upon filing for unemployment or food stamps.

== See also ==
- Conflict management style
