= 2024 Kansas City metropolitan area rent strike =

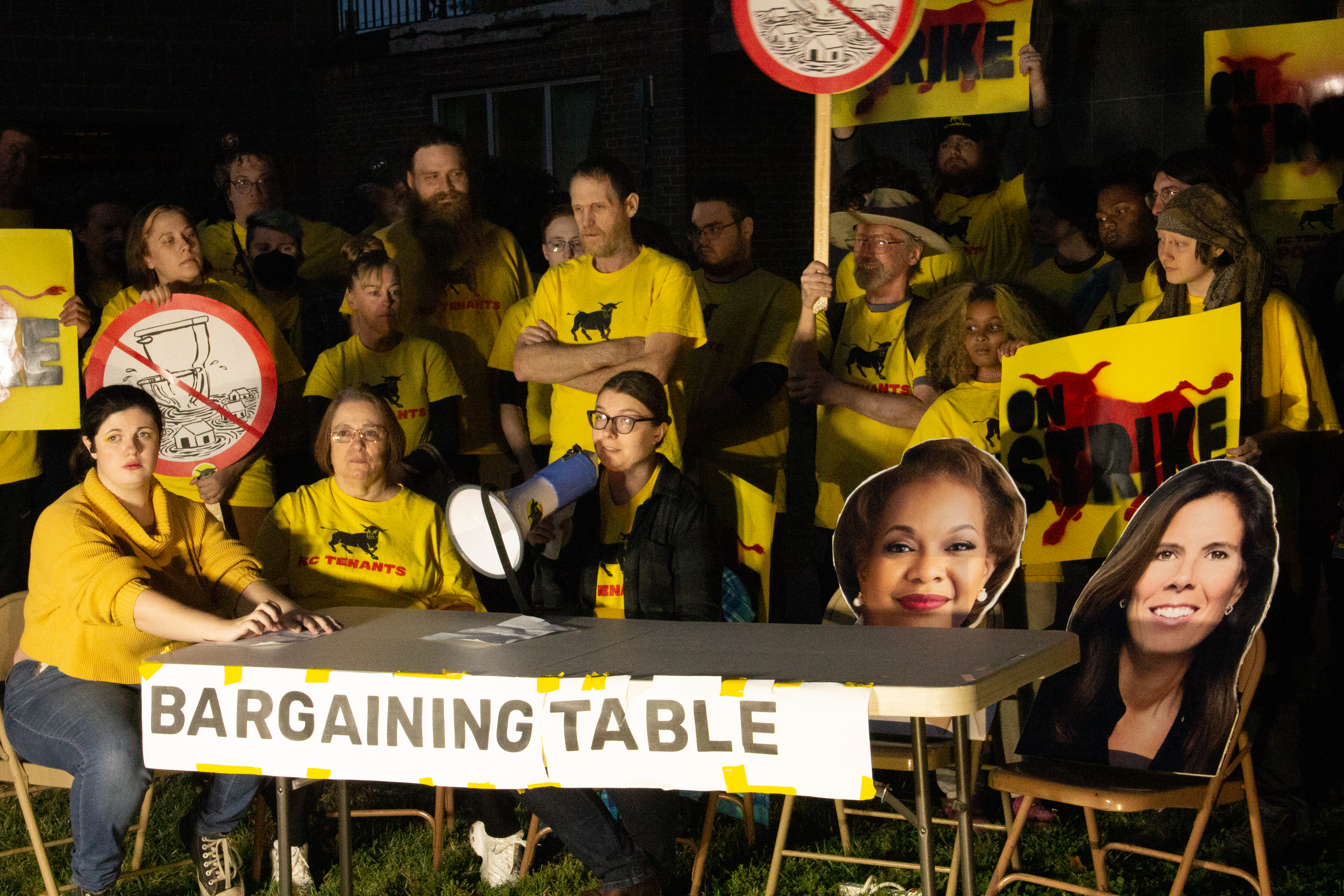
- Date: October 1, 2024 – June 4, 2025
- Location: Kansas City metropolitan area, Missouri: Kansas City, Missouri; Independence, Missouri
- Caused by: Poor living conditions; Failure from the landlords to provide maintenance
- Goals: Collectively bargained leases; National rent caps; New ownership for the complexes
- Methods: Rent strike; Picketing
- Result: Building improvements; Eviction dismissals; Rent discounts; Three-week grace period before eviction notices

Parties
Kansas City Tenants Union; Quality Hill Towers Tenant Union; Independence Towers Tenant Union	Federal Housing Finance Agency; Freddie Mac; Fannie Mae; Sentinel Real Estate Corporation; Trigild, Inc.

From October 1, 2024 to June 4, 2025, members of the Kansas City Tenants Union went on rent strike. The union's members in Kansas City, Missouri and Independence, Missouri voted to take the action after failed negotiations with their landlords and Fannie Mae.

Tenants of Independence Towers and Quality Hill Towers—the two apartment complexes involved with the dispute— complained about poor living conditions, with maintenance reports going unaddressed. This was the first rent strike in the area since 1980, and the first ever targeting the federal government of the United States. The goals of the strikers were federal rent regulation, collectively bargained leases, and new ownership for the complexes.

Sentinel Real Estate Corporation labeled the tenants claims made against them as false and claimed that they were working with the tenants union and were starting maintenance; they said that the strike prevented them from doing so. Tenants claimed that they had seen no significant improvements and said the landlord refused to meet with them to discuss the issue.

== Background ==
Quality Hill Towers is an apartment complex owned by Sentinel Real Estate Corporation, located at 817 Jefferson Street in the West Bottoms neighborhood of Kansas City, Missouri. The building was purchased by the company through a $9 million loan provided by Fannie Mae. Fannie Mae declared the property to be in poor condition and gave Sentinel the loan in an attempt to refinance the complex. It is estimated to house over 250 residents, 140 of which have joined the Kansas City Tenants Union (KC Tenants). Tenants of Quality Hill Towers have stated that the residence has had poor living conditions, with them having to deal with pest infestations and plumbing issues. Tenants were threatened with eviction when they brought up the situation to the landlords, and maintenance requests went unaddressed.

Independence Towers is an apartment complex owned by TriGild, Inc., located in the town of Independence, Missouri. The ownership of the building was given to TriGild after its previous owners, FTW Investments and Tango Management, were ousted by a court in May 2024 after failing to pay back a loan to Fannie Mae. In a similar fashion to Quality Hill Towers, Independence Towers tenants have complained about poor living conditions. Independence Towers passed its city inspection in 2023 amid demand for action.

== Strike ==
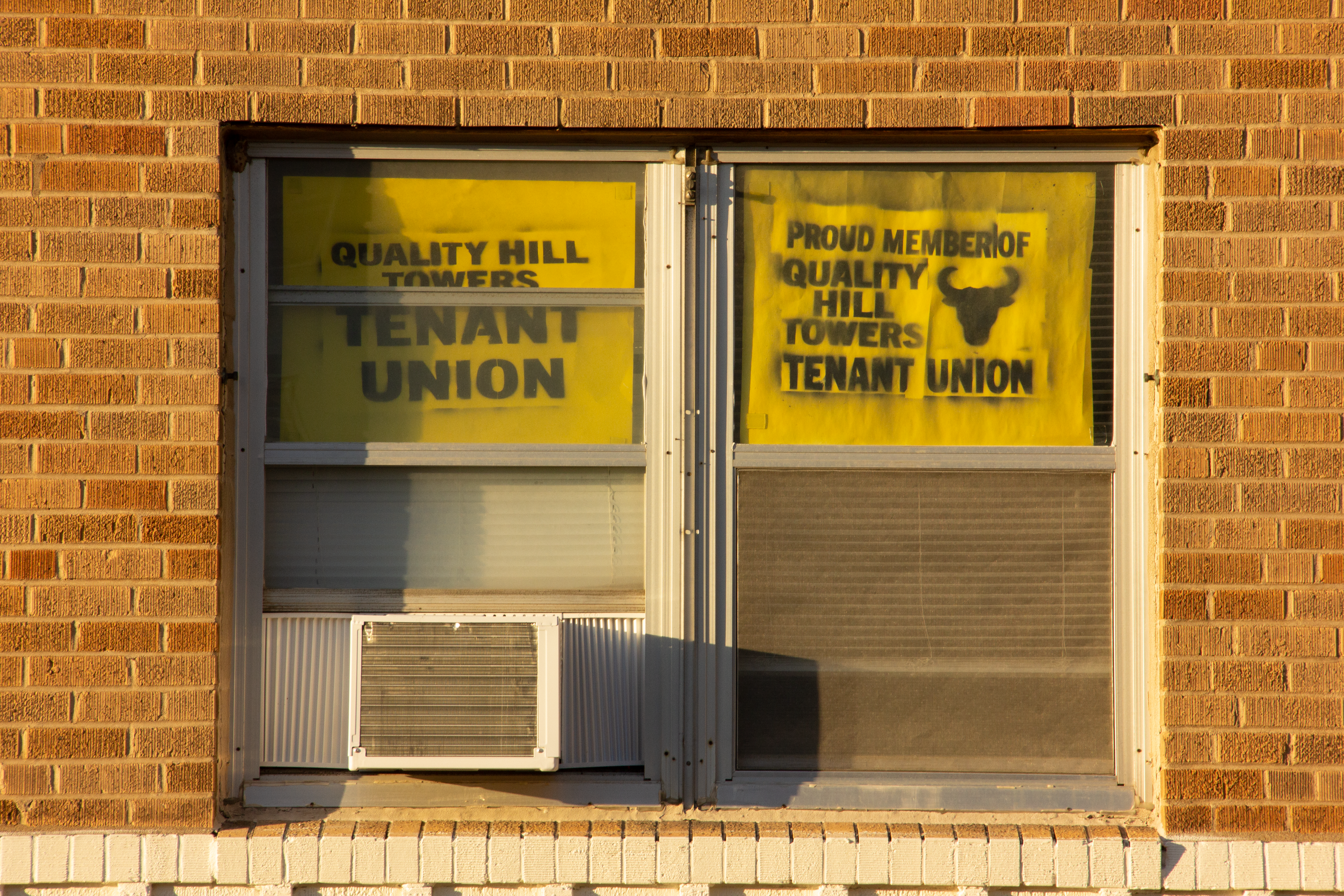
Tenants posted pro-union signs in Quality Hill Towers windows

=== October ===
Following failed negotiations with the landlords and Fannie Mae, the Quality Hill Towers Tenant Union and the Independence Towers Tenant Union voted in favor of a strike starting on October 1, per an announcement by the Kansas City Tenants Union. This is the first rent strike in Kansas City since 1980, and described by tenants as the first ever targeting the Federal Housing Finance Agency, the regulator of Fannie Mae and Freddie Mac. Tara Raghuveer, director of the union, stated they were targeting the American federal government as a way to criticize the systemic issues of the rental market. Tenants initially refused to pay over $60,000 in rent until their demands were met, which included:

- Collectively bargained leases
- National rent caps
- New ownership for the complexes

Sentinel distributed notices to strikers as a "friendly fall reminder", which were burned in retaliation. On October 25, Fannie Mae authorized $1.35 million for repairs at Independence Towers. Union leaders characterized the payout as a bailout and demanded to negotiate directly with FHFA director Sandra Thompson.

=== November ===
The strike continued on November 1, bringing the total withheld rent between the two properties to $125,000. About 24% of renters living in Quality Hill Towers and 57% of renters at Independence Towers were on strike as of November 2024. According to Raghuveer, KC Tenants has been encouraging other tenants unions nationwide to join the strike.

=== December ===
In December 20, NPR reported the rent strike as the longest recorded in Kansas City's history. The Sentinel Real Estate Corporation sent eviction notices to 16 tenants, resulting in KC Tenants accusing Sentinel of retaliatory evictions.

The rent strike was paused in December, as a show of good faith by tenants entering negotiations with Sentinel, with the potential to resume if demands are not met. Since the start of the strike several improvements have been made to the building, including new & serviced boilers, flush valve replacements, repainted doors & hallways, eviction dismissals and thousands of dollars in rent forgiveness. Longstanding maintenance requests have also started to be addressed.

=== End of the strike ===
On June 4, the members of KC Tenants Union voted to end the rent strike. Over the course of the strike, nearly $300,000 in withheld rent was accumulated. The withheld rent was written off as a part of negotiated concessions to the strikers. Other concessions won by the strikers were a commitment to repair HVAC units by November, with a reduction in rent until those repairs are fulfilled, in addition to repairs to dwellings to be completed before the end of the year, and a 3-week grace period before pursuing eviction in future.

== Response ==
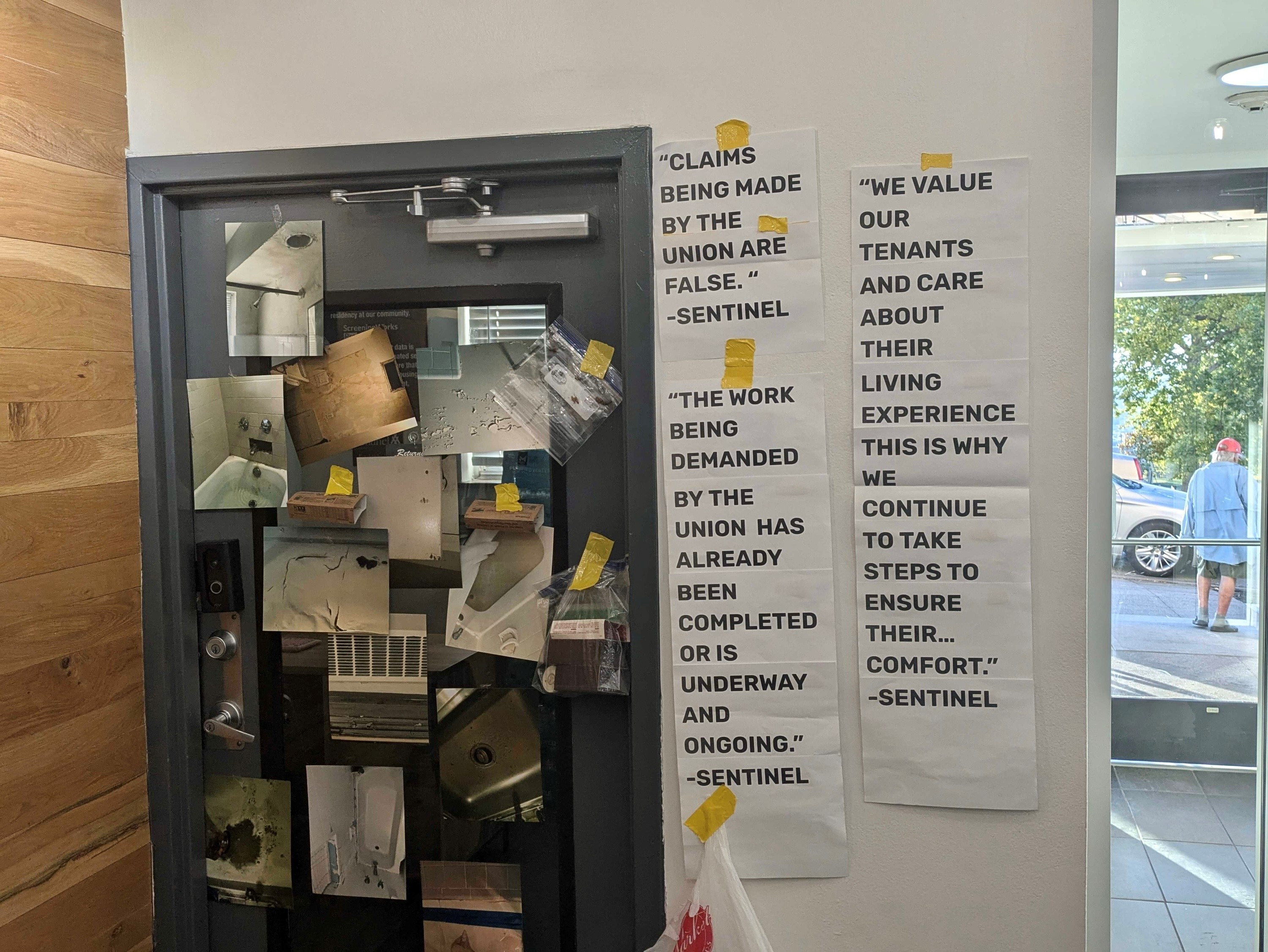
Residents of Quality Hill Towers post photos of allegedly unfulfilled maintenance requests in apartment lobby on Friday, October 18, 2024

Sentinel labeled the statements made by the Kansas City Tenants Union as false, and claimed that they were working with the union. They revealed that maintenance was underway, and asserted that the strike prevented the repairs from happening. A statement from the Quality Hill Towers Union said that several attempts to negotiate with the landlord had been unsuccessful.

In October, Raghuveer claimed that tenants have not seen any significant improvements and that the landlord's statement "added fuel to the fire." Kansas City metropolitan area representative Emanuel Cleaver supported the strike after a visit to Independence Towers, where he described the apartment complex's condition as "horrible".

== See also ==
- 1918–1920 New York City rent strikes
- Tulare County farm labor camps rent strike
- 2025 Chicago ACTA rent strikes
