= Bozeman Tenants United =

Tenants' union based in Bozeman, Montana

- Founded: October 2022
- Headquarters: Bozeman, Montana
- Location: United States
- Key people: Patrick Finegan and Joey Morrison (co-founders)
- Affiliations: Tenant Union Federation
- Website: bzntenantsunited.org

Bozeman Tenants United is a left-leaning tenants' union based in Bozeman, Montana. According to the Tenant Union Federation, which Bozeman Tenants United cofounded, the union has over 200 members and 130 pay union dues. Its founders are organizers who were involved in Bozeman United for Racial Justice.

== History ==
=== Advocacy ===
Union members pressured Bozeman City Council to ban short-term rentals to increase housing supply in June 2023. The city passed strict regulations on short-term rentals that are not owner-occupied but did not pass a full ban.

In June 2024, Bozeman Tenants United and Deputy Mayor Joey Morrison launched a campaign for Bozeman's city council to establish a tenant's right to counsel (TRTC). Organizers argue tenants being unable to afford lawyers leads to higher eviction rates and more homelessness, describing TRTC as "getting to the root cause rather than applying band-aids." The union held a vigil for evicted tenants in June 2025 ahead of a city council vote on TRTC.

=== Electoral politics ===
On November 7, 2023, Bozeman Tenants United cofounder Joey Morrison won the Bozeman mayoral race. Due to the city's electoral system, Morrison will serve as deputy mayor for two years, beginning in 2024, and then become mayor for the rest of his term. Morrison ran on fully banning short-term rentals and establishing community land trusts as a means of addressing housing shortages.

=== Unionization ===
The union supported a successful union drive at Bridger Peaks, a senior community living complex in Bozeman. In November 2024, Bozeman Tenants United organized Bridger Heights, with 58% of units joining the union. The group laid out a list of demands, including a $5000 payout due to tenants allegedly living with mold and other unresolved maintenance issues, rent negotiations, and a say in the result of a sale of the property. Union members threatened a rent strike if demands were not met by their landlords and Capital 11. The union also demanded that the Federal Housing Finance Agency institute a 3% federal cap on rent increases on federally backed loans.

=== Founding of Tenant Union Federation ===
In August 2024, KC Tenants, Connecticut Tenant Union, Louisville Tenant Union, Bozeman Tenants United, and Not Me We founded the Tenant Union Federation. The federation describes its goals as: "use the collective power of its locals to negotiate better living conditions for renters, slow the commodification of housing, help establish alternatives to the predominant market-based solution to housing, guarantee housing as a public utility, and create economic and political power for its renters." The federation's first campaign hopes to cap rent on housing managed by the federal government.

== See also ==
- Affordable housing
- Housing in the United States
- Tenants union
