= Quinton Lucas =

American politician (born 1984)

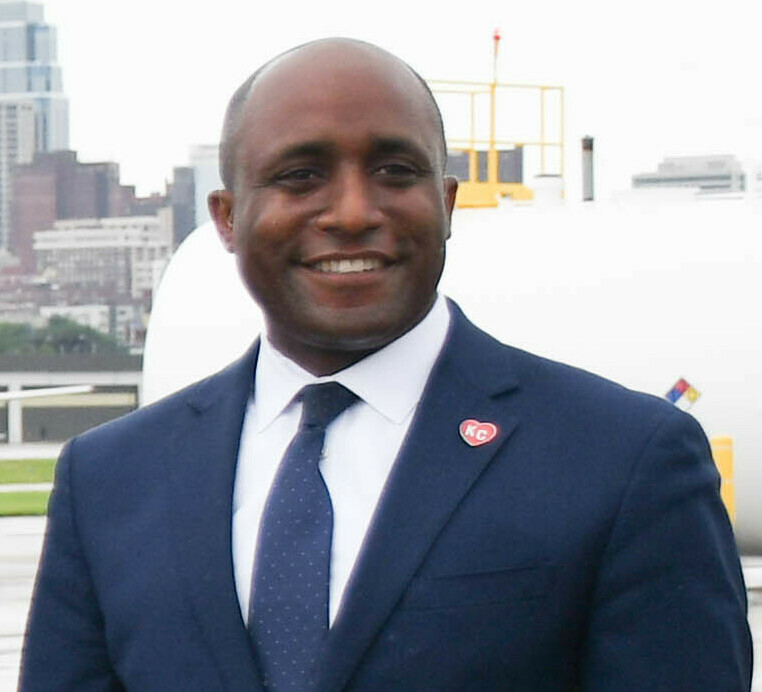
- Lucas in 2021

55th Mayor of Kansas City, Missouri
- Incumbent
- Assumed office August 1, 2019
- Preceded by: Sly James

Personal details
- Born: Quinton Donald Lucas; August 19, 1984 (age 42) Kansas City, Missouri, U.S.
- Party: Democratic
- Spouse: Katherine Carttar
- Children: 2
- Education: Washington University (BA); Cornell University (JD)

Quinton Donald Lucas (born August 19, 1984) is an American politician, lawyer, and academic. On August 1, 2019, he became the 55th mayor of Kansas City, Missouri, the youngest Kansas City mayor since 1855, and the city's third African-American mayor. He is a member of the Democratic Party.

Lucas was born and mostly raised in Kansas City's heavily disadvantaged East Side, experiencing poverty and homelessness during childhood. He earned an academic scholarship to the private high school, The Barstow School. He attended Washington University in St. Louis for his undergraduate degree and earned a Juris Doctor from Cornell Law School. He was a law professor at the University of Kansas School of Law and in private practice, and he continued teaching there during his political career. He was elected to the Kansas City Council in 2015, where he represented the 3rd District-at-large.

As mayor, Lucas has focused on public safety, affordable housing, and infrastructure. His tenure has overseen the completion of major projects, including a new single terminal at Kansas City International Airport. He has supported progressive social policies, such as the local decriminalization of marijuana and making Kansas City a sanctuary city for seeking or providing gender-affirming care. He won the 2019 mayoral election and was reelected in 2023.

== Early life and education ==
Lucas was born in Kansas City, Missouri to Quintanella Lucas, a single mother.

At about age three, his family moved to Hutchinson, Kansas, where he began grade school. Since grade school, he followed politics and current events. His role models included prominent female leaders. At age eight, they returned to Kansas City, which "seemed like the biggest place in the world" at the peak of desegregation litigation amid the decline of KCPS. He grew up in Kansas City's low-income East Side, as the youngest of three children, and his family experienced occasional homelessness. While he was in third grade, his family "snuck in" to his great aunt's nursing home to live there, and Lucas was a mutual delight with the lonely residents. They lived in hotels, and he did homework in the bathroom while his family slept. Due to Kansas City's problem with celebratory gunfire, he said, "there were two nights a year where I would end up sleeping on the floor at my mother's insistence as the fourth of July and on New Year's Eve. Let's try to make a difference for children in Kansas City so they don't have to have that same worry."

By age 10, several relocations had not ruined his focus on schoolwork, so he was nicknamed "the professor". His sister recalled that before school age, he made paper models of city infrastructure, and during his adolescence, he "always acted with a uniquely mature and intelligent demeanor for his age". He saved his money to occasionally buy the family groceries, and coaxed his mother to become a voter. She recalled him as a fair-minded child with concern for all social classes, because "no matter where you're from, you've got problems". In adulthood, he recalled, "I had my challenges as a little kid, but for the most part, I had had this gilded life of good schools, things I wanted to do, positive reinforcement." During his second inauguration speech, he credited his mother's influence and activism.

== Education ==
In third grade, he received an academic scholarship to attend The Barstow School, a private school in the south side of Kansas City, where he served in leadership roles, including as class president, and graduated. He attended Washington University in St. Louis, earning an A.B. degree. His pre-law advisor, Beth Wilner, proposed and assisted in upgrading those notes into a paper on value politics. Its publication in the Journal of Politics and Society reportedly "solidified his identity as a scholar of the American city". Wilner recalled him as gregarious and with a huge smile, but with an "under-the-radar intensity ... He would methodically outline his thesis, the data, his thinking around what he was observing, and any updates he had discovered in the interim. It was compelling to listen to Quinton. I remember wondering if I was even helping him!" Lucas was inspired to study law because he spontaneously typed his name into Google Search and discovered his own paternity case.

As an undergraduate, he studied in Cape Town, South Africa, where he observed the political and cultural legacy of apartheid, especially as experienced by all of his classmates. This experience reportedly changed his perspective, influencing his understanding of inequalities and his path toward public service.

He attended Cornell Law School, where his classmates voted him 2009 Law School commencement speaker and the faculty committee awarded him the 2009 Kelly Prize. The Associate Dean said they chose him among many "excellent nominations" because of his outstanding personality and service to community and classmates, because of his leadership in the Cornell Law Students Association and as Moot Court chancellor, and because of his work with the Death Penalty Project. He was an editor of the Cornell Law Review and graduated with a Juris Doctor.

== Career ==
=== Early career ===
After graduating from law school, Lucas served as a law clerk for Judge Duane Benton on the U.S. Court of Appeals for the Eighth Circuit. He then returned to Kansas City to work in private practice as a commercial litigation attorney with the firm Rouse Hendricks German May. He concurrently volunteered as a constitutional law instructor to inmates at the Kansas State Penitentiary in Lansing.

In 2012, while working as a lawyer, the University of Kansas School of Law hired him as a visiting assistant professor, its first in over 30 years. In 2015, he was elected to the City Council of Kansas City, representing the 3rd district-at-large. He continued teaching at KU throughout his term on the council and as mayor.

=== Kansas City Council ===
In 2015, Lucas ran for the Kansas City Council from the 3rd district at-large seat. Attempting politics significantly risked his established academic career, possibly losing up to 40% of his $115,000 annual private salary. He received 51.8% of primary votes and defeated Stephan Gordon in the general election with 73.8% of the vote. He was sworn into office on August 1, 2015.

While in office, he continued as KU professor, eventually earning tenure. He served as Vice Chair of the Finance, Governance, and Public Safety Committee. He championed a roughly $800 million infrastructure repair plan and backed improvements to the Kansas City International Airport single-terminal project. He advocated for easier pathways to development in Kansas City’s low-income East Side.

He was a vocal critic of a taxpayer‑subsidized downtown convention hotel project, dismissing its construction as "overbuilt" and challenging its incentive structure. In 2016, his ordinance capped tax abatements citywide at 75% and included exemptions for redevelopment in economically distressed neighborhoods. He worked on affordable housing policies and efforts to reduce homelessness, sponsoring a housing trust fund and defining "rent affordability" in city ordinances. In 2017, he spearheaded the initiative to limit or end property-tax incentives (TIFs) in the Crossroads Arts District as part of a broader campaign to reform development subsidies.

=== Mayor of Kansas City ===
==== 2019 election ====
Lucas declared his candidacy for Mayor of Kansas City in the 2019 election. His campaign focused on crime reduction, affordable housing, and improved city services. In the April 2019 primary, he placed second out of 11, with 18.5% of the vote behind Jolie Justus at 22.9%. The general election campaign emphasized policy differences; Lucas focused on violent crime and neighborhood economic development over large downtown projects. On June 18, 2019, Lucas defeated Justus with 58.6% of the vote to Justus's 41.4%.

He was sworn in as the 55th mayor on August 1, 2019, becoming Kansas City's third African-American mayor and its youngest since 1855.

His KU law students considered themselves "lucky" for the unique experience of being taught by a sitting mayor, which gave them direct insight and career path into municipal government.

==== Tenure ====
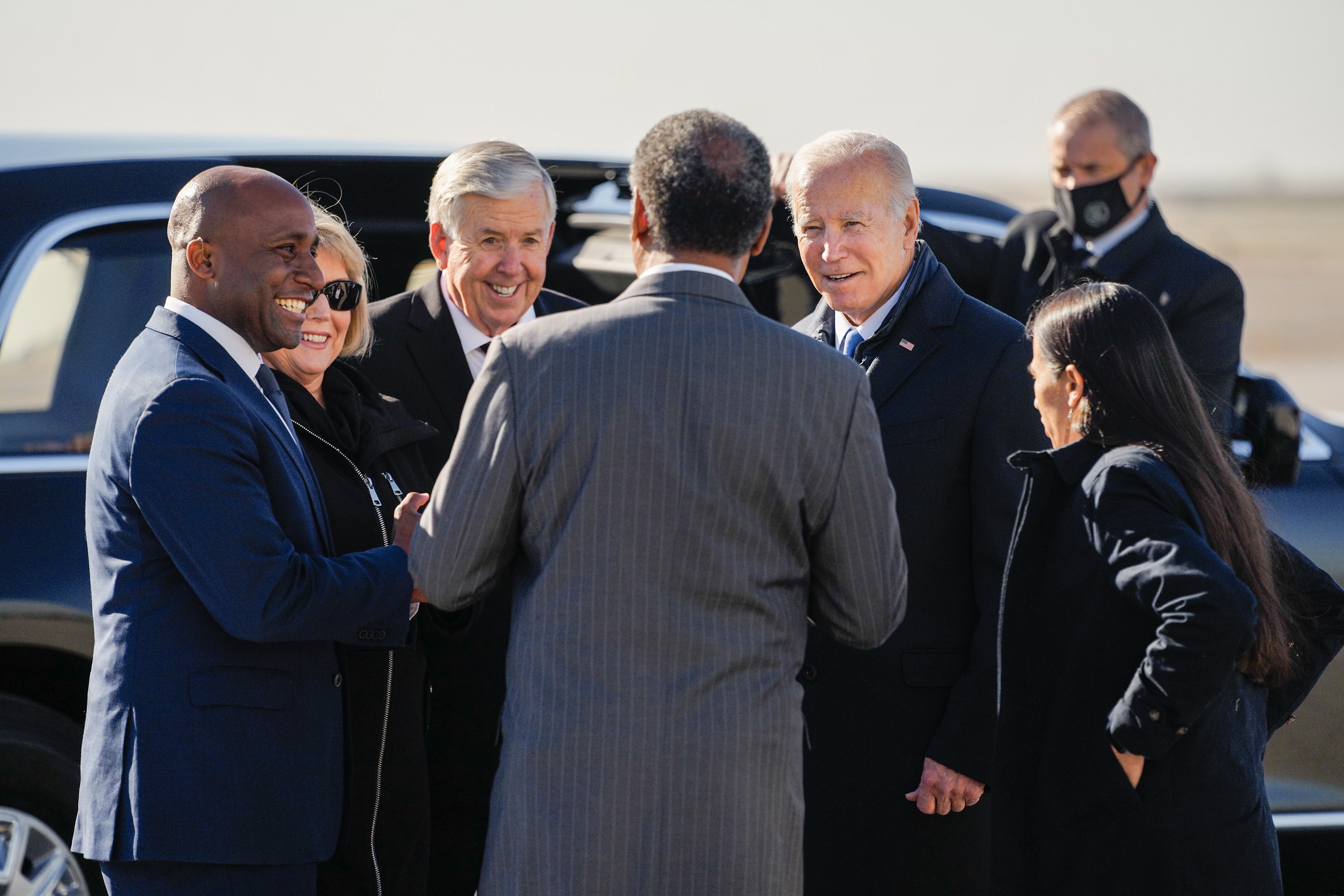
On December 8, 2021, Air Force One landed at Kansas City International Airport, with a greeting party of Mayor Quinton Lucas, Missouri First Lady Teresa Parson, Missouri Governor Mike Parson, U.S. Representative Emanuel Cleaver, U.S. President Joe Biden, and U.S. Representative Sharice Davids.

In early 2020, Mayor Lucas announced a comprehensive plan to address violence as his top priority which included initiatives for community engagement, mental health services, and targeted law enforcement efforts. He has focused on housing and development, advocating for policies to increase affordable housing options and has worked on initiatives to spur development in underserved areas of the city. During the COVID-19 pandemic, Lucas was supported and criticized for implementing various public health measures, including mask mandates, in response to rising case numbers. He worked with federal and local officials to secure resources for testing and economic relief. In 2020, he supported a measure to provide legal counsel for tenants facing eviction.

In 2020, he joined the effort to successfully remove the name of the late J. C. Nichols from a prominent Kansas City fountain and parkway due to Nichols's historical mandate of racially restrictive covenants in housing. He has been involved in discussions regarding police reform and accountability. In 2020, he supported various reform measures following national protests over the murder of George Floyd. In 2021, he and other city council members supported a measure to amend the city budget to reallocate funds from the Kansas City Police Department's budget to a new community services and prevention fund, leading to legal challenges and debate about local control of the police department, which is state-controlled in Kansas City. A Missouri judge ultimately struck down the 2021 budget reallocation measure. In infrastructure, he has continued to oversee the development of the new single terminal at Kansas City International Airport, which opened in February 2023. He has advocated for improvements to public transportation and road infrastructure throughout the city. In 2023, Lucas supported a successful declaration of Kansas City as a sanctuary (Safe Haven) for people seeking or providing gender-affirming care. He also supported efforts to decriminalize cannabis at the local level prior to statewide legalization in Missouri.

Arts and Sciences at Washington University in St. Louis, summarized this term's accomplishments: "He directed the city manager to highlight any discriminatory language in the city's code of ethics. He worked to remove marijuana violations from the code of ordinances and to create a system in which unpaid parking tickets no longer lead to incarceration – both issues that disproportionately harm poor Kansas Citians." His exposure to South African apartheid had motivated him to report that his tenure exposed the racism in Kansas City's "current DNA", so he publicized his receipt of several racially charged death threats.

==== 2023 election ====
Lucas ran for reelection as mayor in 2023. The opponent, Clay Chastain, has been a frequent candidate for city office. Lucas campaigned on his first-term accomplishments, including the opening of the new KCI terminal, efforts to address violent crime, and investments in infrastructure and affordable housing. In the primary election on April 4, 2023, Lucas received 81.4% of the vote and was reelected in the general election on June 20, 2023, with 80.5% of the vote. His second term began on August 1, 2023.

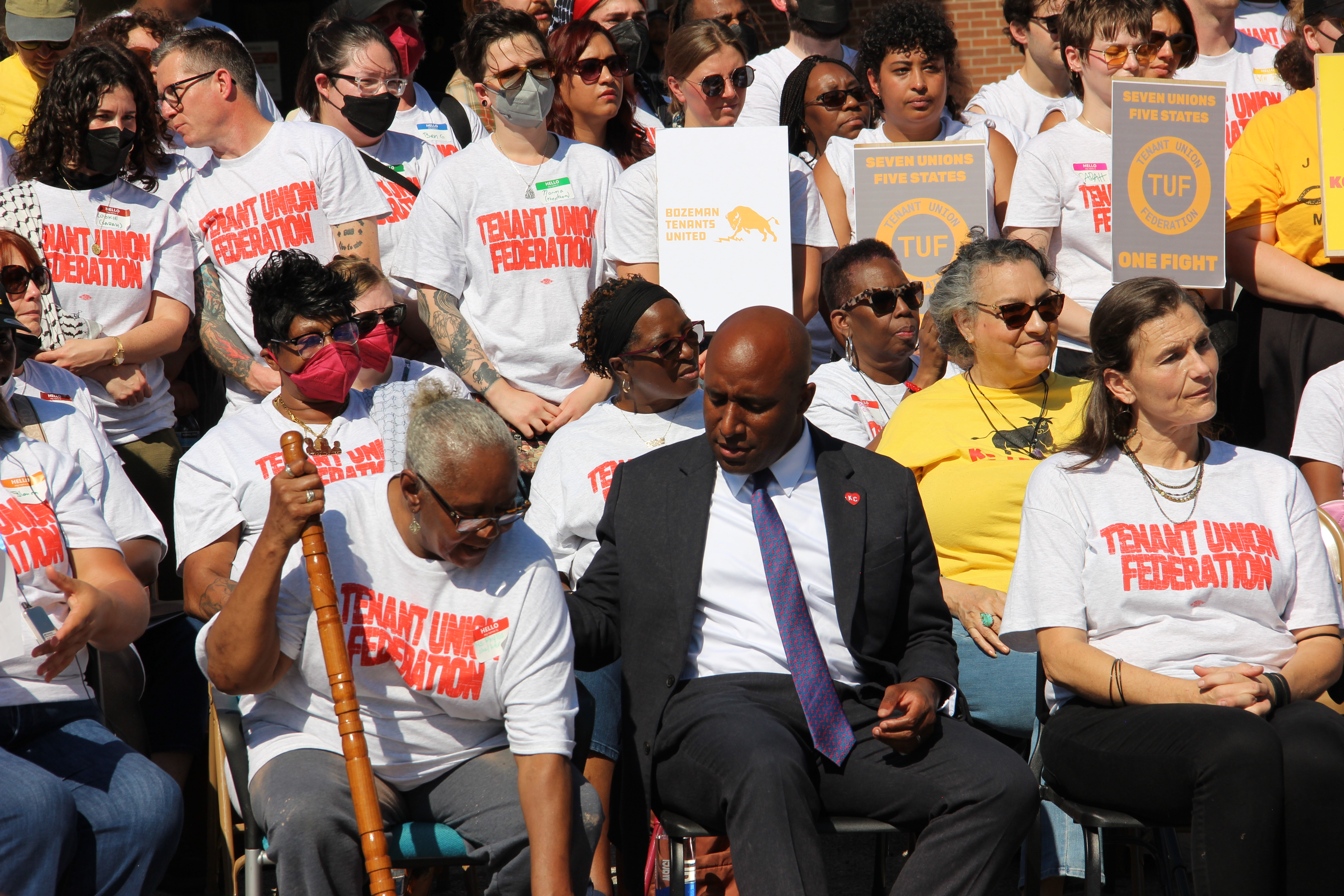
Quinton Lucas joined Tenant Union Federation members at their announcement of a unionization drive against Capital Realty Group.

== Personal life ==
Lucas is a lifelong fan of the Kansas City Chiefs, reportedly taking detailed and colored notes on the performances of Kansas City sports teams. His favorite recipe is Doritos casserole.

On April 9, 2021, he married his longtime partner, Katherine Carttar. They have two children.

== Electoral History ==
Kansas City 3rd District At-Large Special Election, 2015
| Candidate | Votes | % |
|---|---|---|
| Quinton Lucas | 10,646 | 51.39 |
| S. Gordon | 2,305 | 11.13 |
| V. Evans | 2,293 | 11.07 |
| K. Coleman | 1,958 | 9.45 |
| C. Gatlin | 1,940 | 9.36 |
| F. Beasley | 1,402 | 6.77 |
| Total votes | 20,544 | 99.17 |

Kansas City 3rd District At-Large Municipal General Election, 2015
| Candidate | Votes | % | ± |
|---|---|---|---|
| Quinton Lucas | 18506 | 79 | ▲25.61 |
| S. Gordon | 4920 | 21 | ▲9.87 |
| Total votes | 23,426 | 100 | ▲0.83 |

== See also ==
- List of mayors of Kansas City, Missouri
- List of mayors of the 50 largest cities in the United States

Political offices
| Preceded by Sly James | Mayor of Kansas City; 2019–present | Incumbent |
