= Tenant Union Federation =

Federation of tenants' unions in the United States

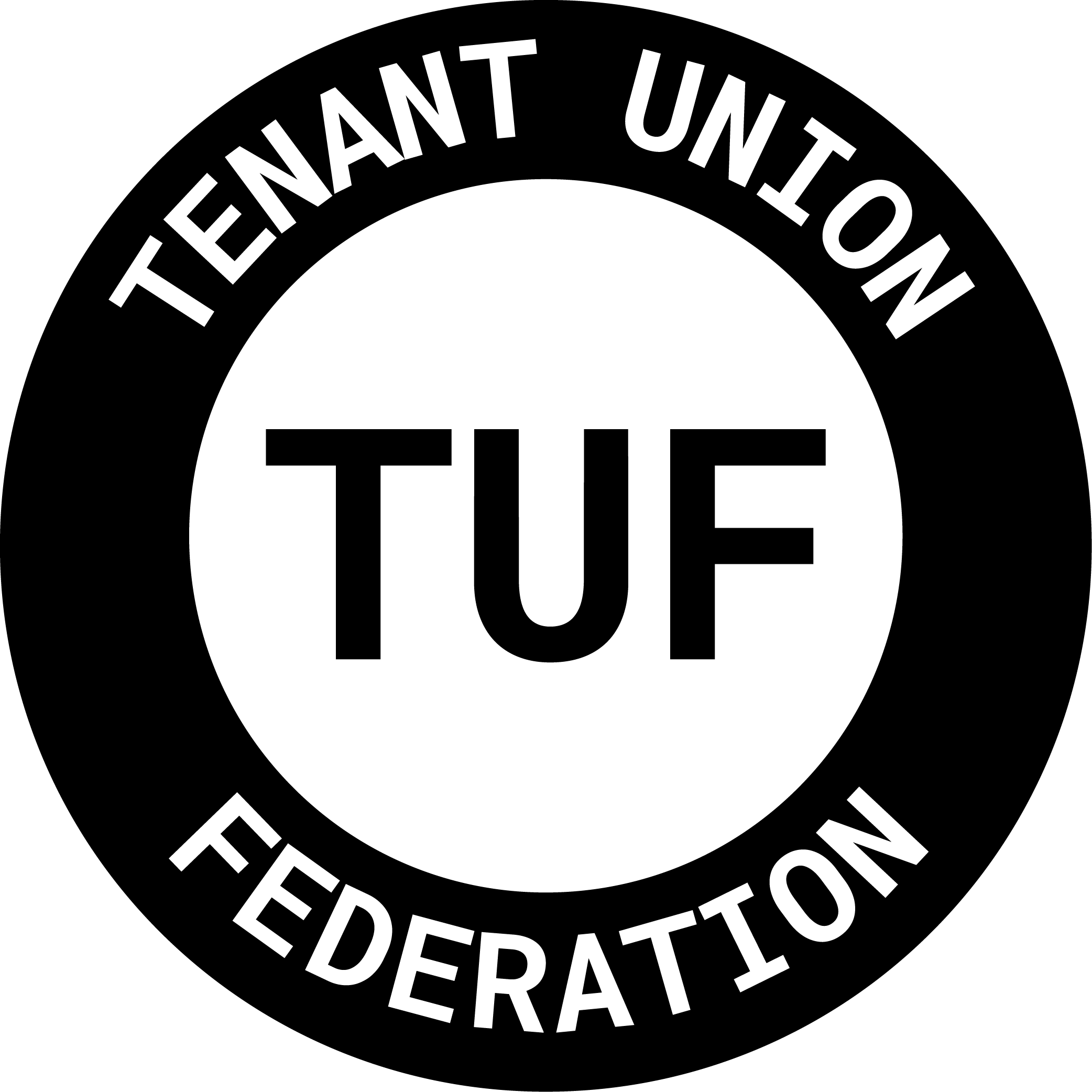
- Abbreviation: TUF
- Formation: August 6, 2024; 2 years ago
- Location: United States
- Director: Tara Raghuveer
- Website: tenantfederation.org

The Tenant Union Federation (TUF) is a national federation of tenants' unions in the United States, describing itself as a "union of unions".

The TUF was founded in 2024 by the Kansas City Tenants Union, Connecticut Tenant Union, Louisville Tenant Union, Bozeman Tenants United and Not Me We.

The Director of the Tenant Union Federation is currently Tara Raghuveer.

== Establishment ==
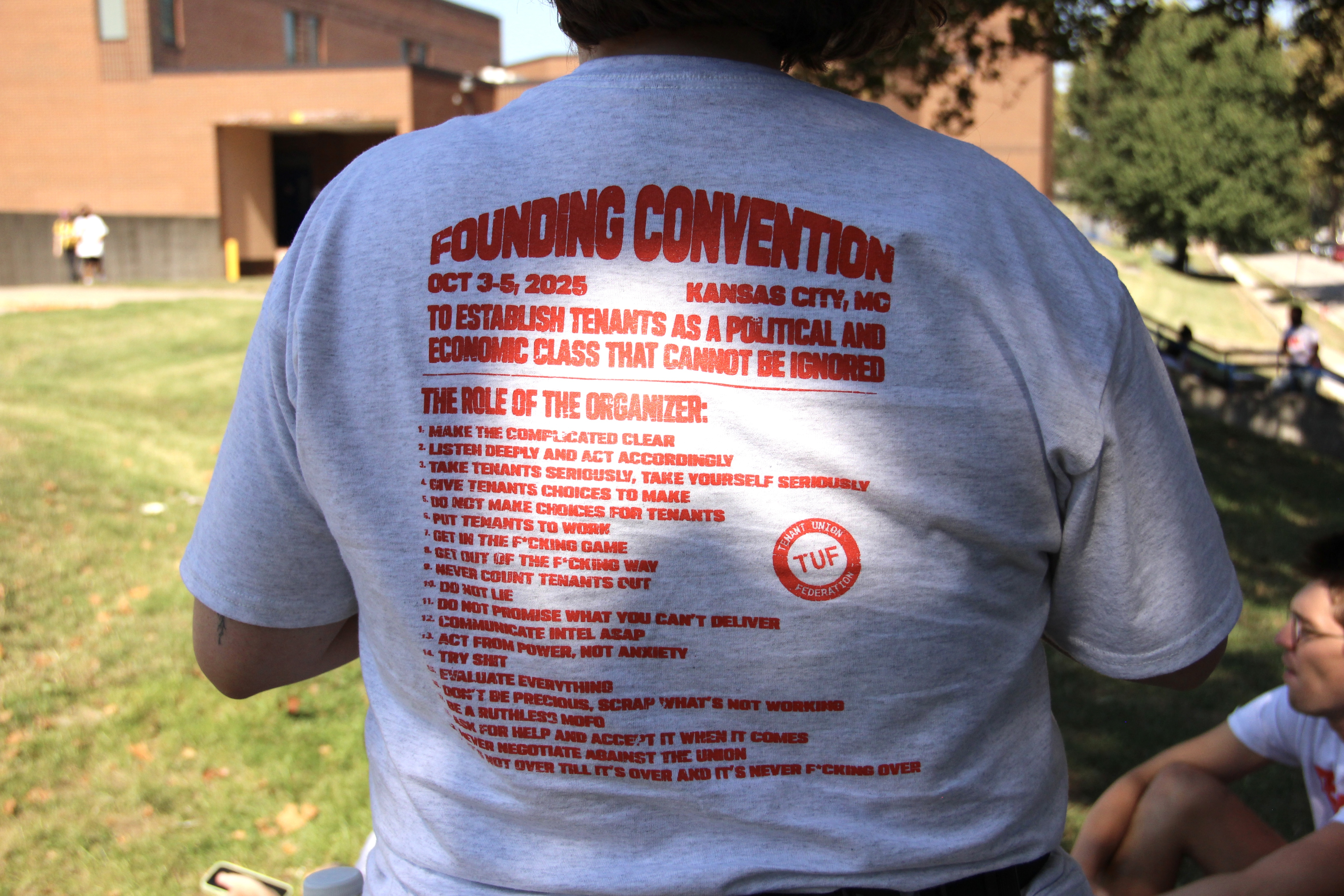
Lawrence Tenants member wears Tenant Union Federation founding t-shirt

The COVID-19 pandemic saw tenants face increased housing insecurity, due to many landlords' hiking rents, as well as an increased threat of eviction during lockdowns and slowed economic activity. This compounded with existing factors, such as high rents and poor housing maintenance by landlords These issues resulted in the formation of new tenants' advocacy organizations in the form of tenants' unions

Some tenants' unions considered that local organizing only within their city area had limits whilst many landlords' property portfolios and political influence span beyond that locality. Responding to this, efforts began in April 2024 to form a national organization between five tenants' unions—Kansas City Tenants Union, Connecticut Tenant Union, Louisville Tenant Union, Bozeman Tenants United and Not Me We. After the members of the five unions voted in favor of forming a federation of the trade unions, in June, the national leadership team of the TUF held its first meeting. The Tenant Union Federation was officially launched in August 2024. The establishment of the TUF marked the largest campaign of tenant unionism since the National Tenants Union of the late 70s and 80s.

Each union sends two representatives to the national leadership team of the TUF. KC Tenants Union representative Tara Raghuveer was chosen as the first Director of the Tenant Union Federation.

Raghuveer has said that the TUF plans to expand the membership of the federation in 2025. In the meantime, the TUF is focused on developing training and support for new tenants' organizations. The TUF also intends to connect with organized labor.

== Tenant union drives ==
TUF member alleges there was unionbusting and retaliation against tenant union members.

TUF supported a unionization drive from August to September of 2025 of properties within Capital Realty Group's rental portfolio.

== See also ==
- 2024 Kansas City metropolitan area rent strike
- ACORN International
- Trade union federation
  - AFL-CIO
  - Strategic Organizing Center
- List of tenant unions in the United States
