= Tenant right to counsel =

Tenant right to counsel (TRTC) is a proposed right that tenants should be provided with free legal representation, especially when tenants face eviction. As of 2023 in the United States, tenants are represented by lawyers in eviction cases 3% of the time, whereas landlords have legal representation in 80% of cases. TRTC is viewed as a form of homelessness prevention, but eviction potentially implicates a number of other basic human needs, such as child custody, education, employment, and physical/mental health. Generally, tenant right to counsel programs have resulted in lower eviction rates, reduced rent arrears, and a sealed eviction records for tenants who cannot or do not want to stay in their homes.

TRTC programs aim to fix imbalances in legal representation between landlords and tenants as opposed to eviction mediation programs that seek to find agreements between largely unrepresented tenants and represented landlords.

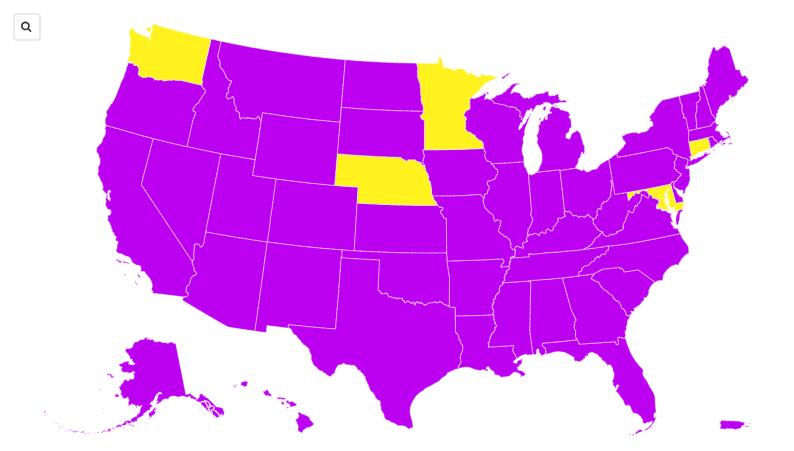
US state legislation on tenant right to counsel (NOTE: does not indicate cities with tenant right to counsel. Territories, except Puerto Rico, are also not included on this map) No statewide TRTC Some statewide TRTC passed

== Around the world ==
=== United Kingdom ===
On 1 August 2023, the Housing Loss Prevention Advice Service launched in England and Wales, providing free legal representation and advice regardless of income for renters and homeowners who are facing illegal eviction, poor housing conditions, and late rent or mortgage payments. The program was expected to assist 38,000 people per year.

=== United States ===
Unlike criminal right to counsel, there is no federal tenant right to counsel. Evictions and landlord-tenant cases are civil cases. The theoretical expansion of right to counsel to civil cases was at one time known as "Civil Gideon," after Gideon v. Wainwright, which established the right to an appointed lawyer in criminal cases for defendants who cannot afford one, but advocates have moved away from that term in favor of "civil right to counsel".

In the US, tenant right to counsel was first passed in New York City in 2017. It has passed in four states and 17 cities as of September 2024, including San Francisco, Kansas City, and Philadelphia.

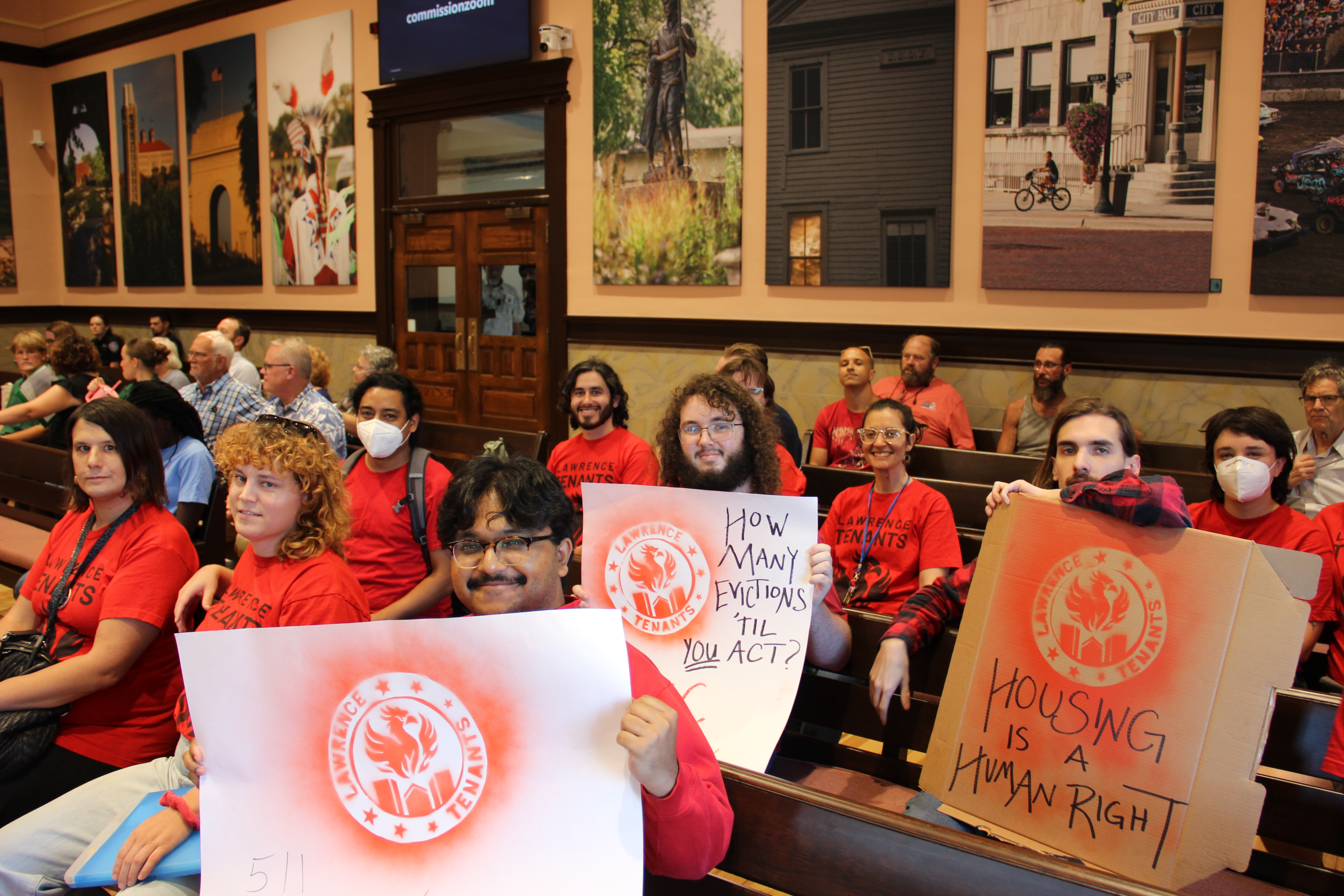
Lawrence Tenants members advocate for tenant right to counsel in Douglas County, Kansas on October 1, 2025.

TRTC is a common goal for tenants unions. KC Tenants, Bozeman Tenants United, Lawrence Tenants, North Carolina Tenants Union, and others have pushed for free legal representation for renters at local and statewide levels.

== Funding ==
Programs are funded in a variety of ways. In the United States, many cities fund TRTC programs through general revenue and federal funds. Other funding sources included developer fees in Jersey City, New Jersey, rental excise taxes in Boulder, Colorado, and United Way funding in Cleveland, Ohio.

Tenant right to counsel programs require adequate and consistent funding. Improper funding has led to case overload, development of triage systems, burnout from participating lawyers, and difficulty in hiring lawyers due to job insecurity.

In NYC, the Department of Social Services spent about $3,200 per household according to one study's estimate.

An independent report from Stout found Oklahoma County and Tulsa County benefitted $6.3 million from a pilot program between 2022 and 2024, estimating a return on investment (ROI) of $4.21 for every dollar invested into the program. The Boston Bar estimated in 2020 a statewide TRTC program would result in an ROI of $2.40. Connecticut's TRTC program saved an estimated $36.6 million, taking in consideration funds not spent on emergency shelter, foster care, Medicaid spending, and other social services spending as a result of the program.

== Administration ==
=== Awareness ===
Awareness of tenant right to counsel programs varies. Some programs require notice by landlords (in leases or with court summons), some rely on tenants knowing their rights, and some hire a tenant educator.

In the United Kingdom, tenants and homeowners can reach the Housing Loss Prevention Advice Service through the internet to find legal aid.

=== Coverage ===
Universal coverage allows no gaps, except where underfunding and corporate criteria occur. The National Low Income Housing Coalition called coverage of all tenants the "gold standard."

Many American municipalities expanded income criteria after initially restricting coverage. Newark's program only covers tenants 200% below the federal poverty level, excluding at least 70% of residents. Some corporate partners, such as Legal Services Corporation, had tenants meet exclusionary criteria that was not delineated in TRTC law.

Counsel is available at different points during the eviction process. Generally, counsel is provided during filing and hearings but may also be provided during the notice or appeals periods.

In NYC, homeowners facing foreclosure also have the right to appointed counsel.

== Impact ==
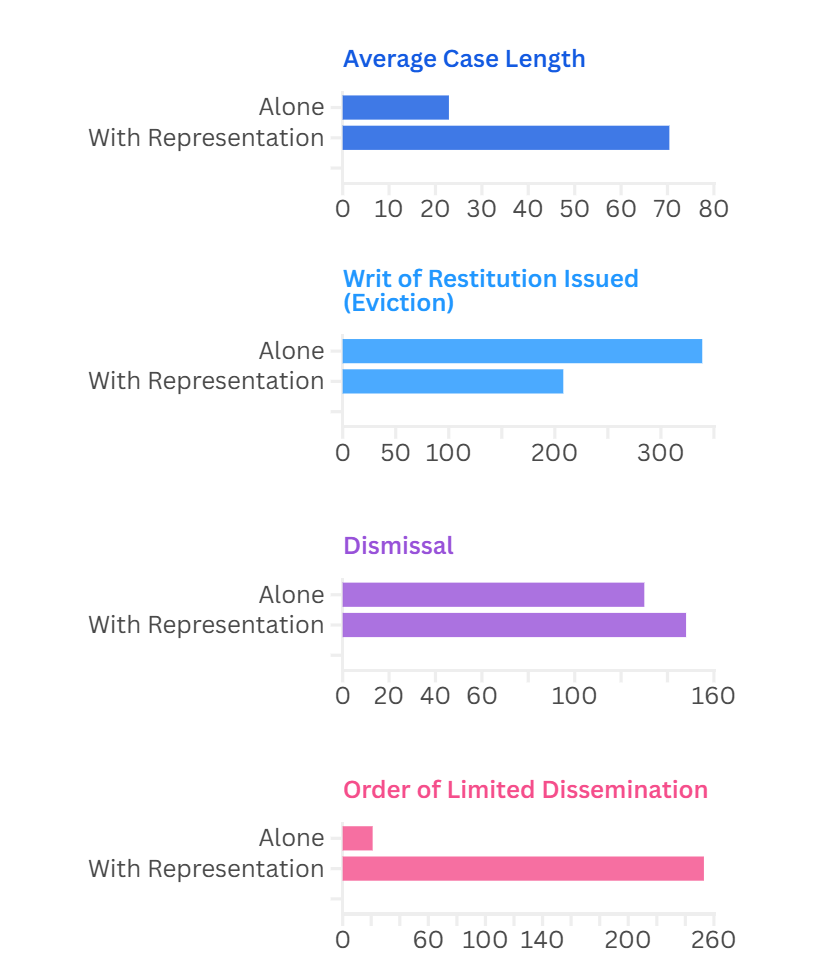
Effects of a tenant right to counsel program in Washington. Orders of limited dissemination prevent evictions from appearing in tenant screening.

The National Coalition for a Civil Right to Counsel has collected tenant right to counsel impact data, including:

- In New York City, 84% of represented tenants stayed in their homes;
- In Maryland, 76% of tenant households provided full representation avoided disruptive displacement, and tenants received more than $415,000 in housing judgments and avoided more than $4.5 million in direct costs
- In Kansas City, 86% of represented tenants stayed in their units with no eviction record.

In cases where tenants cannot or do not want to remain in their homes, legal counsel has extended the length of time the tenants had in their unit while they searched for new housing. In Washington, the average case length for represented tenants was 70.4 days, as opposed to 22.9 days for unrepresented tenants.

Some jurisdictions saw a reduction in racist attitudes toward repeat evictees. TRTC programs have often been seen as a tool in reducing gender and racial gaps in eviction rates.

One study found New York City's TRTC (also known as Universal Access to Counsel) program did not cause rent to rise in a community.

=== Health ===
Access to counsel may reduce psychological stress that arises during eviction procedures. Some tenants found attorneys interacting with their landlords on their behalf to be empowering and gave a "sense of security."

Some tenants' habitability concerns were addressed with representation that they otherwise could not afford.

One study found a statistically significant correlation with TRTC and reduced adverse birth outcomes, such as low birth weight and premature births, among Medicaid recipients. The study suggested each year with TRTC could save up to $50 million in birth-related costs in NYC.

== See also ==
- Right to counsel
- Landlord-tenant law
- Civil rights
