= Louisville Tenants Union =

American left-wing nonprofit organization

- Founded: 2022
- Headquarters: Louisville, Kentucky
- Location: United States
- Key people: Shemaeka Shaw, Jasmine Harris, Josh Poe, and Jessica Bellamy (co-founders)
- Affiliations: Tenant Union Federation
- Website: louisvilletenantsunion.org

Louisville Tenants Union (LTU) is a statewide tenants union based in Louisville, Kentucky, and founded in 2022.

== History ==
After two years of organizing building level campaigns and passing legislation, the LTU formally ratified a constitution and elected a president in 2024. In 2025, the LTU expanded statewide to include rural chapters in eastern and western Kentucky. Major wins include winning well over $1 million in repairs for tenants all over Kentucky, and passing anti-displacement legislation in Louisville. The LTU wrote and passed an anti-displacement ordinance that requires the city of Louisville to review the impact of new residential developments that receive public funds. The ordinance also established the Louisville Metro Anti-Displacement Commission.

Louisville Tenants Union was a co-founder of the Tenant Union Federation, formed in 2024 to push for a national tenants rights platform.

== See also ==
- List of tenant unions in the United States
- Tenant Union Federation
