= 1931–1933 New York City rent strikes =

Series of tenant mobilizations against evictions

1931–33 NYC rent strikes
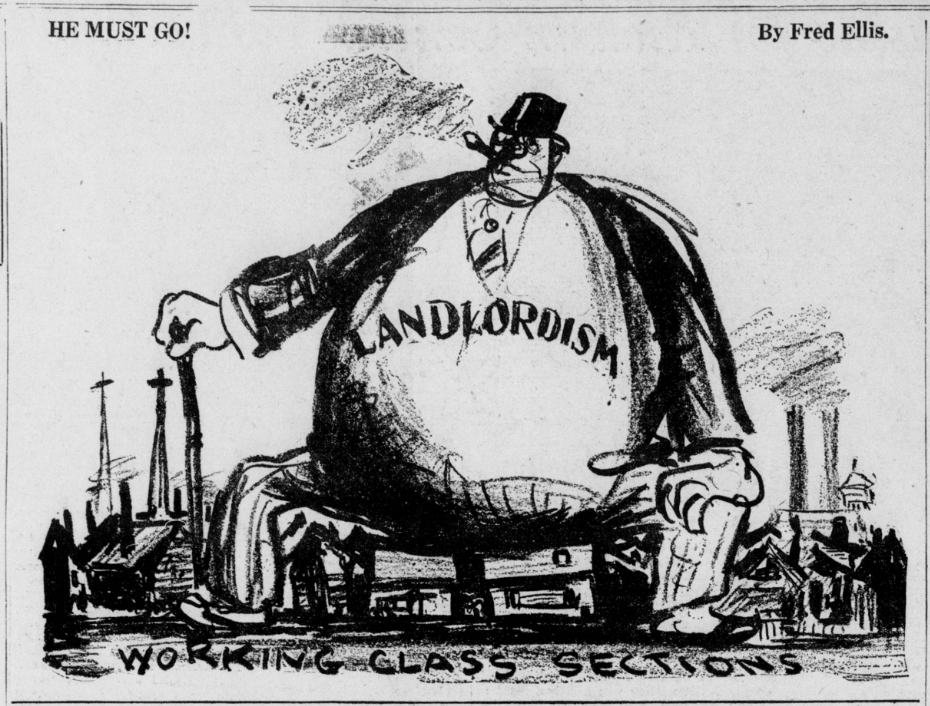
- Date: 1931–33
- Location: New York City
- Methods: Rent strike; Eviction resistance; Picketing; Solidarity actions; Apartment 'boarding'; Neighborhood marches; Home Relief Bureau Sit-ins
- Result: Rent reductions for some; Broad state-funded housing relief

Parties
Harlem Tenants League (HTL); Communist Party USA; Harlem Communist Party; Unemployed Councils	Landlords; Greater New York Taxpayers Association (GNYTA) Bronx Landlords Protective Association: Realtors; Police; Magistrates

Lead figures
Richard B. Moore	

The 1931–33 New York City rent strikes were a series of tenant mobilizations against evictions and for housing relief by tenants of Harlem, Bronx and Brooklyn, sparked in large part by the crisis of the Great Depression alongside the expiration of the Emergency Rent Laws in 1929. Organizing was led primarily by the Communist Party USA Unemployed Councils, with tenants of the United Workers Cooperative playing an important supporting role for strikers.

The strikes led to open conflict between tenants and police attempting eviction. Eviction resistance also developed at this time as a strategy separate from rent strikes. This conflict became more prevalent in 1932, which was followed by a widespread crackdown. To which the Communist Party would change their tactics, focusing on organizing sit-in's of Home Relief Bureaus to demand rent relief but also having greater coordination of affiliated organization to support the rent strikes, and employing neighborhood marches of striking tenants, which furthered their scope and effectiveness.

This was then met with an even greater crackdown with the implementation of criminal conspiracy charges against strikers, that eventually broke any expansion of rent strikes. However, the sit-in's of Home Relief Bureau's continued and proved effective at ameliorating the rent crisis for tenants, while the roll out of New Deal projects began addressing the immediate unemployment crisis. In addition the eviction resistance tactics also continued and still proved effective. The strikes would also establish a broader base of legislative organizing around housing issues.

== Background ==
=== Harlem tenants league ===
The very beginning roots of the rent strikes would have their base among black NYC tenants. On February, 1928 Richard B. Moore with other Harlem and Washington Heights residents would form the Harlem Tenants League (HTL). Moore had held an impassioned speech at a meeting of the Washington Heights Tenants League, formed during the 1918–1920 NYC rent strikes, where he talked of the specific discrimination Black tenants faced, and then was elected as the president of the newly formed HTL. Moore heavily criticized how segregation made black tenants especially vulnerable to exploitation by landlords, and criticized the complicity of white and black landlords:

"the capitalist system which segregates Negro workers into Jim-crow districts makes these doubly exploited black workers the special prey of the greedy rent-gougers. Black and White landlords and real estate agents take advantage of this segregation to squeeze the last nickel out of the Negro working class who are penned into the 'black ghetto'.”

Black NYC tenants did not face the same relief from housing prices that their white counterparts received after the 1918–1920 NYC rent strikes due to the increase of housing construction in the city. The residential segregation black residents were subject to limited their housing supply, and black neighborhoods on par did not experience this same uptick in housing construction. Harlem for example had no buildings built between 1920–24 and only a few after 1924. In Manhattan from 1919 to 1926, black tenants’ rents increased from $21.64 to $41.77/month, according to the Commission of Housing and Regional Planning. On the situation in the Fall of 1928 Moore stated,

“unable to move out of these miserable Ghettoes, the Negro masses are forced to pay the most exorbitant and outrageous rents for houses in every state of dilapidation and lack of sanitation.”

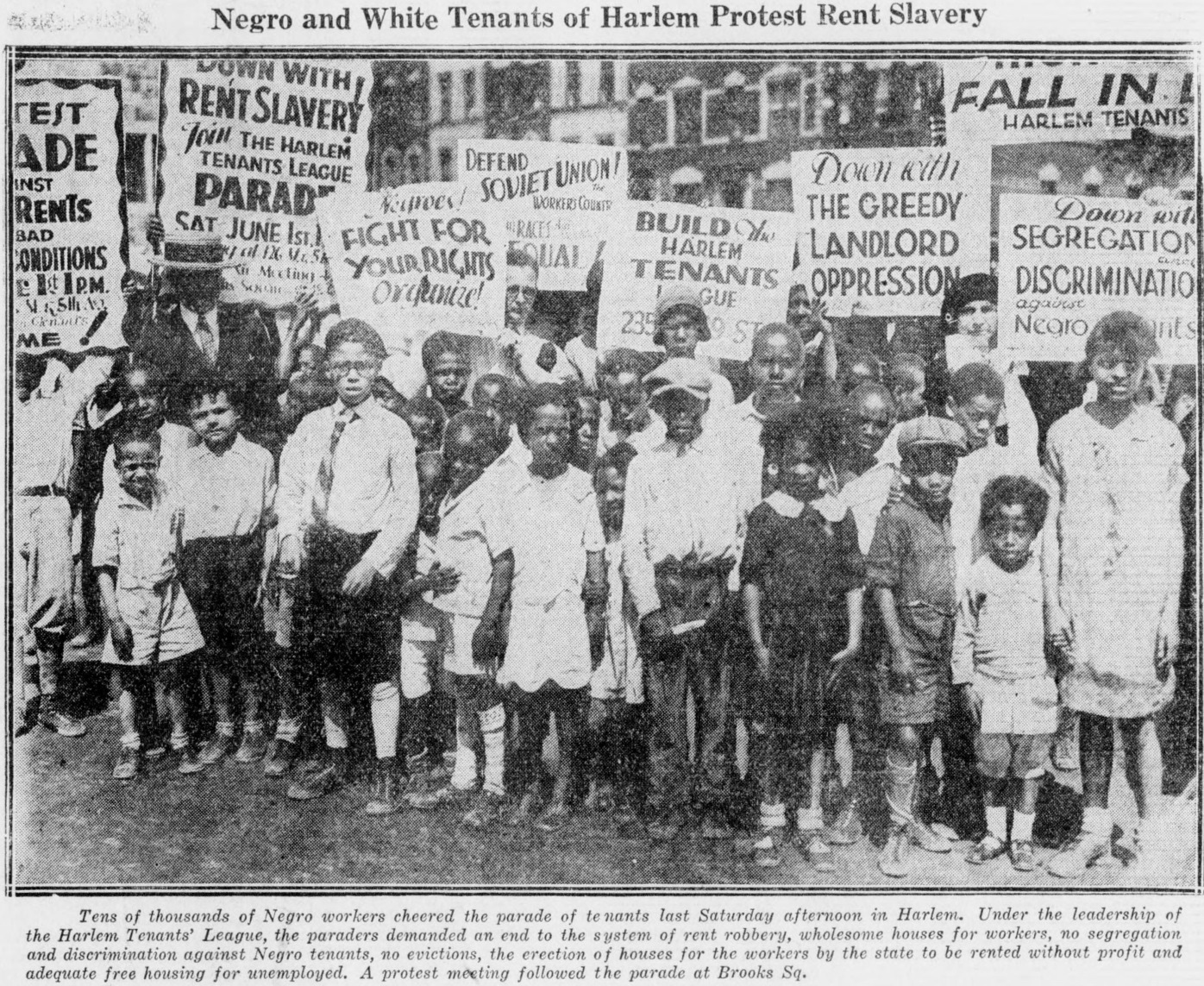
June 1, 1929 protest by the Harlem Tenants League

As the June 1, 1929 expiration of the Emergency Rent Laws approached Moore, Grace Campbell and other members of the HTL began organizing tenants in preparation. Hours after the Emergency Rent Laws' expiration, the league held a parade protest throughout Harlem alongside the Communist Party, the United Council of Working Class Housewives, the American Negro Labor Congress, and the Longshoremen's Union.

The HTL tried to persuade tenants to strike when negotiations failed; And claimed they did take place on an intermittent basis, however non-communist sources do not provide evidence for this.

The HTL also publicized specific demands to address the housing problem,

The program of the Workers (Communist) Party on housing demands:
1. Abolition of all laws which result in segregation of Negroes. Abolition of all Jim Crow laws. The law shall forbid all discrimination against Negroes in selling or renting houses.
2. Municipal fixing of low rents for workers. Rent for wage earners should not amount to more than 10 per cent of their wages.
3. Municipally built houses should be rented to the workers without profit.
4. Immediate enactment of state laws providing for abolition of the right of eviction by landlords against wage earner tenants.
5. Compulsory repair by the landlords of all working class homes in bad condition.
6. Immediate establishment by municipalities of homes to shelter the unemployed.
7. Municipal aid to workers building cooperatives

James S. Allen of the Communist Party would criticize the often uselessness of the Tenement law, which required Old law tenement buildings to be updated, not condemned. Claiming they were unenforced as they were “passed by a capitalist legislature controlled by the landlords, real estate men and others of that kind... so you see that segregation in housing is a matter of dollars for the landlords, just as it is for the bosses of factories, and a barbed-wire fence for the Negro workers, catching and tearing the flesh."

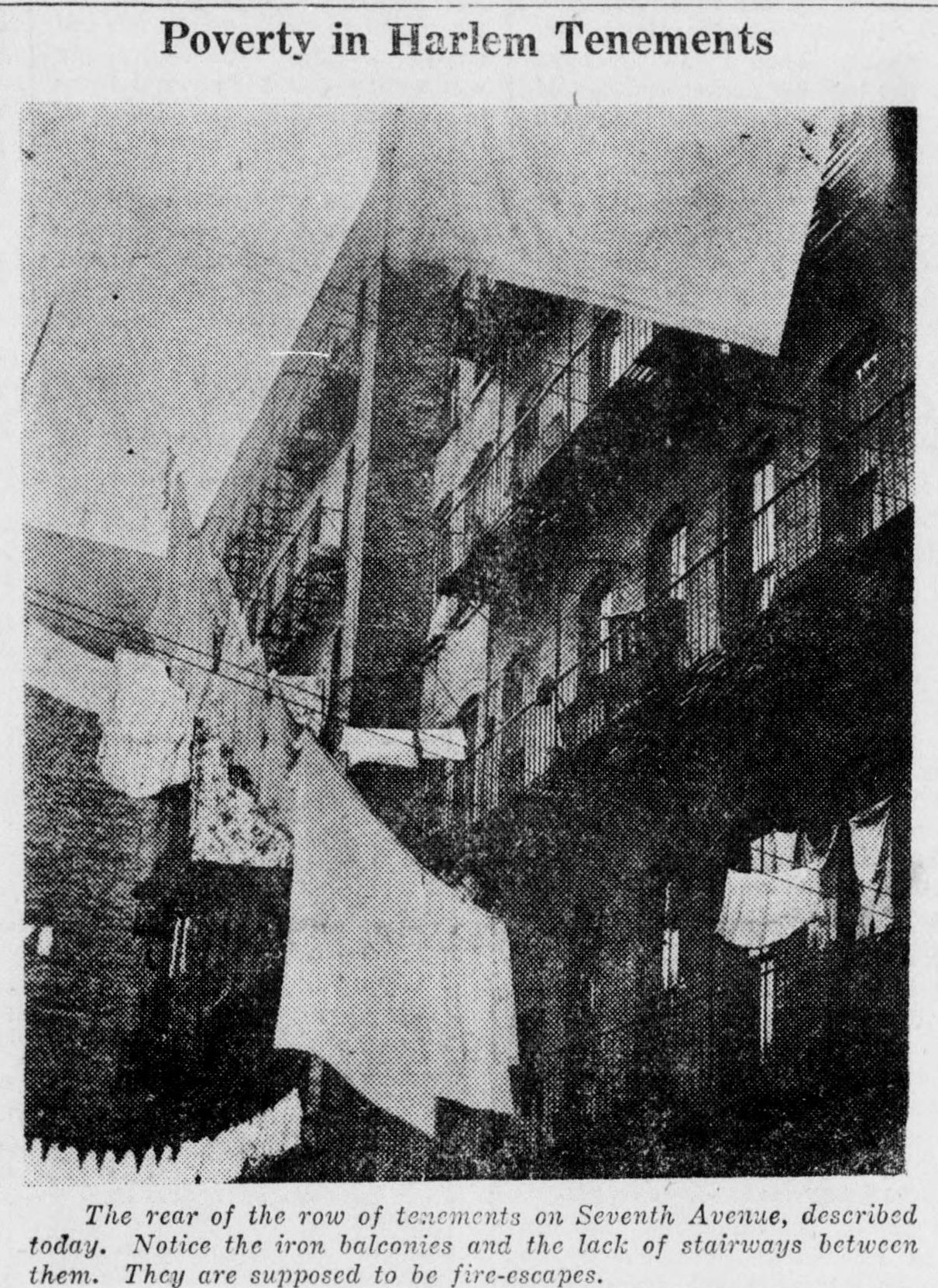
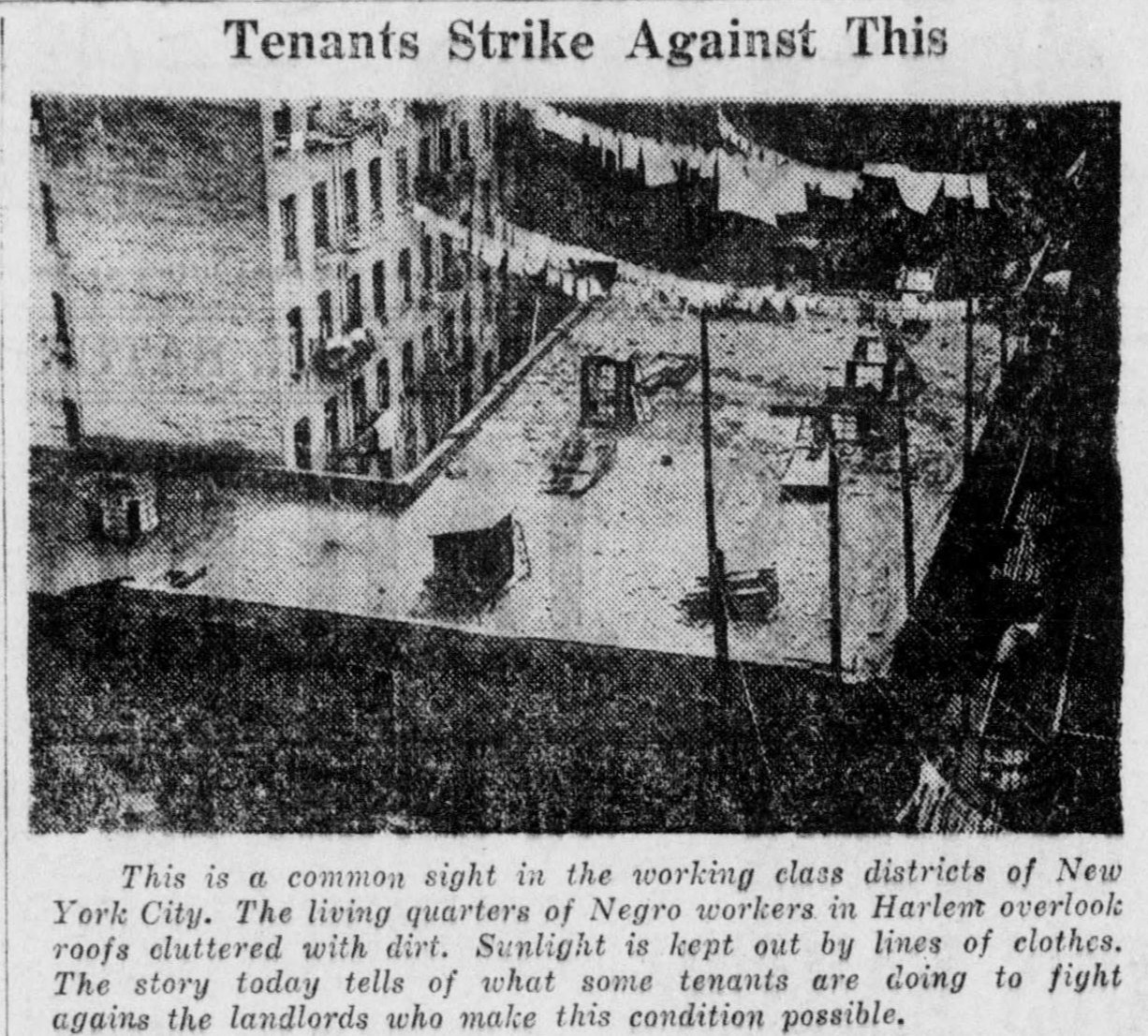
James S. Allen's, Daily Worker articles on the housing conditions in Harlem

The HTL and other Harlemite groups lead a 'vote black' campaign on the basis it was necessary for Black Harlemites to have their issues represented. This campaign lead to the election of Harlem Assemblymen Lamar Perkins and Francis E. Rivers; Who passed the Perkins Bill which gave tenants the ability to apply for a stay of eviction up to six months if the tenant was unable to find comparable housing, when faced with a raise of rent. While River's Bill allowed the court to stay a summary proceeding for nonpayment, if the tenant could show evidence of the Multiple Dwelling Law or Health Department Code. Both giving a small amount of extra protection.

Another way that Black residents of dealt with the rent burden in Harlem, and later the double burden of the Great Depression, were rent parties; Where a resident held a house party with music and festivities to raise money to pay their rent. In one example in 1929, guest would be expected pay 25¢ (equivalent to $5 in 2025) to attend. These parties played a major role in the development of jazz and blues music, alongside forms of swing dancing, deeply intertwining with the Harlem Renaissance.

During the Fall of 1929, factional conflicts in the Communist Party USA and the Comintern would end disrupting the Harlem Tenants League. A group of US Communist Party members, notably Jay Lovestone and Harlem activist Edward Welsh, were expelled from the Comintern for resisting their method of dissolving factions in the US party. The members then attempted to rally the US Party to appeal to the Comintern party to reverse this decision. In response the Comintern ordered the US Party to drive them out of all organizations the party had influence in, a decision which ended up wreaking havoc in the HTL.

Richard Moore would follow the orders to drive Welsh out of the HTL, an action which upset many in the League including Grace Campbell. By the end of October 1929 the group had split into two both calling themselves the HTL, and their tenant base was largely destroyed with them becoming inactive.

Up through the spring of 1930, the HTLs and Daily Worker maintained a strong presence in the housing campaign, however the HTLs failed to build a sustained movement in Harlem.

=== The Great Depression ===
The Great Depression would be the catalyst that sparked the 1931-33 NYC rent strikes. As unemployment rapidly spread tenants in New York City, and elsewhere, struggled to pay rent on a wide scale. In addition it caused the private construction industry to be instantly unprofitable even for luxury buildings. Tenant-landlord relations became incredibly strained overnight, with disposes notices by landlords skyrocketing. Many tenants moved in with family or became the homeless that lived in Hoovervilles. During the first three years of the great depression, the city's vacancy rose to over 9% in the Bronx and parts of Brooklyn, and over 15% in certain low-income neighborhoods.

The tenant organizations formed during the 1920s had since become more conservative in their strategies over time, as such they had no strategy to organize tenants in this crisis. Instead the Communist Party would take the mantle of tenant activism in the city. To their advantage was a group of experienced organizers and a willingness to break the law for strategic reasons.

The Communist Party led Unemployed Councils would begin its campaign in the Fall of 1930 with eviction resistance and rent strikes.

== Strikes and resistance ==
=== Eviction resistance ===
Starting in the Fall of 1930 the Communist Party led unemployed councils would begin their activities. Eviction resistance showed to be their most effective tool, with organizers moving furniture back into an apartment after a tenant had been forcibly evicted and then appeal to neighbors and passersby to resist any further attempts by marshals or police to repeat the eviction.

This tactic worked as police & marshals already had a level of reluctance to evict, having marginal sympathy in the context of the great depression and already on overextended schedules in the context of the mass evictions occurring. In this context, even a relatively small number of party members could meaningful and significantly gum-up the eviction process. In addition landlords had to pay marshals for the evictions, so eviction resistance meaningfully added to their costs. It bought tenants time and led to a newfound respect for the communist party by the community.

The core of these activities were within the poorest communities of New York City, hit hardest by the depression. Hundreds, maybe even thousands of these actions happened in the city during this period, most without active police confrontations.

=== Rent strikes ===
In the winter of 1931, the Unemployed Councils began their efforts to organize tenant leagues across the cities neighborhoods, with the goal to demand rent reductions proportional to tenant losses in income through rent strikes. This tactic did not spread as quickly as eviction resistance, with seven rent strikes mentions between March 1931 & January 1932 in the Daily Worker, four of which were in the historically impoverished Lower East Side and which was a party stronghold.

Rent strikes meaningfully require far greater organizational capacity and risks on part of the tenants, as such it was slower to develop, but also posed a greater more meaningful economic threat to landlords.

==== The NYC Rent Strike War of 1932 ====
Map of first three buildings on rent strike and the United Workers Cooperative

In early January 1932, rent strikes would begin in the Bronx. (Note: Just east of Bronx Park and west of White Plains Road elevated line) The Upper Bronx Unemployed Council announced rent strikes at three large apartment buildings in Bronx Park East: 1890 Union Port Road, 2302 Olinville Avenue, and 665 Allerton Avenue. With the majority of tenants in the buildings withholding their rent and picketing their buildings to demand a 15% reduction in rent, an end to evictions, repair in apartments and recognition of the tenants committee as an official bargaining agent. All three of these building were closely situated by the United Workers Cooperative (UWC), know obliquely as the 'Commie Coops'. A tenant owned housing cooperative, consisting primarily of Communist Textile United Workers Association members. These member were often militantly radical in their organizing, 'the Coops' consisted primarily of Eastern European Jewish immigrants, most who had originally lived in the slum-like conditions Lower East Side earlier in their life until they had managed to scrap enough to move out into these better housing conditions.

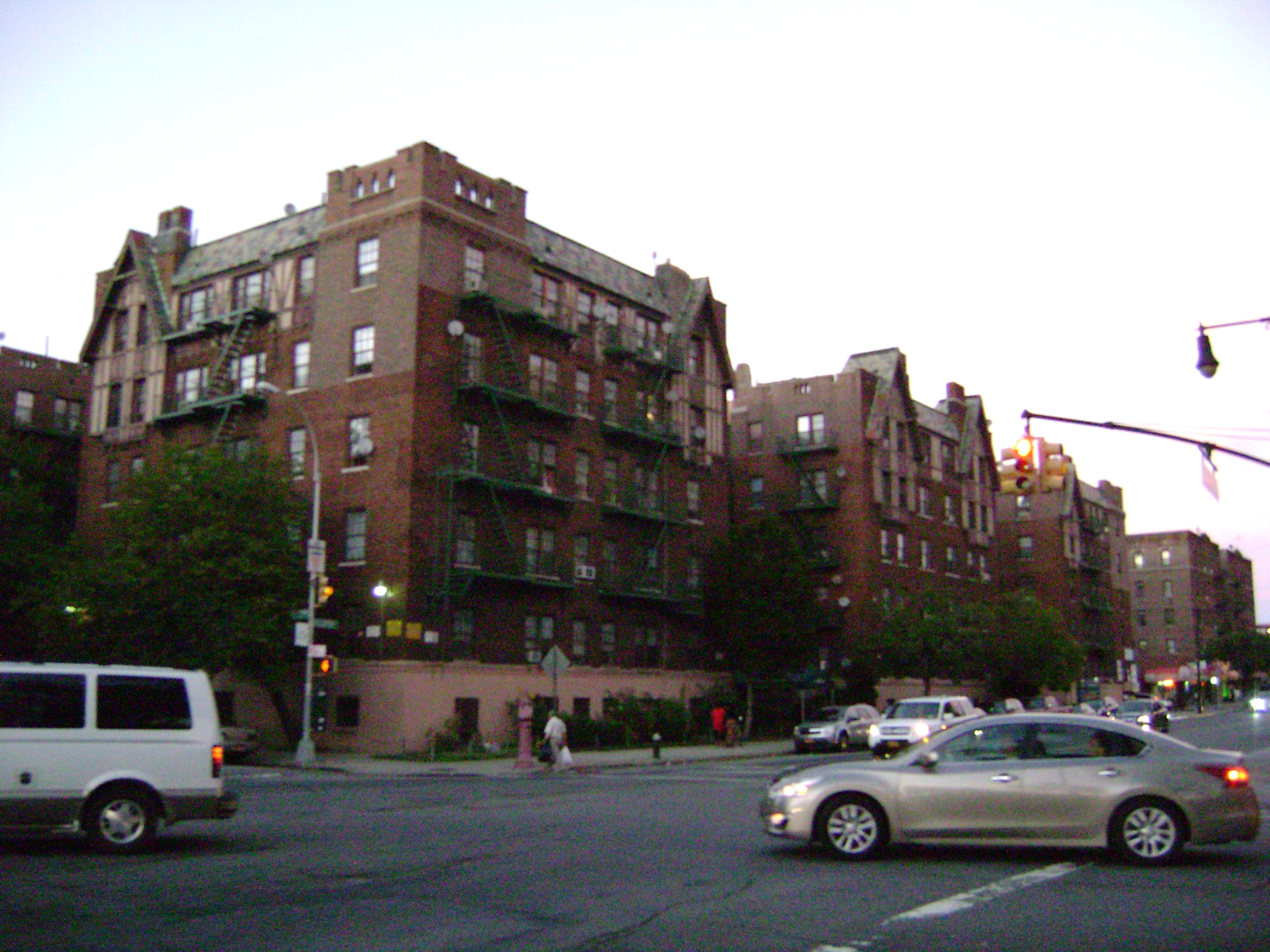
The United Workers Cooperative, 'Commie Coops'. An epicenter of city organizing from the 1920-50s as it was primarily made up of Communist Textile UWA members as residents.

While better off than some in the Great Depression, their upbringing and experience with economic oppression informed residents radical beliefs in both trade unionism and socialism in bettering theirs and others lives. They were determined to not sink back into poverty after being hit with significant loss of income & employment during the great depression, with only a tenuous grasp on middle class status.

The UWC residents played a crucial supporting role during these strikes, picketing with the striking tenants and sometimes fighting cops who attempted evictions of the tenants.

In response to all three declared rent strikes, landlords quickly moved to evict leaders of the rent strikes, which judges readily granted. The first of these attempted evictions would occur at 2302 Olinville Avenue, setting off a "rent riot" of which 4,000 people participated.

As city marshals and police positioned in preparation to evict 17 tenants, a crowd is gathered in the vacant lot next to the building full of supporters of the rent strikers, mainly residents of the UWC. While the rent strikers set to resist from their windows and the buildings roof. Then as marshals started to move in to the build, the first stick of furniture from above landed on the street, and the supporting UWC crowd charged the police and fought them. The UWC crowd nearly overwhelmed the police, until reinforcement arrived. Then the strikers agreed to a compromise offer, a $2–3 (equivalent to $47 to $71 in 2025) reduction in rent and the return of evicted families back to their apartments.

In a 2009 documentary, former residents of the UWC describe their experience supporting the rent strikes,

"and the furniture was sitting out on the sidewalk and this was terrible frighting to me."
"The women, and my mother included, would go up into the apartment, they'd crowd into the apartment so they'd stand shoulder to shoulder so the sheriff deputies could not get in to evict the family."
"I remember yelling at the policemen, they'd laughed and said we came from little Moscow."

Women were the most militant during these fights. This was not unique to the 1931-33 rent strikes, the 1904, 1907, & 1918-20 NYC rent strikes were organized primarily by woman. While division existed in terms of woman being underrepresented in leadership, with a move towards greater leadership representation during the 1918-20 rent strikes; Throughout all woman were core especially to base tenant organizing relying on well established deep community neighborhood connections; and informed partially by opinions over women having ownership over the domestic sphere, that led to less patriarchal opposition to their organizing. Woman were the majority of those in the crowd, the majority of the arrested, and the majority that physically fought with police.

Similarly when evictions were attempted at 665 Allerton Avenue, the eviction of three tenants faced the same militant resistance, fighting openly with police. This time evictions did happen, but only after the involvement of 50 foot and mounted police, alongside a large, expensive crew of marshals and moving men.

===== Coordinated response =====
In response to this resistance, Bronx landlords tried quickly to contain the movement; First through arbitration. Forming a Blue-ribbon committee of Bronx Jewish leaders to arbitrate the dispute. Thinking that showing a landlord could not meet the strikers' demands without operating at a loss would be convincing. However, strike leaders at 665 Allerton rejected this and arbitration, disagreeing fundamentally with a "need for a reasonable return":

"When times were good... the landlords didn't offer to share their profits with us. The landlords made enough money off us when we had it. Now that we haven't got it, the landlords must be satisfied with less.":

— Strike leader, Max Kaimowitz

Given this, landlords decided to a take a more forceful approach. By mid February 1932 two major Bronx landlord organizations had formed rent strike landlord committees, which offered unlimited funding and legal support for any landlord facing a rent strike.

Summarizing, the attitude of many Bronx landlords at the time, one former state senator Benjamin Antin would at the time say to landlords:

"This is a peculiar neighborhood. It is the hot bed of Communism and radicalism. The people in this neighborhood are mostly Communist and Soviet Sympathizers. They do not believe in our form of government."

Landlords also wielded their considerable political influence and legal resources to use a strategy of wholesale eviction notices against striking tenants, to win injunctions against picketing strikers, gain agreements by judges to waive normal delay periods in evictions and attempted ban rent strikes by legislation.

This mobilization would break the 665 Allerton Avenue and 1890 Unionport Road rent strikes. However this didn't stop the movement from spreading to other neighborhoods.

==== Spread of the movement ====
At the same time as the three rent strikes in the Bronx Park East, Communist-led rent strikes for rent reductions began breaking out in Brownsville, Williamsburg, & Boro Park in Brooklyn and further across the Bronx in Crotona Park East, Morrisania, and Melrose.

These neighborhoods were also primarily inhabited by Eastern European Jews like in Bronx Park East, and like it had a dense network of radical cultural & political organization helped set the basis of the tenant organizing. However unlike it they were on average poorer and harder hit by the depression, with which came a greater sense of urgency.

Significant mobilization occurred for building on strike in these poorer neighborhoods, enough to force the massive police mobilization in order to carry out evictions.

One notable example was the five building strike on Longfellow Avenue (Note: Between 174th & 175th) where the Greater New York Taxpayers Association attempted to break the picket and strike. Three separate waves of eviction occurred with active confrontations and fights between police and neighborhood residents, one which involved 3,000 people. The strike was only broken after 40 evictions, an injunction against picketing and many arrests & injuries.

The Daily Worker would describe the complete police mobilization needed to crush the strikes, describing Brownsville

"The police have set up a temporary police station outside one of the buildings... Cops patrol the street all day. The entire territory is under semi-martial law. People are driven around the streets, off the corners and away from the houses."

===== Crackdown, =====
The crackdown by landlords, judges and the police against tenants was fierce. By May 1932 the strength of the strikes had reduced, with the Injunction against rent striker picket playing a significant role. From May to December 1932, Landlords had gained the offensive, with new rent strikes none to rare.

=== New wave of rent strikes ===
The draw-down of strikes would change in December 1932, with a whole new wave far bigger than the last.

First starting in Crotona Park East, the strikes spread to Brownsville, Williamsburg, Boro Park, the Lower East Side and the East Bronx. In February 1933 the Real Estate New states in panic about the situation that, "there are more than 200 buildings in the Borough of the Bronx [on rent strike]... and a considerably greater number in which such disturbances are brewing or in contemplation."

This change in movement was due to a shift in the strategic decisions of the US Communist Party on how to conduct the rent strikes. The Communist organizers expanded their scope and effectiveness of organizing the unemployed; Leading hunger marches, and initiated demonstrations & sit-ins of neighborhood relief bureaus set by the state (Note: (and in part funded by the Federal Emergency Relief Administration)) to dispense direct relief to the unemployed. Communist leader heavily publicized the hardships of the population and continue to push for mass action of the employed, focusing in further on rent and eviction as primary concerns and on emphasized a tool to address it, the rent strike.

The Communist Party mobilized it complete network of organizations to picket rent striking build, organize street rallies and protest marches through striking neighborhoods, which made the movement far more intimidating and effective then the year before. Attempts by landlords to break the rents led to violent street conflicts between police and strike tenant & their neighborhood supporters.

Women especially used the myth of female fragility to protect the men on strike and neutralize police attacks. A tenant activist recalled, "On the day of the evictions we would tell all the men to leave the building" with another stating about the men,

"We knew that the police were rough and would beat them up. It was the women who remained in the apartments, in order to resist. We went out onto the fir escapes and spoke through bullhorns to the crowd gathered below."

On January, 1933 the Daily Worker wrote of the situation, "...a hot fight against high rents and evictions is spreading through the working class sections of New York... The battle is on! Go this morning to the nearest picket line and put up a united front, mass struggle against the greedy landlords of New York." During this period, unlike the earlier 1932 rent strikes, many tenants won substantial reductions by striking and some even merely by threatening to strike.

Of the striking tenants, it was only in neighborhoods with strong communist party organization ties. With the majority of participants being Jewish and some Italians, Slavs and Black Americans. Irish-Americans while a large portion of the NYC working class, were largely absent, mainly dealing with their grievances through their local political clubs rather than leftist organizing.

By the end of January 1933, two major Bronx landlord associations had begun a concerted drive against the rent strikes. With a central fund to pay the mortgages and legal expense of landlords with strikes, the eviction of striking tenants, request for injunctions against picketing and new approaches; Such as requesting criminal conspiracy charges against rent strike leaders, circulating a blacklist of tenants who had participated in the rent strikes, and demanding the mayor office develop a program to suppress the strikes.

In mid February the Bronx Supreme Court would hold two rent strikers on the charges of "criminal conspiracy". Then two weeks later an injunction a separate magistrate on the Bronx supreme court would grant an injunction barring non-tenants from picketing the apartment houses of those on rent strike, with instructions to arrest anyone who did. Then in the last week of March, the New York City Corporation Counsel would issue a ruling making all picketing of apartment houses on rent strike illegal. Actions which significantly dampened the movement.

However, in response the Communist Unemployed Councils would change their tactics, towards the Home Relief Bureau.

=== Draw-down and the Home Relief Bureau ===
In response to the crackdown on the rent strikes, the Unemployed Council began shifting their pressure towards the Home Relief Bureaus. Organizing mass sit-ins by tenants in them until the Bureau would agree to pay their rent. It worked, often forcing them to revoke previous "no rent" orders for those on rent strike.

This included the actions of the Harlem Unemployment Council who organized such sit-ins in Harlem. Demanding that the tenants received aid, and if the officials refused they would camp in the bureau until it was. If police tried to remove them or keep them from entering, then the tactics would become more confrontational and costly for the city. In those cases they would break down bureau doors, overturn desk and chairs before police could arrest them and in some cases even ending with pitched battle with the police, ending in bloodied head and numerous arrest. But ultimately the tactics by the council proved effective.

In early June the Daily Worker would report that nearly 500 rent checks were being issued to unemployed families in the Bronx due to the actions of the Unemployed Council. That same month Mayor O'Brien would issue an order to city marshal to contact the home relief bureau when eviction notices where given and give the tenants time to receive rent aid before any attempted evictions.

With this and the start of the New Deal work relief programs, the unemployed councils would increase shift towards advocates within the relief system, while still serving as watchdogs for tenants. Eviction resistance by the communist organization would still occur, however rent strikes organizations by them became rare.

== Aftermath ==
=== Legislative advocacy ===
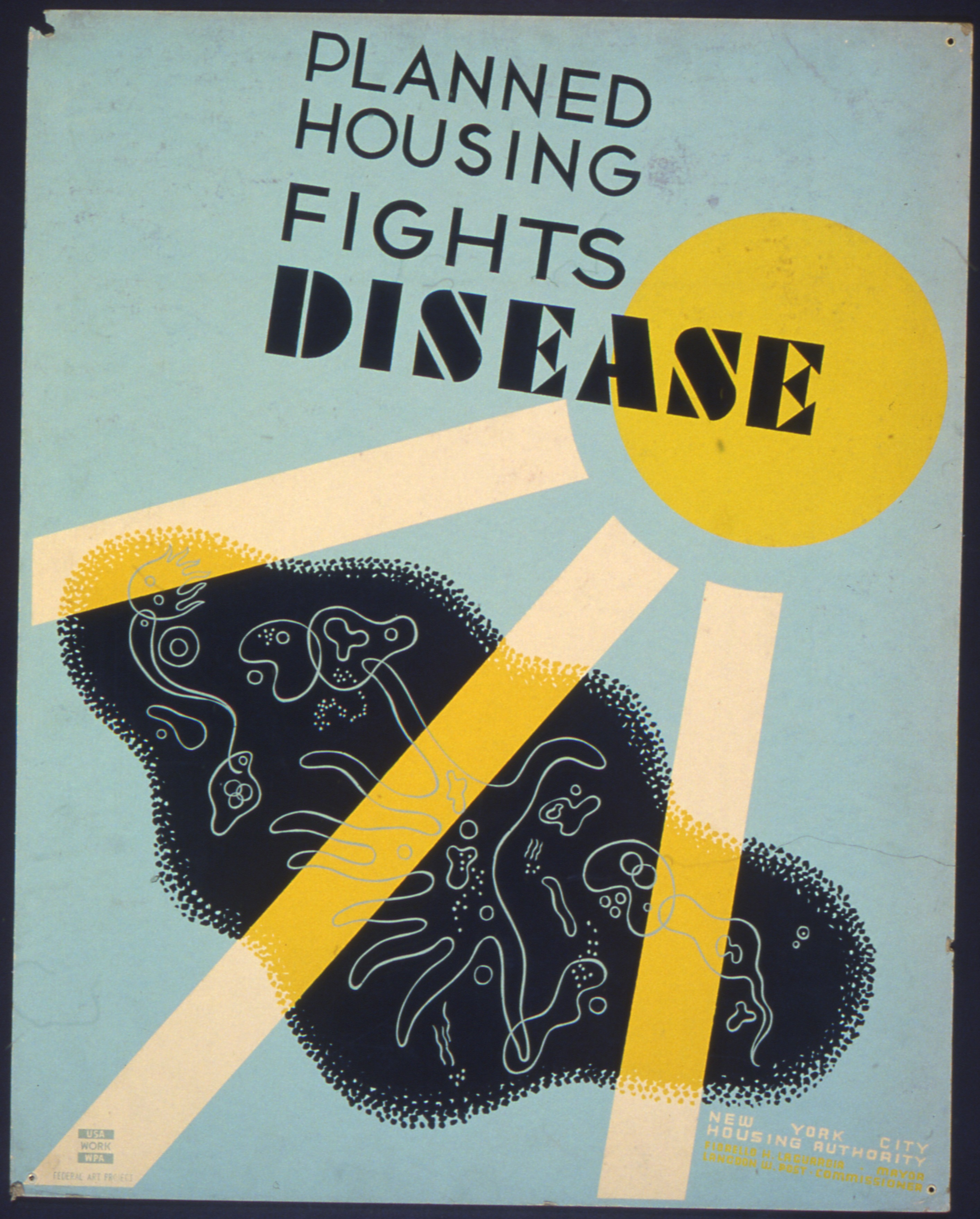
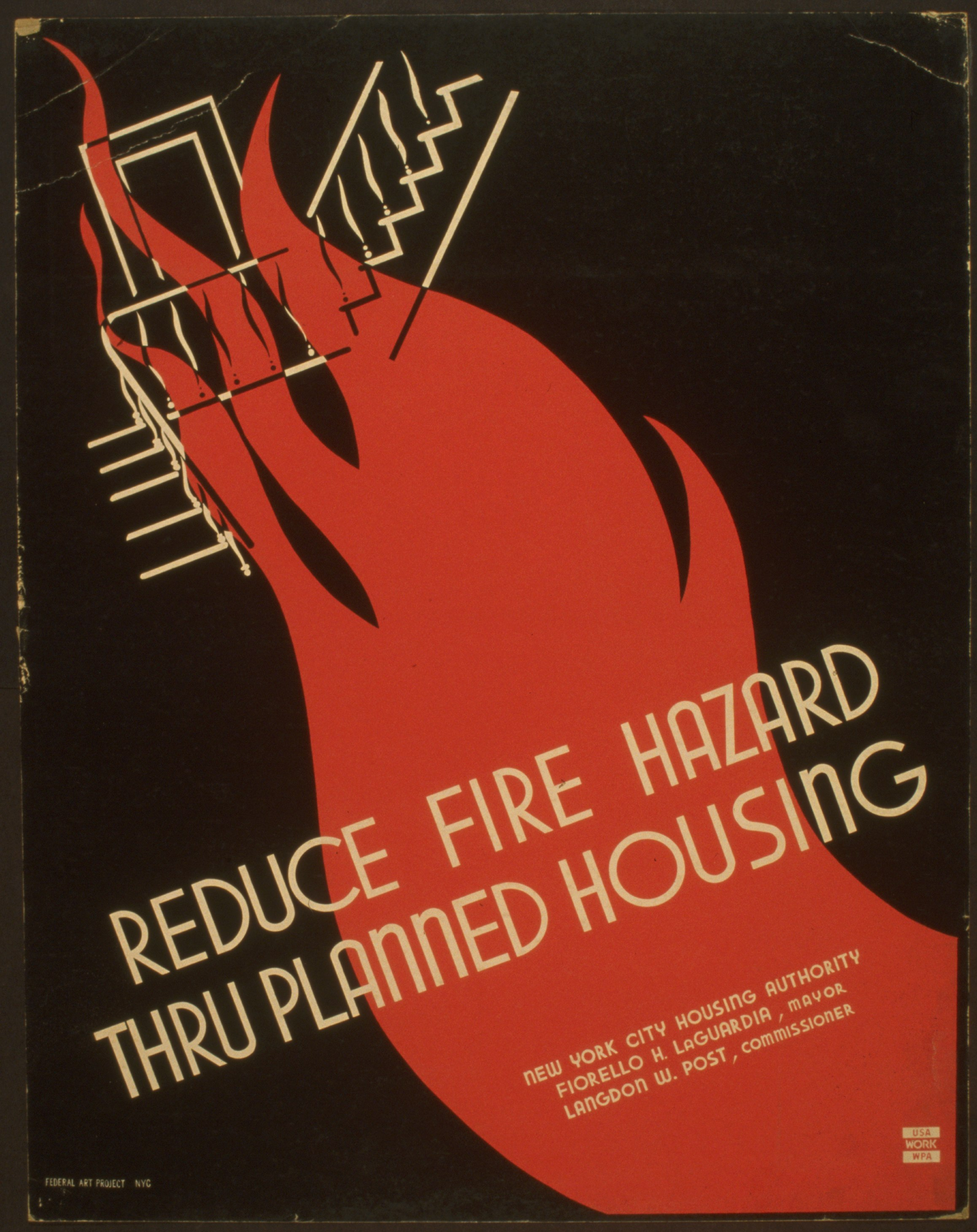
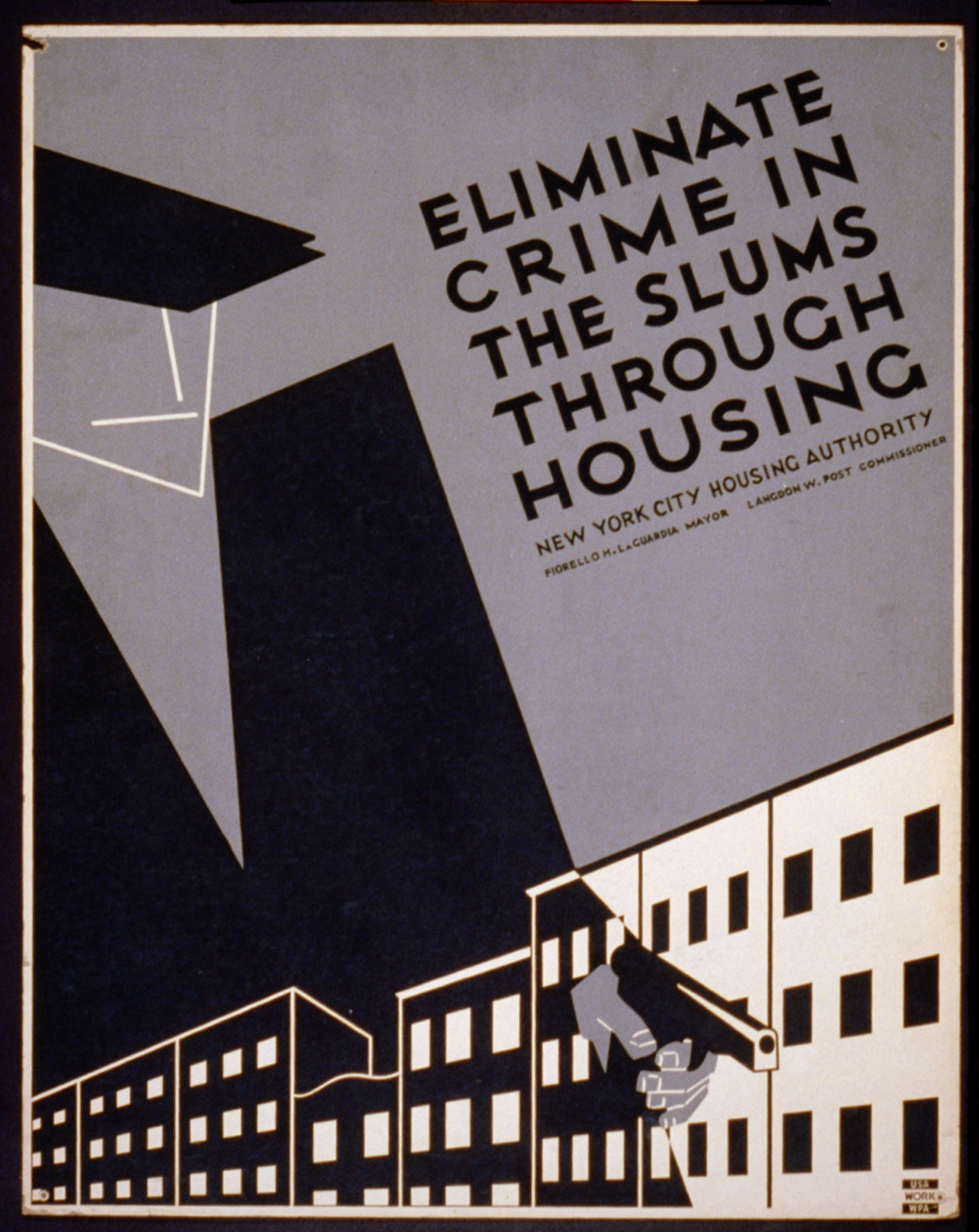
WPA Federal Art Project, NYC Housing Authority between 1936-38

Following the draw-down of the rent strikes, a significant housing reform coalition would emerge in the New York City. Rooted in Settlement houses and philanthropic organization, with a significant base in the administration of the newly elected mayor, Fiorello La Guardia.

One particular issue of these new groups was the inhabitable conditions of the old law tenements, reflective of this was the Lower East Side Public Housing Council, as the Lower East Side had the highest concentration of these types of tenements in the city.

Over this a fight would begin against the 'slum razing' (later 'urban renewal') by the administration from the mid to late 1930s onwards; Pushing tenants out of their apartments through building condemnation without a suitable alternative, instead of instead upgrading and repairing the existing apartments. In particular the destruction and replacement of racially integrated communities with racially segregated (private or public) housing projects or highways.

The Emergency Committee on Tenement Safety successful lobbied for laws to require the fire retarding of hall and stairs within two years, requiring a toilet for every family within two years, prohibiting the use of rooms without windows after January 1, 1939, and conferring broader powers to the Tenement House Department to push for upgrading or demolition of tenements that did not meet minimum health and safety standards.

On the administrative side, La Guardia lobbied for the construction of public housing, and the tenement housing commissioner Langdon Post forced the abandonment of over 1,500 tenements over his first 3 years in office and pushed 1,000s more to upgrade their properties. This change in enforcement, with the forced vacation of buildings, instead of relying on filing violations and lengthy criminal proceeding, led to the 20,000 buildings being equipped with proper fire escapes & fire resistant ceilings. While real estate owned had threatened to wholesale abandon buildings in response, this did not materialize, with the city's stock of old-law tenements more moderately, but substantially, declining from 67,000 in 1934 to 59,000 in 1938, while the yearly deaths in fires in the old-law tenements went from 37 to 6 in that same time period.

However, as of fall 1936 only one low-income public housing project, First Houses, had been built in NYC, with two more under construction.

=== Re-ignition of the rent strike movement ===
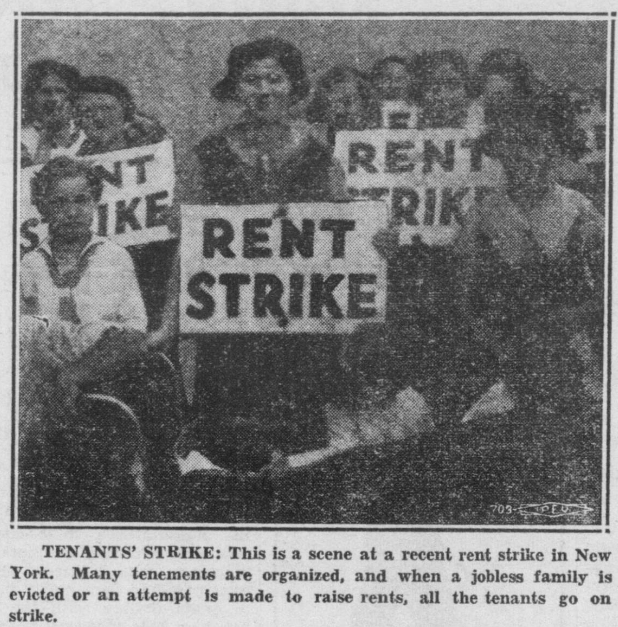
"Tenants' Strike" by the Daily Worker Published June 18, 1934 Date of strike unknown.

Starting in the summer of 1934, two rent strikes would again return, first in Harlem and then Knickerbocker Village. A rent strike before them occurred on March, 1934 on E. Houston Street against the 'Fire Trap' conditions of their apartments.

== See also ==
- Unemployed Councils
