= 1931 Chicago housing protests =

Civil unrest in Chicago, Illinois, USA

- Killing of three, potentially four, black men by police, following an eviction resistance
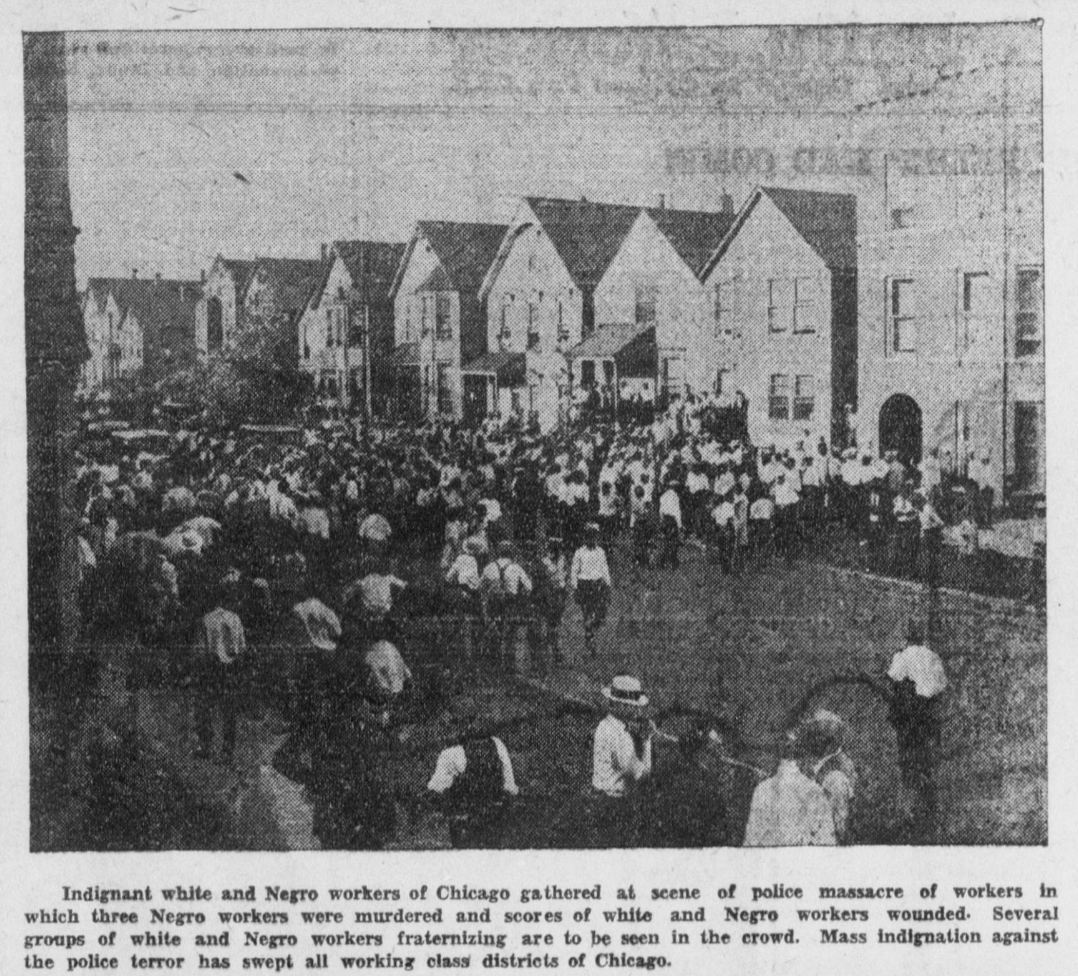
- Date: August 2, 1931 - August 1931
- Location: South Side, Chicago

Parties
Communist Party USA; Unemployed Councils: Chicago tenants	Police; Chicago Realty Board

The 1931 Chicago Housing Protests on the South Side of Chicago in August 1931 began as a clash between white police and African Americans over the eviction of Diana Gross, a seventy-two year old black woman. Police were sent to enforce the eviction and encountered direct conflict with the crowd that had assembled and who were attempting to place her furniture back inside her home. The ensuing confrontation between police and the protesters led to the shooting deaths of two black men during the event, one black man killed later in the aftermath, as well as several injuries to policemen.

== Background ==
=== 1930s Economics ===
The 1930s were a desperate time in the American economy as the Great Depression began to take its toll across the nation. People that were poor or unskilled, immigrants, as well as blacks suffered these effects more than their white counterparts. Rosenzweig argues that these unemployed did not simply "accept their lot" but instead developed strategies for survival such as "formal and informal cooperative movements, family and neighborhood networks of assistance, individual and group looting of supermarkets, coal bootlegging, determined searches for work, and innovative stretching of income."

750,000 Chicago residents were unemployed by 1931. This includes certain workers not getting paid on time such as municipal workers and public school teachers.

During the first two summers after the start of the Great Depression, evictions in large urban cities were not uncommon. These numerous evictions were addressed in Chicago in a "specialized branch of the municipal court, the so-called 'Renter's Court'" By 1931 the non-payment of rent in Chicago had become such a problem that landlords were, while pursuing and threatening evictions, willing to take any help from the courts that would provide them even a partial months rent. It was here that the Communist Party (CP) chose to interject itself as an active participant in the turmoil of the Chicago South Side.

=== American Communist Party and Unemployment Councils ===
The Communist Party faced its own Depression Era problems that left them struggling to remain viable after World War I and the first "Red Scare." In 1929 while most Americans were celebrating Republican prosperity, the Communist Party was in Cleveland organizing a new labor group called the Trade Union Unity League (TUUL) which had as one objective, the setting up of "Councils of Unemployed Workers." Rosenzweig notes that organizational attempts in Chicago were very "visible."

In Chicago there were 2,088 demonstrations by 1934 along with leafleting, eviction protests, and personal contracts which were intended to rebuild the CP's Chicago base. This Communist unemployed movement continued to grow because of the destitute situation that many working poor found themselves in and because of the inability of local relief groups to adequately provide enough support. Because of this growth, by March 1930 the CP in Chicago had the ability to distribute 200,000 leaflets, 50,000 stickers, and 50,000 shop papers in the days before a demonstration.

=== Chicago's South Side Landlords ===
The foundation of future violence in the 1931 eviction crisis lay within the Chicago real estate interest. A representative for the Chicago Realty Board said,

"The real estate men are sympathetic with the situation of the unemployed in the colored belt. We are willing to do what we can to help but it is impossible to compromise with what is strictly a business proposition."

Tenants that were not able to pay their rent and were in the process of applying for relief grew by 311 percent according to the United Charities of Chicago. This attitude coupled with the political atmosphere and court decisions to enforce evictions created a foundation upon which protest and violence could easily erupt.

== The Prelude ==
Randi Storch, a historian and professor at the State University of New York, College at Cortland, tells us that Edith Margo, an eyewitness "reiterated the sequence of events in 1931" in the John Reed Club's publication "Left Front."

=== August 1, 1931 ===
White and black landlords including then Congressmen Oscar Depriest, a wealthy black politician and Chicago landlord met at the W.H Riley real estate office to discuss the issues on the South Side of Chicago regarding non payments of rent. They agreed to insist that the Chicago Chief of Police take their problem more seriously and to take more proactive measures to halt the "anti-eviction" measures of the Unemployed Councils of the CP.

=== Morning of August 3, 1931 ===
By the morning of August 3 the police were ready to move into action. During the early morning hours the police arrested Charles Banks, one of the Unemployed Council leaders, and warned others that "if any of you go out on anymore evictions today your goin' to get drilled." According to Margo, Banks and the other council members took this as an "invitation to battle."

Later, Unemployed Council leaders met in Washington Park, where "people had traditionally gathered to talk, listen, protest, sleep, and occasionally act" to discuss what might be done about Banks's arrest. From this park, in an impromptu way, a large group of people gathered with the intent to march together to protest an eviction occurring that morning on Chicago's South Side.

== The Eviction of Diana Gross ==
Near 51st street and Dearborn, on the morning of August 3, a seventy-two year old black woman named Diana Gross was evicted from her home. Two municipal court bailiffs and a real estate agent had arrived earlier and executed the eviction. As word of the eviction spread "something like two thousand people gathered" in the center of the area according to Abbot & Kiesling.

The size of the crowd differs between accounts ranging from 450 to 4000, but it seems that there was an initial group that was joined by the march from Washington Park. In the march was Abe Grey who was known as one of the best organizers of the CP and who was also ready for a conflict as he was quoted as saying "If there is shooting, I expect to be killed, because I shall be on the front rank."

During the chaotic process of moving household possessions back into the home accompanied by the arrival of the Washington Park group in mass the police began to arrest Council leader Joseph Gardner along with others. As Gardner was being taken away in a police car he noted hearing gunshots. Chicago Communist party leader Bill Gerbert explained in a letter to the national party that "Abe Grey and others had disarmed and beaten three policemen, causing other police to attack and to fatally shoot Grey." Upon being shot, Grey threw a police revolver into the crowd encouraging others to continue fighting.

Edith Margo, an eyewitness, told "a less heroic" story about Grey who having evaded arrest had tried to lead the group after Gardner as he was taken away in the police car. "At one point he had his hand in his pocket which caused the police to jump to the 'conclusion that he had a gun and they shot him five times'" Another black man, John O'neil, who was part of the march from Washington Park took a gun either from a police officer or off of the ground as "a few had been dropped" and tried to fire it. The safety was engaged and while the gun did not go off, a nearby policeman saw him trying to shoot and returned fire killing him. Frank Armstrong, A black friend of Grey was found later that night in Washington Park "shot through the head and badly mutilated" although no one remembers him being killed during the eviction protest earlier that day. CP members later were quoted as saying that "quite evidently he had been taken for a ride by the police."

== Aftermath ==
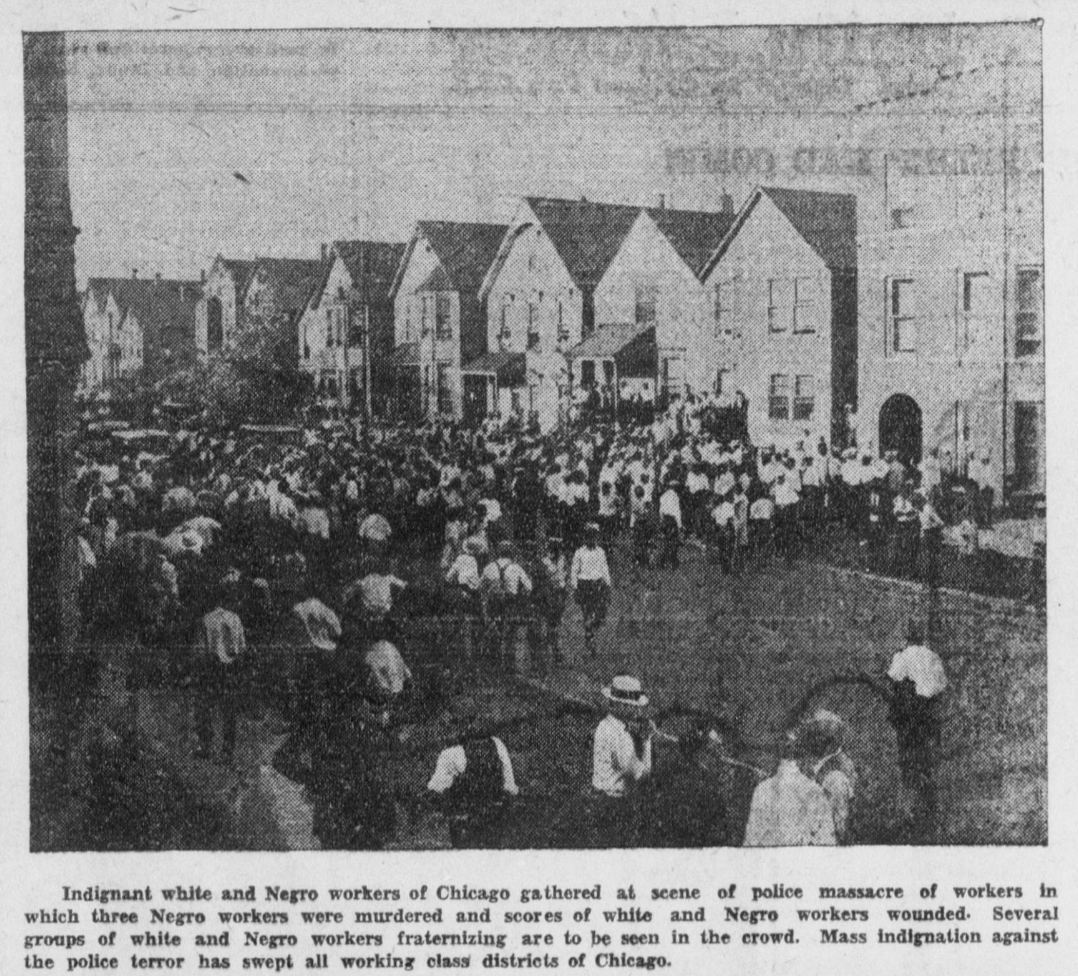
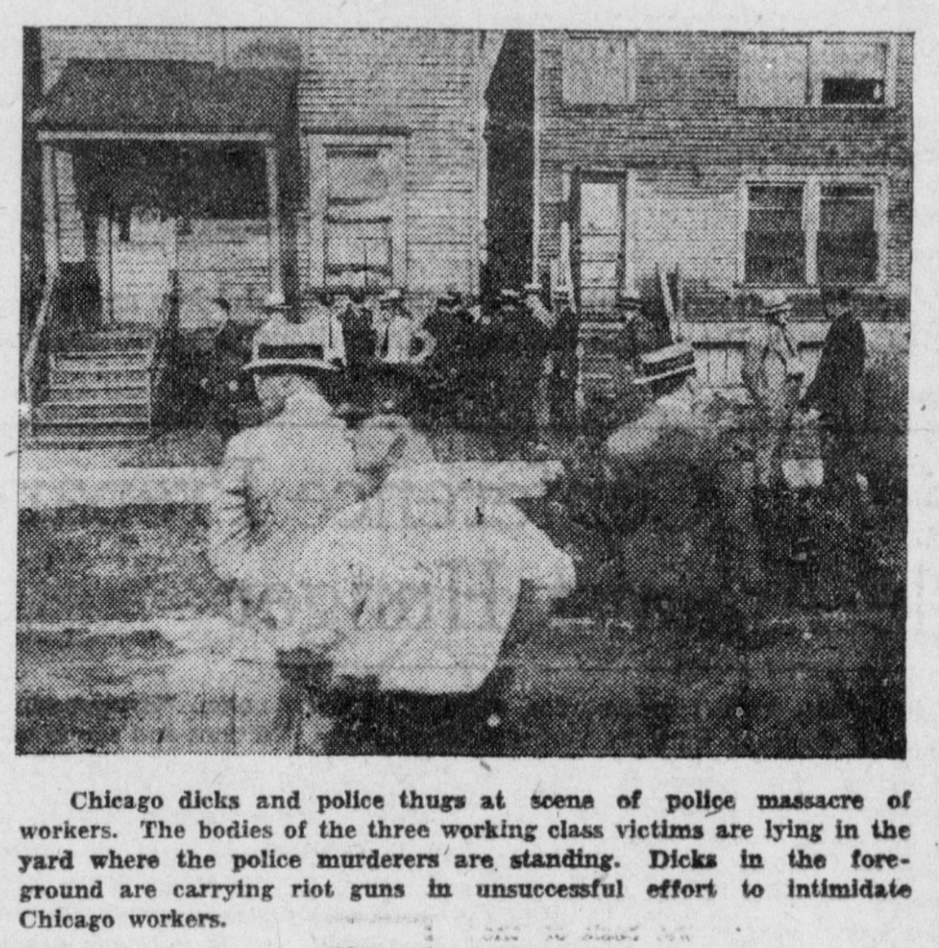
"60,000 Negro and White Workers In Second Huge Protest at Massacre" Daily Worker, published August 6, 1931

=== Memorial and Mass Funeral ===
Minutes after the shootings took place word was already on the way to the downtown headquarters of the CP and Unemployment Council. Bill Gerbert along with several others made their way to the South Side to get more information about what had transpired. In short order, party members like David Poindexter, Squire Brown, Claude Lightfoot and Marie Houston joined approximately fifty other council members who then organized a neighborhood meeting "that turned out seven to ten thousand people that night in Washington Park. Across the next week, the gatherings in Washington Park saw between five and ten thousand sympathizers "listening, questioning, and cheering" as the CP voiced defiant rhetoric against the "capitalist state, racism, and police violence."

Within a few days they had set up a committee to organize and arrange a mass funeral. With the council's support the event managed to symbolize a critique of the city governments positions on civil rights and racial equality while simultaneously criticizing the capitalist system. With the help of party members there were "50,000 party leaflets, 75,000 funeral leaflets, 20,000 League of Struggle for Negro Rights leaflets, and 20,000 Unemployed council leaflets distributed throughout the South Side and its surrounding areas. For the three days leading up to the funeral Grey and O'Neil's bodies lay on display in Old Fellows Hall under rotating twelve hour shifts by guardsmen. This allowed the incensed public to view the bodies which were surrounded by a picture of Lenin along with posters of white and black hands clasped together "and murals of upraised fists."

The funeral was held on August 8, 1931.

A claim is made that a fourth victim was found on August 10, 1931, by the Daily Worker.

Thousands of people came to view the bodies over the next few days and on the day of the funeral, Gerbert later explained, that "the 100,000 workers felt power and took possession of the street" 60,000 unemployed workers were part of the funeral procession and, of those, approximately forty percent were white. The shouting of slogans like "black and white unite" filled the streets as the procession got underway. As the two vehicles transporting the bodies to the railroad station, where they would be held for shipment, moved down the streets they were flanked by six black and white workers "wearing belts of red cloth and followed by thousands of others holding wreaths and flaming posters."

=== Media Response ===
There were several newspaper articles that were written either about the August 3rd eviction and the funeral or about the sentiment and various viewpoints about the unemployment situation in Chicago. Concerning the events on August 8, the Chicago Tribune wrote, "The police officers who handled the eviction disturbance the other day deserve commendation. In a very difficult situation they acted with firmness and as much moderation as the circumstances permitted. That lives were lost and serious injuries incurred was no fault of theirs. Bad judgement or lack of self-control would have precipitated worse results. These officers met a severe test in a way highly creditable to them and the police department and reassuring to the community."

Throughout several other articles from the Chicago Tribune there can be seen "several strands of official response" in the form of strident anticommunism coupled with property rights while denying that race had anything to do with the evictions. In the first reports of violence in August 1931 the Chicago Tribune warned of "further Red rioting" as possible and also putting forth several statements about the unfolding events. The paper said that there seemed to be "no antagonism" between the races and that "red propaganda" was to blame. They also noted that there were reserves of troops at the ready at Camp Grant as well as stating that the bailiffs in the municipal courts were "to temporarily halt the evictions for the present."

The Chicago Defender's articles went further naming the three dead as well as some of the injured policemen involved in attempts to disperse the crowd. Both of the papers reported that communist agitators were involved. The tribune saying "[they] have taken advantage of the widespread unemployment among blacks...to win thousands of colored adherents." The Defender, while acknowledging the difficult situations that American blacks were in, declared that "Communism had no place in America and that "if the black man is found where his friends think that he should not be, his is there because he was driven there. The paper separated itself from the Communist agenda even as they acknowledged that the party had won substantial influence among the black community. Shapiro notes that the priority for the Defender was to illicit an adequate and positive response from the "white Establishment." The Defender plainly blames the CP for the riot because the "fear of continued violence that gripped the South Side...following the red uprising that resulted in the deaths of three citizens."

== See also ==
- 1931–1933 New York City rent strikes
