= Women of Quinn Square =

The women of Quinn Square were a group of mostly working-class women living in Quinn Square, Bethnal Green, London who, in August 1938, organised a rent strike in reaction to the attempted eviction of a female tenant with “the landlord alleging that she owed arrears”. After an investigation it became clear that not only was she being overcharged, but that this overcharging was the case for 70 of the 90 controlled rents.

The women came out in solidarity, refusing to pay their rent. Pickets were deployed every day by women who nailed posters to broomsticks and led impromptu demos. Despite the strike being labelled ‘ill-advised’ by the Hackney Gazette, after two weeks they were successful. Local communist leader, Bob Graves, pronounced Quinn Square residents as the parents of a working class movement: “Once again the people of the East End of London have shown the way”. The strike was opposed by Oswald Mosley's British Union of Fascists.

The strikers' success encouraged further such strikes, elsewhere in London and in other British towns and cities.
