= Rent strike =

Method of protest against landlords

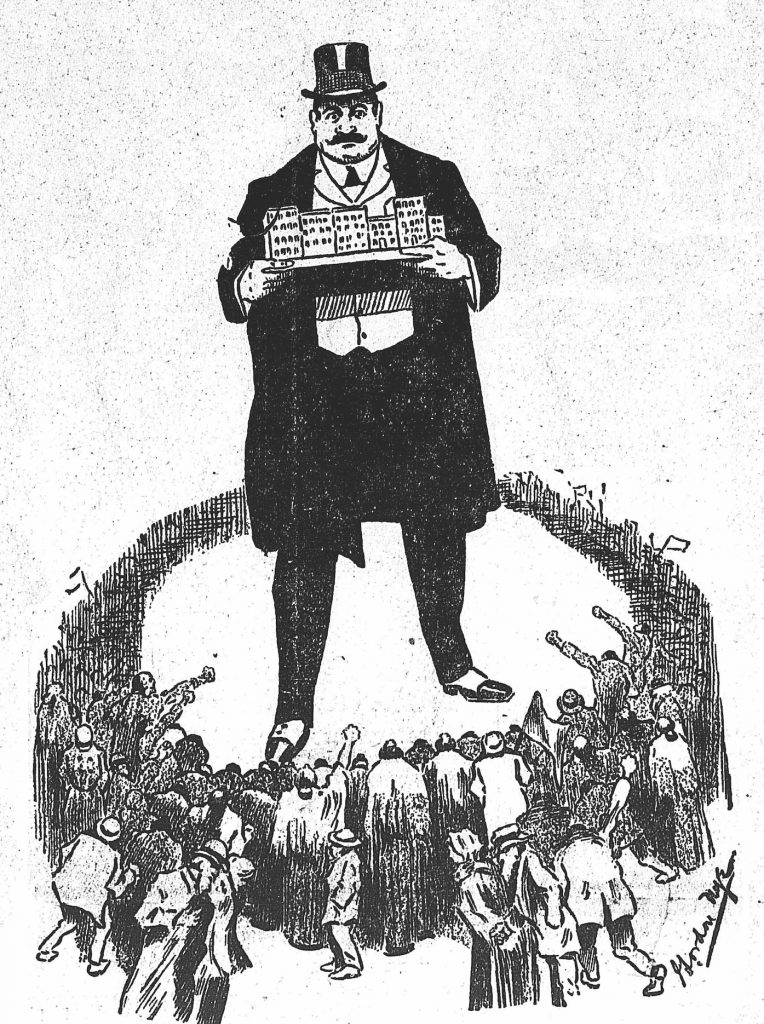
Cartoon for Di Varhayt captioned: "How the landlord pictures himself in the great rent war"

A rent strike, sometimes known as a tenants strike or a renters strike, is a method of protest commonly employed against large landlords. In a rent strike, a group of tenants agree to collectively withhold paying some or all of their rent to their landlords en masse until demands are met. This can be a useful tactic of final resort for use against intransigent landlords, but can carry risks for the tenants, such as eviction, lowered credit scores, and legal consequences.

Historically, rent strikes have often been used in response to various hardships faced by tenants, however, there have been situations where wider societal issues have led to such action.

== Strategy and causes ==
Rent strikes are an example of collective direct action where tenants refuse to pay landlords rent as a leverage of bargining power. Rent strikes can occur due to any number of unaddressed issues facing tenants, such as high or rising rent costs; poor, unsafe, or unhygienic living conditions; precarity and housing insecurity; and unfair or abusive landlords. They may also occur to achieve a change in policy or broader political goals, such as civil and political rights struggles, or an increase in social housing.

Rent strikes are often undertaken by organised groups such as tenants unions. In these cases, tenant unions may establish a strike fund or other form of crowdfunding to help support strikers, particularly against legal threats. Rent strikes may also be undertaken on an informal basis, with some instances seeing tenant unions formed as a result of the action. Some trades unions have been known to support rent strikes.

=== Rolling rent strike ===
A rolling rent strike is a form of rent strike, which involves paying or not paying rent on a month by month basis. This was in contrast to previous tactics where rent was either completely withheld or paid monthly into an escrow account while on strike.

This strategy was devised by Lester Evens and Richard Levenson, two lawyers closely affiliated with the Met Council, the strategy was intended to force pressure on landlords, by creating conditions with which a landlords willingness to negotiate could determine whether they received or lost rents. Which in some cases was shown to be successful in increasing the bargaining power of strikers. The tactic was also used to delay and hinder the effectiveness of court proceedings against strikers. When ordered to pay rent in escrow by courts, the tenants would instead pay a months rent to the landlord and then withhold the next months rent.

== History ==
Some of the earliest evidence of collectively withholding rent comes from the 15th century, where it was noted in arrears lists as quia tenentes negant solvere, (lit. 'because the tenants refuse to pay').

Documentation of rent strikes increased going into the late 19th and early 20th century. Increasing industrialisation and urbanisation saw increased disputes between landlords and tenants. In response to an increasing frequency of rent strikes, landlords in some areas retaliated by forming associations of landlords, such as in Berlin and Stockholm.

The COVID-19 pandemic saw an increase in housing precarity due to issues such as job losses, decrease in income, and the threat of evicition. These factors resulted in a series of rent strikes during the COVID-19 pandemic.

== In historiography ==
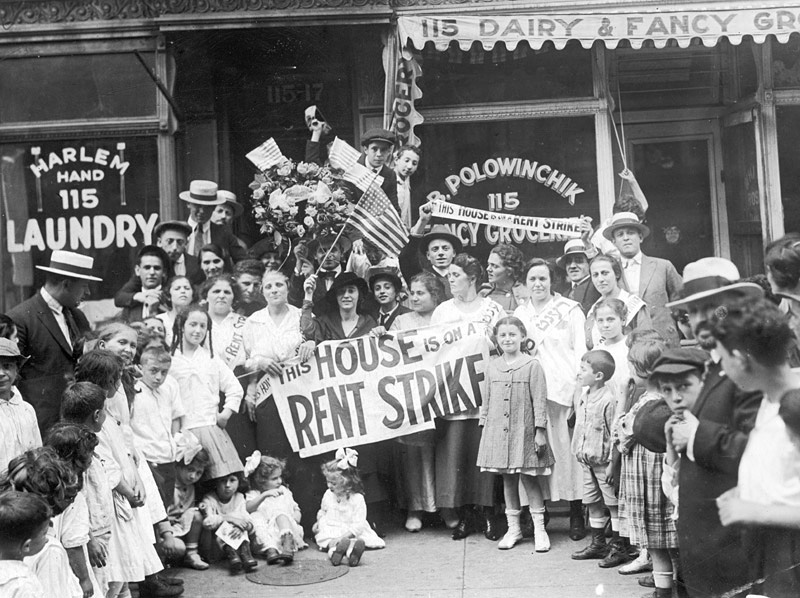
Rent strike, New York, 1919

Frequently cases of rent strikes have gone unreported or under reported by perennial news sources, with details often shared via word of mouth. Additionally, striking tenants do not often make records of the strikes themselves. Where strikes have been recorded—typically larger scale disputes—focus is given to the strike action itself, with the conditions which caused them receiving less focus.

Rent strikes—and more broadly tenants movements—have primarily been analyised in relation to the labour movement and less within its own right. However, there has been a growth of academic interest in rent strikes and tenants movements since the Great Recession.

== Notable rent strikes ==
=== Europe ===
==== Leeds, England, 1914 ====
In early January 1914, around 300 tenants living in the Burley area of Leeds went on rent strike against a 6d increase in rents imposed by the landlords. The rent increase had been called for by the Leeds branch of the Property Owners Association. At a mass meeting of the tenants on Sunday January 10, the rent strike organisers called for a citywide protest against the increase. A week later, the Leeds Trades Council hosted a Labour conference intended to organise mass rent resistance. A Tenants Defence League was formed with a central committee of nine and a mission to spread the rent campaign across the city through a series of public meetings and neighbourhood canvassing. The strike lasted eight weeks. In the end, committee members had been evicted and blacklisted from renting any other home in the area.

==== Glasgow, Scotland, 1915 ====
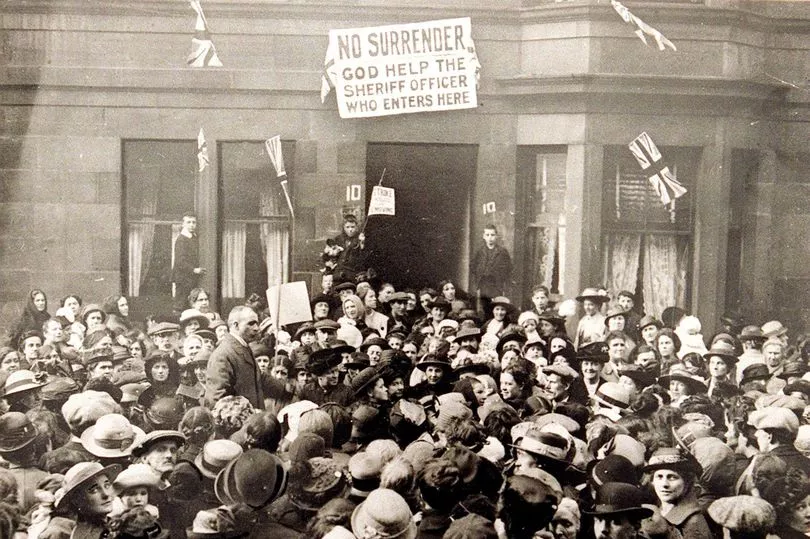

During the Irish Land War of the 1880s and during World War I when the landlords of tenement buildings in Glasgow sought to take advantage of the influx of shipbuilders coming into the city and the absence of many local men to raise rents on the tenements' remaining residents. These women left behind were seen as an easy target and were faced with a rent increase of up to 25% and would be forcibly evicted by bailiffs if they failed to pay. As a result of this rent increase, there was a popular backlash against the landlords and a rent strike was initiated. This was led by Mary Barbour, Mary Burns Laird, Helen Crawfurd, Agnes Dollan, and other women who were dubbed "Mrs. Barbour's Army" who lived in the housing that were experiencing rent increases. The Glasgow Women's Housing Association was led by these women and during rent strikes, women would forcibly prevent the bailiffs from entering the tenements to deliver eviction notices by pelting them with flour bombs, pulling down their trousers, or throwing them into the 'midden' (trash) in the back court of tenement buildings. The strikes soon spread, not only across the tenants of Glasgow, but across Glasgow workplaces. This became an overwhelming success, as Glasgow was a main producer of munitions for the war effort of WWI. These strikes moved out from Glasgow and on to other cities throughout the UK, and influenced the government, on 27 November 1915, to introduce legislation to restrict rents to the pre-war level. The 1915 Rent Restrictions Act was implemented after a protest held in Glasgow, by workers and tenants in support of five women who were taken to court for refusing to pay their rent.

==== Gothenburg, Sweden, 1936–1937 ====
During the 1930s the Gothenburg Tenants' Movement launched a rent-reduction campaign, using calls to boycott, cancellation of contracts and rent strikes to further their goals. Almost two thousand properties were affected and thousands of tenants got rent reductions as a result. The organized landlords retaliated and during the Olskroken Conflict 1936-1937 hundreds of tenants were evicted. The Olskroken conflict ended in a loss for the landlords, signalling the beginning of the end for tenant militancy in Gothenburg.

==== Barcelona, Spain, 1931 ====
Between 5,000 and 100,000 people were out on rent strike.

==== Northern Ireland, 1960s-80s ====
During "The Troubles" (1960s-1980s) in Northern Ireland, participants in the civil rights movement withheld rent and council rates from local councils in protest at internment.

==== Kirkby, England, 1972 ====
A 14-month-long rent strike initiated by 3,000 tenants on October 9, 1972, in the town of Kirkby, outside Liverpool, against the Housing Finances Act, caused a £1 rent rise. A group of women on the Tower Hill estate formed a discussion and support group to help themselves and their families through the factory closure crisis when the Housing Finances Act was passed these women formed an Unfair Rents Action Group and responded by organizing the rent strike.

==== University College London, England, 2015-18 ====
Originally starting in 2015 with just 60 students, by 2016 a rent strike movement involving over one thousand students at University College London withholding their rent had formed, eventually winning hundreds of thousands of pounds in concessions. This rent strike spread to other UK universities, with many setting up "Cut The Rent" campaigns. Since this 2016 rent strike there have been rent strikes also in 2017 and 2018 at UCL, continuing to demand cheaper rents and better conditions, which have also gone on to win over £1.5 million.

=== Africa ===
==== South Africa, 1980s ====
Rent strikes occurred in the 1980s to end Apartheid and gain ownership of housing by the tenants. The government sent in troops to Soweto in 1987. "Residents of some public housing have not paid their rents in several years, and in many cases officials have stopped trying to collect and have turned ownership over to tenants. In Soweto, for instance, Government officials say at least 50,000 rental units have been given to tenants."

=== North America ===
==== New York State, 1839–45 ====
The Anti-Rent Movement (also known as the Anti-Rent War and Helderberg War) was a tenants' revolt in upstate New York in the period 1839–1845. The Anti-Renters declared their independence from the manor system run by patroons, resisting tax collectors and successfully demanding land reform.

==== New York City, 1904 ====
In 1904, the first mass rent strike in New York City occurred. In response to rising rents, 2,000 families went on strike for over a month. By its end the tenants had successfully won rent reductions.

==== New York City, 1907 ====
In 1907, in response to rising rents due to housing shortages 10,000 families in lower Manhattan went on rent strike. One of the primary organizers was 20-year-old Pauline Newman, along with housewives and women working in the garment industry. It lasted from December 26 until January 9 and led to about 2,000 families having their rents reduced.

==== New York City, 1918-20 ====
“Right in the Nose!” Brooklyn Daily Eagle
Sept 27, 1920
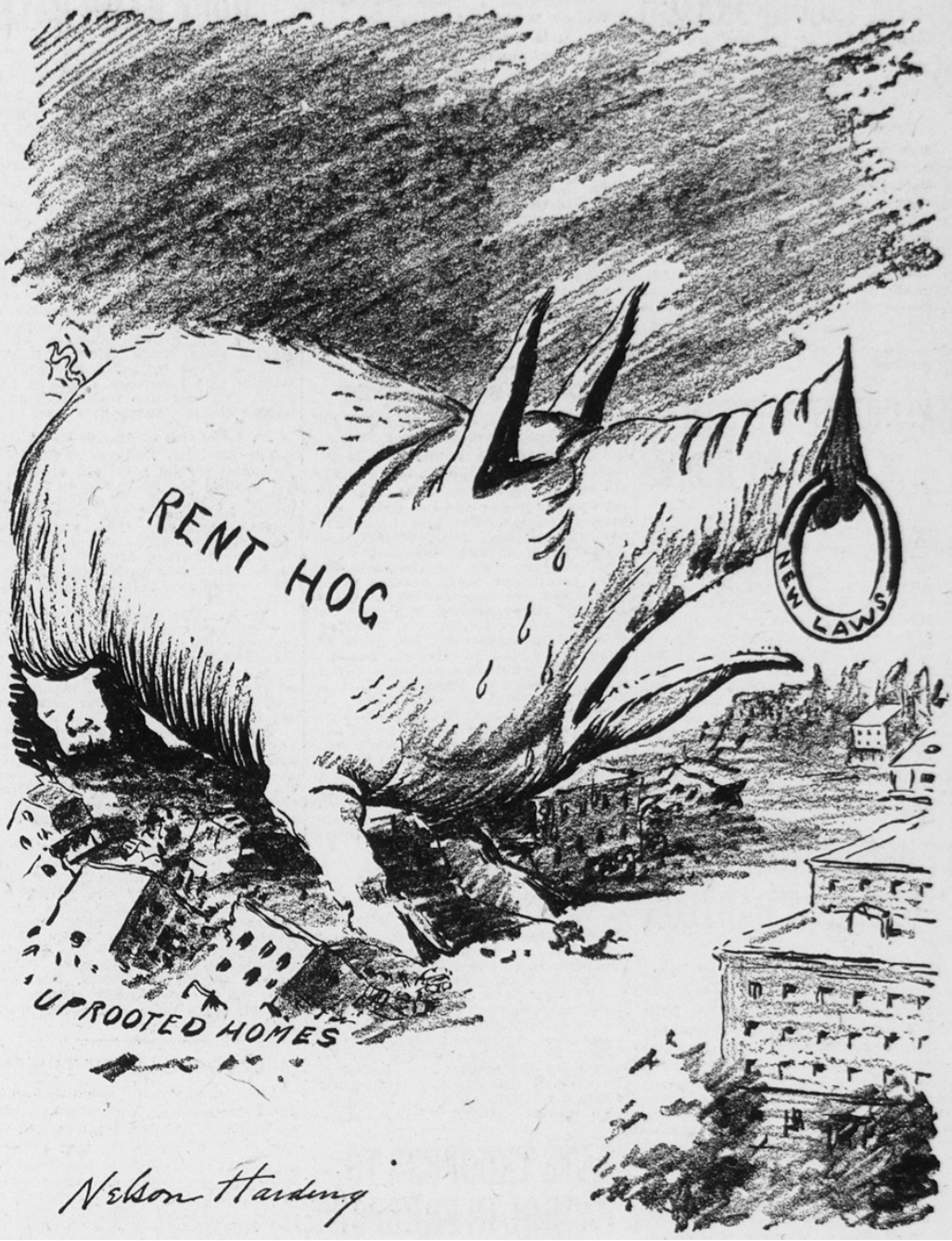

The 1918-20 New York City Rent strikes were some of the most significant tenant mobilizations against landlords in NYC history. As a result of a World War 1 housing shortage, a coal shortage during a brutal winter, frequent raising of rents and landlord property speculation; Waves of rent strikes occurred across the entire city among poor and middle-class tenants alike. First over dangerously freezing flats, when many landlords stopped providing heating during the coal shortage, and later over rent. Somewhere between at least several 10,000's and 100,000's of tenants struck across the city over the two-year period. It led to the passage of the Emergency Rent Laws by the state of New York, the first rent control in the nations history, which remained in place until 1929. Individually many of the strikes also won their demands for the reduction of rent and in many cases yearly written instead of oral leases.

==== Chicago, 1920-21 ====
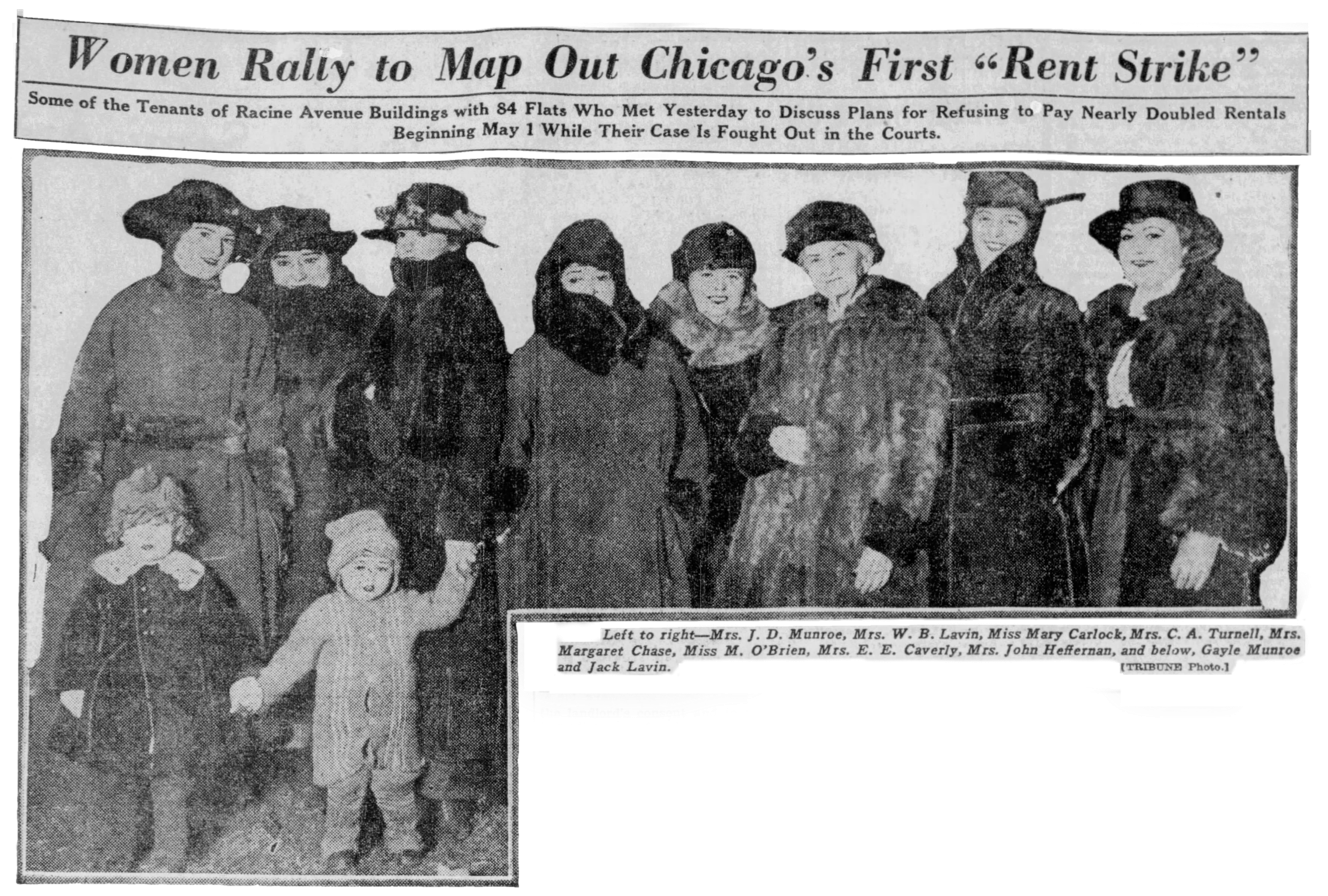
Chicago Tribune; February 29, 1920

From 1920 to 1921, Chicago had a series of tenant strikes over rent increases. The strikes lead to the formation of the Chicago Tenants Protective association, passage of the Kessenger tenant laws, and of a heat ordinance that legally required flats to be kept above 68 °F during winter months by landlords.

==== Communist Party and American Labor Party efforts, 1930s-40s ====
During the Great Depression and through the end of World War II, labor unions played a major role in the mass-mobilization of the working class. These labor unions combined forces with leftist political organizations like the Communist Party and American Labor Party to rally for three major policy changes: rent control, public housing, and building-code enforcements.

==== United States, 1960s-70s ====
Rent strikes spread through the US in response to the chronic neglect of repairs in both urban private and public housing stock. The 1960s were characterized by two distinct fronts within the tenant movement: (1) the tenant-student alliance led by Marie Runyon starting in 1961 that, though largely symbolic, generated media traction and political clout for the movement, and (2) a movement of radical Black movement participants led by the Black Panther Party and the Young Lords party who used a direct action approach to bring attention to the failings of the state and encouraged poor New York City neighborhoods to take charge of abandoned properties. After the Harlem rent strikes in 1963–4, it became a popular tactic both among students in university towns and public housing tenants who were living in squalid conditions due to lack of funding and racist federal policies.

===== New York City, 1963-64 =====
In the winter of 1963–1964, a rent strike erupted in Harlem. It was led by Jesse Gray, a tenant organizer there since 1953. The focus of the strike was not rent levels but poor maintenance.

===== Boston, 1964-70 =====
In 1964, more than 20 families engaged in the first major rent strike of Boston's history, with the support of the Boston Congress of Racial Equality chapter. Previously tenants had met with the landlord to have him address the 150 sanitation, building and fire code violations, which he refused to fix. After the start of the strike, more rent strikes followed across the city. These strikes continued into 1969. Rent control was passed in the state legislature in 1970.

===== Tulare Labor Camps, California, 1965-68 =====
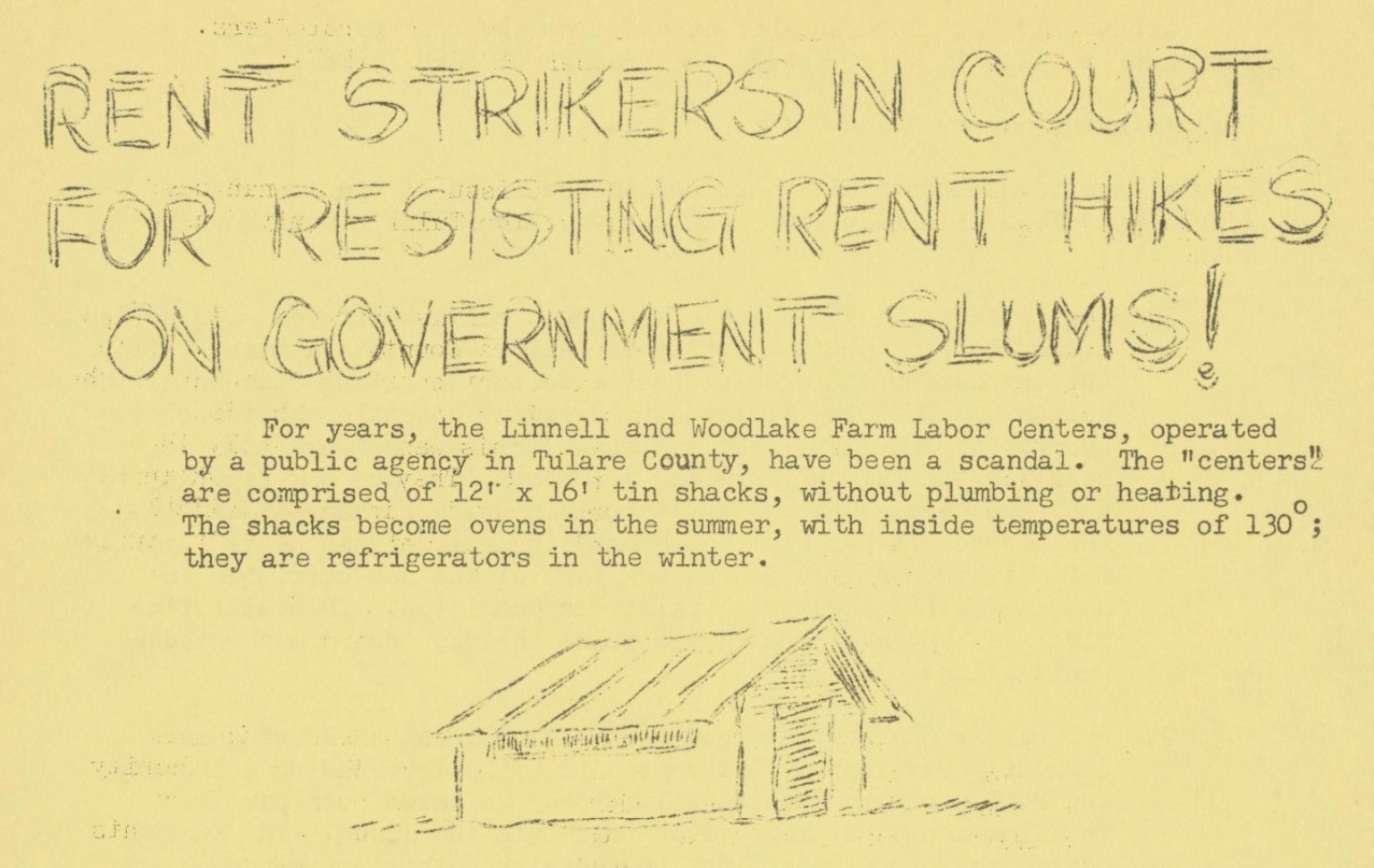
Excerpt from Sept, 1965 Farm Labor Vol. 3, Issue 4.

The Tulare Labor Camps rent strike was a strike by tenants of the Woodville and Linnell farm labor camps in 1965 against rent increases by the Tulare County Housing Authority and the inhabitable conditions of the tin houses they lived in, led by the National Farm Workers Association (NFWA), alongside support by numerous civil rights and student organizations. It lasted three years and successfully stopped the proposed rent increase, and led to the construction of new houses to replace the tin huts.

===== 1966 West Side Rent Strike =====
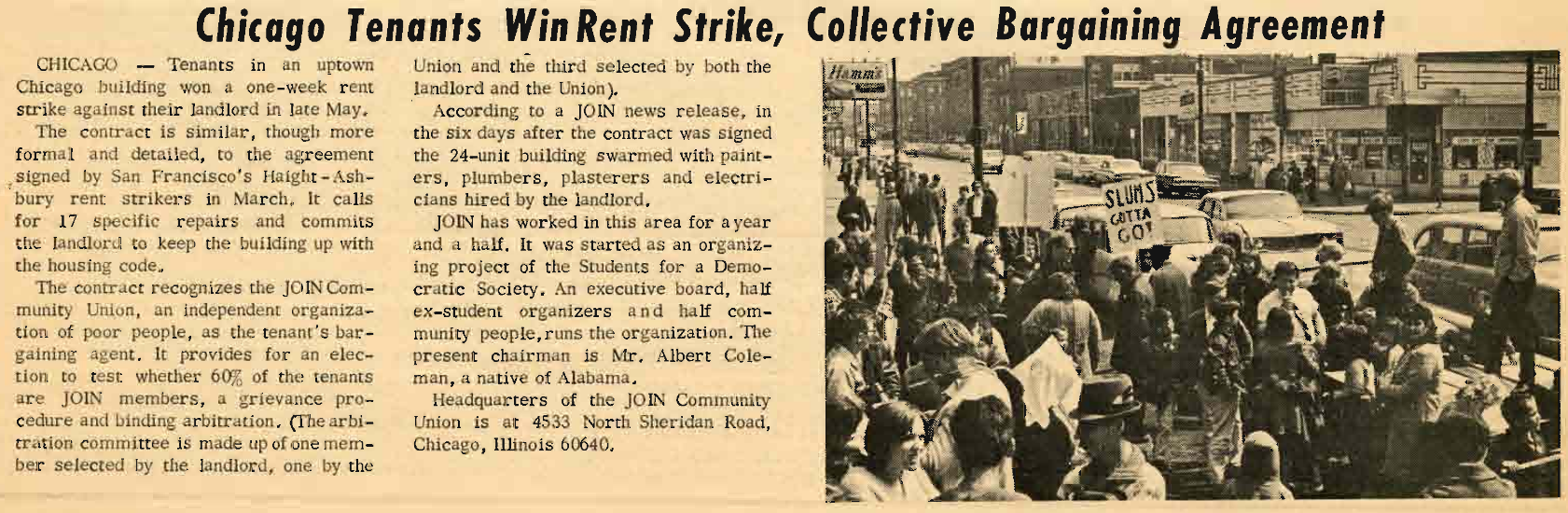
The Movement, July 1966 Vol 2. No. 6

In August of 1966, the Chicago Freedom Movement was launched MLK and other Civil Rights activists. As part of the broader campaign, MLK and Correta King moved into a slum apartment on the West Side. The 'End Slums' initiative included the use of organizing tenants unions and rent strikes. In February, MLK and some of his staff would clean up the rat infested tenement at 1312 South Homan Avenue they were living in, and then a week later led a march of 200 people who claimed they were assuming 'trusteeship' of the property on behalf of tenants, with rents paid to the organization not the landlord, and used for repairs. The landlord eventually won in court against them. Other tenant unions such as JOIN would however win collective bargaining agreements with their landlord(s).

==== Thorncliffe Park Rent Strike in 2023-2024 ====
The Thorncliffe Park rent strike, initiated on May 1, 2023, was a response by tenants of buildings 71, 75, and 79 on Thorncliffe Park Drive in Toronto, to what they deemed excessive rent increases imposed by their landlords, Starlight Investments and the Public Sector Pension Investment Board (PSP). This mobilization followed a 5.5% increase above the guideline, attributed to renovations in common areas, while problems in the apartments themselves were ignored. Despite unsuccessful attempts at dialogue, the tenants have maintained their action to date, paying their rent into a trust held by the Landlord and Tenant Board (LTB) pending a resolution.

=== South America ===
==== Argentina, 1907 ====
In 1907, a popular movement against the rise in rents in tenant houses in the city of Buenos Aires and other Argentine cities, popularly called conventillos, escalated into a rent strike. The strike began in August 1907, it lasted approximately 3 months and more than one hundred tenants participated in the movement, with thirty-two thousand workers on strike. It had a significant presence of anarchist and socialist activists.

== See also ==
- List of rent strikes
- Tenants union
- Eviction
- Landlord harassment
- Squatting
- Liverpool City Council v Irwin [1976] UKHL 1, a UK case on rent strikes, finding that the matter should be handled as a question of implied contract terms
- UK labour law
- Women of Quinn Square
- Article 7A (NYC housing code)
- Eviction resistance
