= Eviction resistance =

Strategy used by tenants to resist evictions

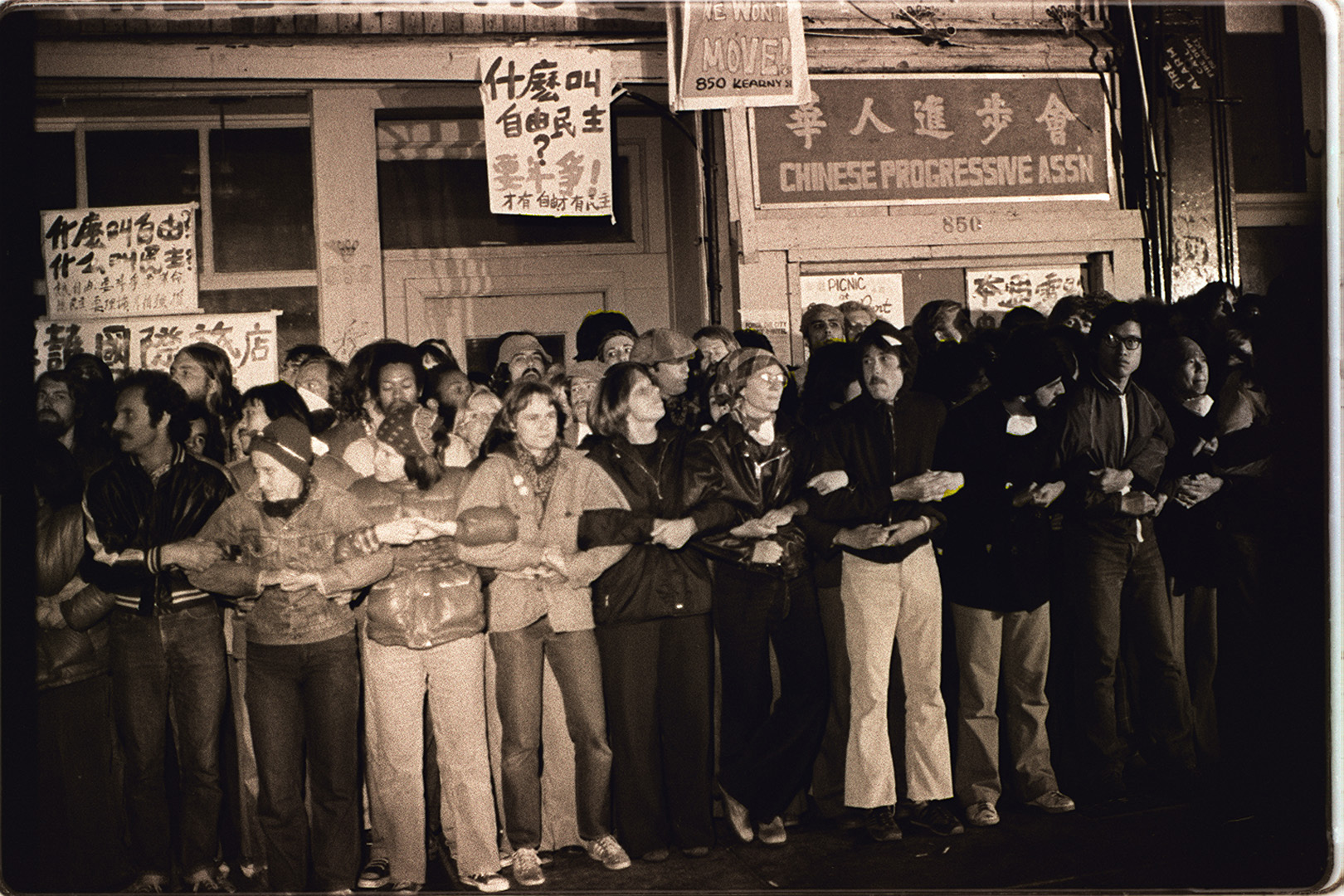
Protesters lock arms to prevent the eviction of the International Hotel tenants, San Francisco, CA, 1977.

Eviction resistance is a strategy used by tenants, sometimes through tenants unions, in order to prevent an eviction from being successful. It can involve different tactics – from disrupting legal proceedings, to publicly pressuring the landlord or authorities to drop the eviction, to physically blocking the removal of tenants and their possessions from the premises.

In the US, this strategy was popularized in the 1930s during the Great Depression, in part by the Communist Party led Unemployed Councils. These organized groups would move furniture that had already been removed from an apartment or home back into the building where the eviction was taking place, and then call for neighbors, tenants or tenant organizers to actively resist further attempts at eviction by police or marshals.

In Spain, following the 2008 financial crisis, grassroots organizers formed Plataforma de Afectados por la Hipoteca (PAH) to defend those facing evictions due to foreclosures. PAH resists evictions by having members show up at the home facing eviction to prevent it being carried out, and by occupying banks to pressure them to drop the evictions and alert the public to their practices.

During the COVID-19 pandemic, as evictions increased around the world, tenants increasingly responded with organized resistance.

== See also ==
- Rent strike
- 1931 Chicago housing protests
