= Steinem (surname) =

Steinem is a surname. Notable people with the name include:

- Gloria Steinem (1934–2026), American journalist and social movement activist
- Pauline Perlmutter Steinem (1864–1940), Jewish American suffragist
- Susanne Steinem Patch (1925–2007), American gem expert and lawyer
