= Women Cross DMZ =

Non-profit organization

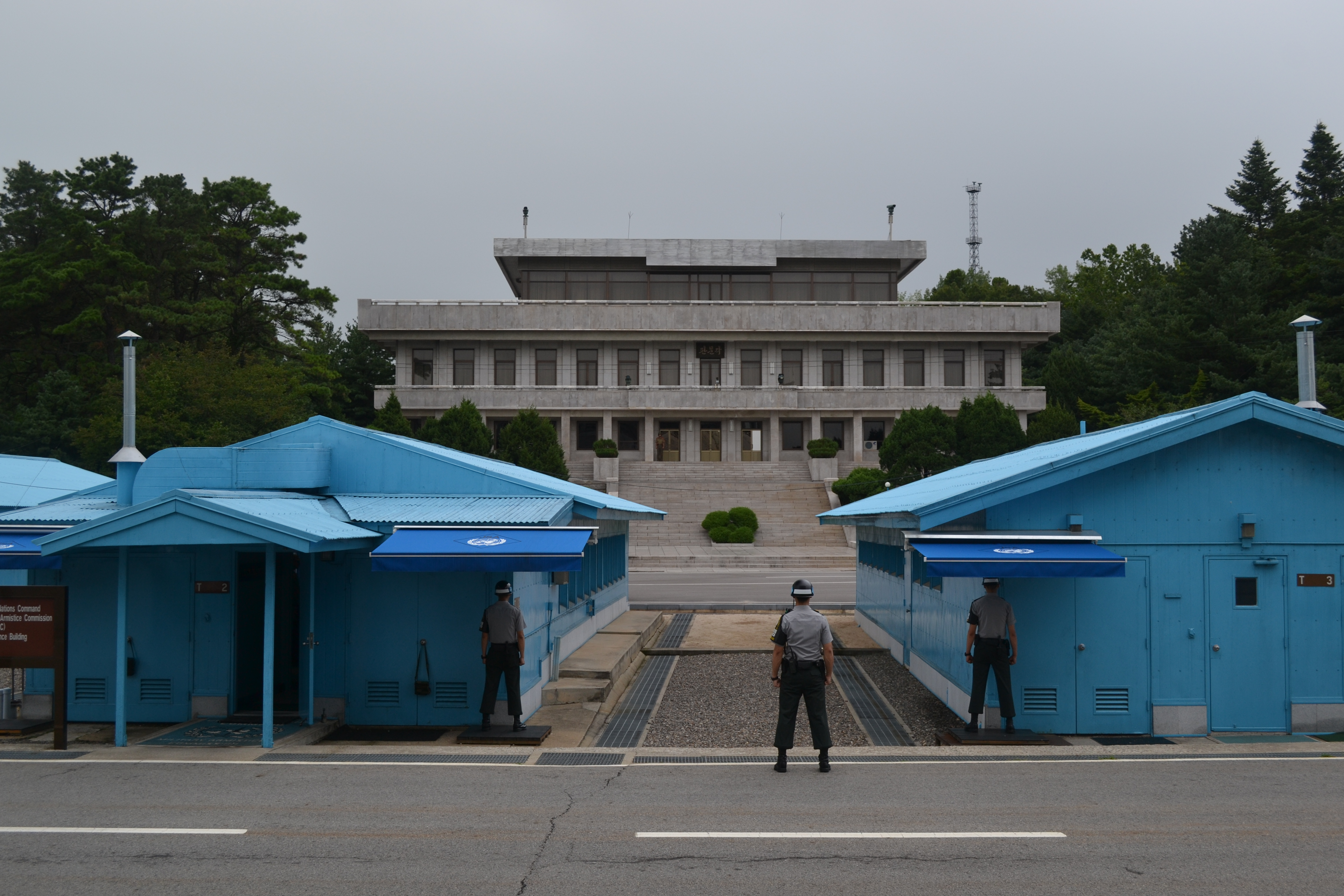
Korean Demilitarized Zone (DMZ) from the South Korea side

Women Cross DMZ (WCDMZ, Korean: 위민 크로스 DMZ) is a non-profit organization mobilizing women around the world to promote peace in Korea, as well as denuclearization and demilitarization of the Korean Peninsula. Founded in 2014 by Christine Ahn, a Korean American peace activist, the advocacy and education organization of feminists, lawyers and peace activists calls for a formal end to the Korean War and the replacement of the armistice agreement with a peace agreement. In 2015, WCDMZ made international headlines when it organized a historic crossing of the heavily armed De-Militarized Zone (DMZ) that separates North Korea from South Korea at the 38th parallel.

In 2015, WCDMZ gained international recognition by organizing a historic crossing of the De-Militarized Zone (DMZ) that separates North Korea from South Korea. Thirty women—including two Nobel Peace laureates and feminist icon Gloria Steinem—walked arm-in-arm with 10,000 Korean women on both sides of the DMZ, on the wide boulevards of Pyongyang and the cobblestone streets of Kaesong, and along the barbed-wire fence in Paju. With this historic act they called for three things: an end to the Korean War, the reunification of separated families, and women’s involvement at all levels of the peacebuilding process.

Since then, WCDMZ has continued to educate, advocate, and organize for an end to the Korean War. They have helped catalyze new collaborations such as the U.S.-based Korea Peace Network; have spoken to college audiences, community groups, and faith-based organizations; and helped mobilize a broad grassroots network of local, national and international peace organizations. They have also coordinated high-profile letter campaigns, strengthened relations with North Korean and South Korean women’s groups, and led an intervention of feminist peace activists in Vancouver to urge foreign ministers from 20 nations to prepare the table for peace talks. For seven consecutive years, WCDMZ has held events at the UN Commission on the Status of Women to highlight the urgent need for women’s inclusion in the Korea peace process, as called for by the landmark UN Security Council resolution on women, peace, and security. In March 2019, WCDMZ joined with the Nobel Women’s Initiative, Women’s International League for Peace and Freedom, and the Korean Women’s Movement for Peace to launch the global campaign Korea Peace Now! Women Mobilizing to End the War.

== Crossing the DMZ ==
On May 24, 2015, International Women's Day for Disarmament, thirty women—including Gloria Steinem, two Nobel Peace laureates and retired Colonel Ann Wright—from 15 different countries linked arms with 10,000 Korean women, stationing themselves on both sides of the DMZ to urge a formal end to the Korean War (1950–1953), the reunification of families divided during the war, and a peace building process with women in leadership positions to resolve decades of hostility. It was unusual for South Korea and North Korea to reach consensus on allowing peace activists to enter the tense border area, one of the world's most dangerous, where hundreds of thousands of troops are stationed in a heavily mined zone that divides South Korea from nuclear North Korea.

In the weeks leading up to the walk, Steinem told the press, "It's hard to imagine any more physical symbol of the insanity of dividing human beings."

On the day of the crossing, South Korea refused to give the women permission to walk through Panmunjom, a border town where the 1953 truce was signed, so the women had to eventually cross the border by bus. Nevertheless, Steinem labeled the crossing a success. "We have accomplished what no one said can be done, which is to be a trip for peace, for reconciliation, for human rights and a trip to which both governments agreed." A South Korean lawmaker charged, "They're creating the false impression that North Korea is actually interested in peace."

In addition to Steinem, participants in the crossing included organizer Christine Ahn from Hawaii; Code Pink co-founder Medea Benjamin; Liberian Nobel laureate Leymah Gbowee and Northern Ireland Nobel laureate Mairead Maguire.

During the crossing, some South Koreans protested by calling the women "useful idiots unqualified for peace"; others said the women were being manipulated by the North Korean government or DPRK, implicated in violations of human rights. Supporters of the crossing said they were "citizen diplomats" who hoped their crossing would encourage more people-to-people exchanges. "Every little step is a step in the right direction," Liberian Nobel Peace laureate Leymah Gbowee told the press. Steinem said the group's effort to promote peace and reconciliation was said to be impossible." Participants said the crossing focused global attention on the unnecessarily protracted Korean War, with support from world leaders, including UN Secretary General Ban Ki-Moon, Archbishop Desmond Tutu, the Dalai Lama, former US President Jimmy Carter and South Korean lawmakers. They were criticized by the Human Rights Foundation.

== See also ==
- Nodutdol
