= January 27, 2007, anti-war protest =

Protest March in Washington, D.C, US

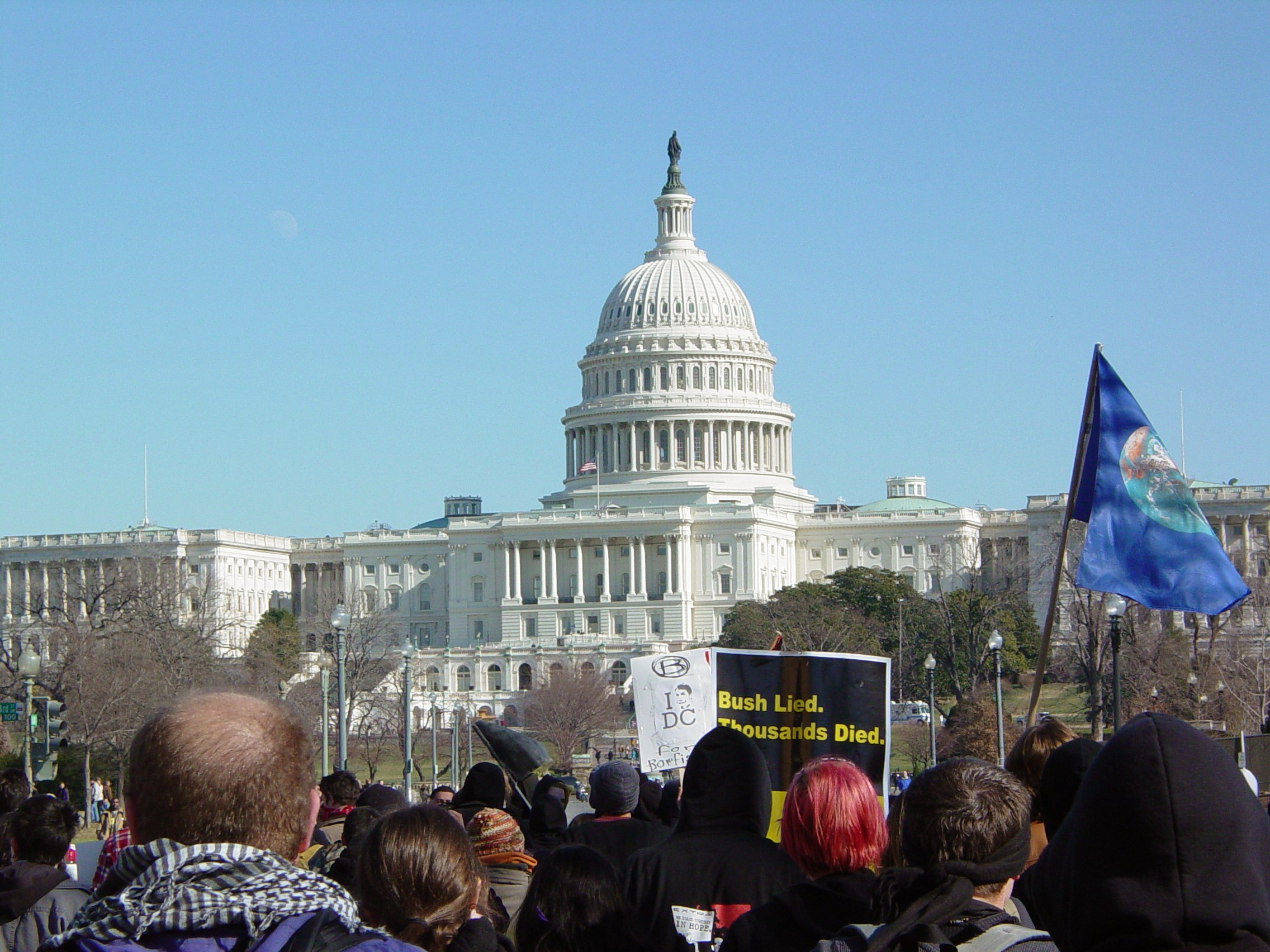
The protest in Washington, D.C., organized by United for Peace and Justice and held on January 27, 2007

The January 27, 2007 anti-war protest was an anti-war march sponsored by United for Peace and Justice in Washington, D.C. The official event consisted of a rally and march at the United States Capitol.

At the protest, it was announced that at least 500,000 attended to the protest, according to aerial photography estimates. Associated Press, however, reported that the march drew "tens of thousands".

== Background and Goals ==
The January 27, 2007 protest in Washington, D.C. was part of a broader anti‑Iraq War movement, organized to oppose continuation of the U.S. military presence in Iraq and to pressure Congress and the White House to end the war. Demonstrators demanded the withdrawal of U.S. troops and an end to war funding, reflecting widespread public discontent with the conflict.

== Event and March Details ==
On January 27, 2007, thousands of demonstrators gathered on the National Mall and near the U.S. Capitol in Washington, D.C., marching and holding rallies calling for an end to the Iraq War. Marchers chanted slogans such as “Bring our troops home” and featured speeches, performances, and coordinated lobbying efforts.

== Participation and Notable Speakers ==
The protest included a diverse group of participants, including Iraq War veterans, family members of fallen soldiers, peace activists, lawmakers, and public figures. Actress Jane Fonda addressed the crowd, marking one of her first large anti‑war speeches in decades, highlighting the generational breadth of support for ending the war.

== SDS feeder march ==
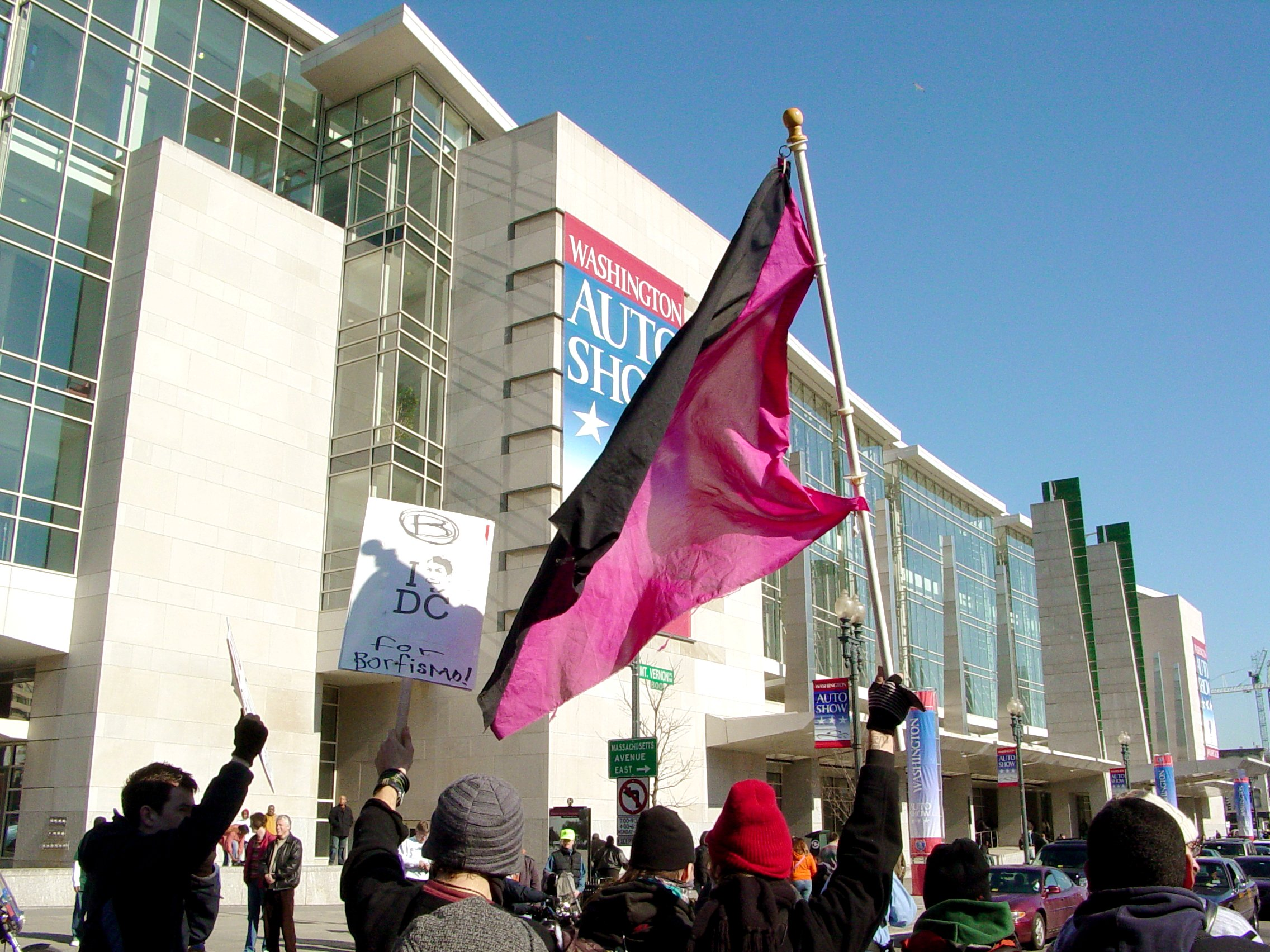
Anarchist participants in the radical youth feeder march headed towards the main rally

A black bloc, organized by Students for a Democratic Society, and advertised as a "radical youth bloc" on the DC Indymedia site, met at Dupont Circle to begin a feeder march to the main rally site on the National Mall. The march from Dupont Circle to the National Mall roughly followed Massachusetts Avenue NW to its intersection with 7th Street NW near the Washington Convention Center and then on 7th Street through Chinatown and the Penn Quarter prior to reaching the National Mall. The feeder march continued past the back of the mainstream rally on 7th Street, and onto Maryland Avenue SW, before briefly stopping at 3rd Street, at roughly the center line of the Mall.

=== Rush to the Capitol ===
United States Capitol Police stopped the SDS feeder march near the corner of 3rd and Maryland. As the march turned north, police blocked protesters who walked onto the Capitol lawn. Other protesters, both from the march and on the Mall, moved up in support. The Capitol police moved back to the Capitol building. Some participants in this group left graffiti on the Capitol grounds.

=== March to recruitment center ===
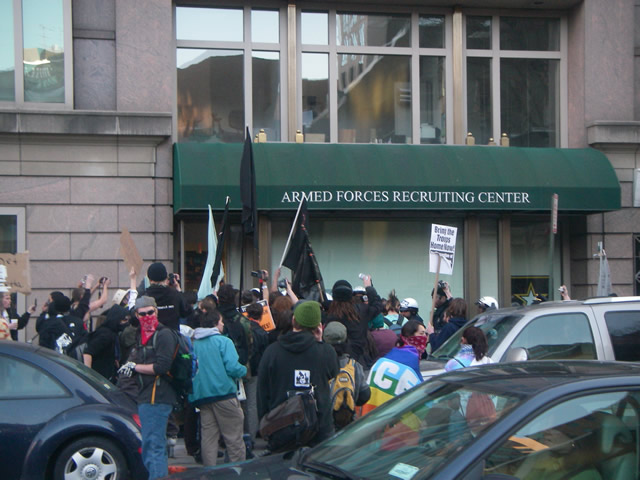
March to the Armed Forces Recruitment Center

In the late afternoon, approximately 30 demonstrators marched to the Armed Forces Recruiting Center on 14th Street. The window at the recruitment center and the window of a Fox News van were smashed, and the demonstrators dispersed soon afterward.

== Counter-protests ==
A counter-protest, which was organized by Free Republic, drew approximately 30 people in the vicinity. Organizers of the counter-protest claimed that anti-war efforts hurt the U.S.-led war on terror.

== See also ==
- List of protest marches on Washington, DC
- Protests against the Iraq War
