= Andrea Marra =

American politician (born 1985)

- Born: April 15, 1985 (age 41); Seoul, South Korea
- Education: Pace University (BA)

Andrea Hong Marra is an American politician and human rights activist who ran to represent Queens' District 13 in the New York State Senate. She used to work in communications at the Arcus Foundation. She serves on the boards of Freedom for All Americans and Just Detention International.

In November 2018, Marra was appointed executive director of Transgender Legal Defense & Education Fund (TLDEF).

== Personal life ==
Marra was born in Seoul, South Korea and was adopted as an infant. She grew up in Albany, New York, raised by a mother who worked as a dietician. Marra came out to her parents as gay in sixth grade, and was bullied after coming out in middle school. She advocated for the Dignity for All Students Act in high school, planting her aspirations for public office.

In 2003, she took a job with GLSEN in upstate New York, and came out as transgender. She graduated from Pace University in 2008 and moved to Jackson Heights in 2009, after being attacked in her previous neighborhood due to her transgender identity.

Marra met her birth mother as a participant of a trip to Korea organized by Nodutdol for Korean Community Development. In 2012, she authored a Huffington Post blog post telling the story of coming out as a transgender woman to her South Korean birth mother, and the post went viral.

Marra is engaged to be married. Her fiancé, Drew, is also a Korean American adoptee.

== Political career ==
Marra has worked in LGBT advocacy at GLSEN as a publications manager, at GLAAD as a senior media strategist and, currently, Arcus Foundation. She once served on the board of the National Center for Transgender Equality.

In addition to LGBTQ advocacy, Marra is an advocate for Korean Unification and worked at Nodutdol.

Marra announced her candidacy for New York State Senate on February 6, 2018, citing healthcare reform, transportation, affordable housing and safety as her legislative priorities.

== Awards and recognition ==
- White House Next Generation of LGBTQ Leaders
- The Advocate's 40 under 40 in 2012
