= Independent Research Service =

Former CIA front organization

The Independent Research Service was a non profit front organization financed by the Central Intelligence Agency during the Cold War. Harvard University students were recruited to infiltrate the USSR-controlled World Youth Festivals held in Vienna, Austria and Helsinki, Finland. Second-wave feminism leader Gloria Steinem revealed in a 1967 interview that she was its director from 1958 to 1962—the extent of its existence— in full knowledge of who was backing the surveillance operation.
