= National Women's Political Caucus =

American women's rights organization

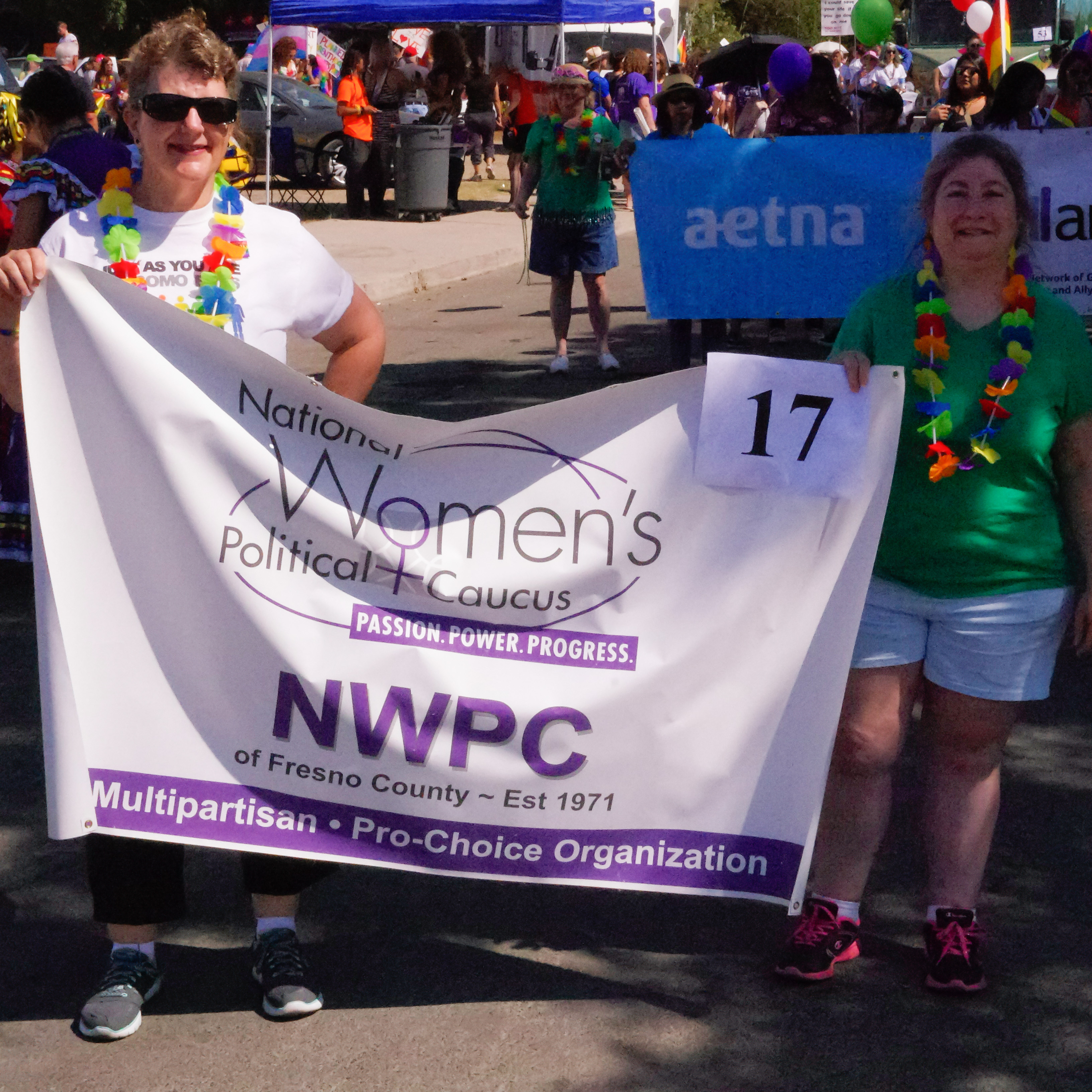
- National Women's Political Caucus www.nwpc.org/ Fresno Rainbow Pride Parade and Festival, June 2015
- Formation: 1971
- Founders: Bella Abzug; Shirley Chisholm; Betty Friedan; Fannie Lou Hamer; LaDonna Harris; Mildred Jeffrey; Jill Ruckelshaus; Gloria Steinem
- Type: 501(c)(3) nonprofit
- Headquarters: Washington D.C., United States
- Services: Women's rights
- Official language: English
- Website: nwpc.org

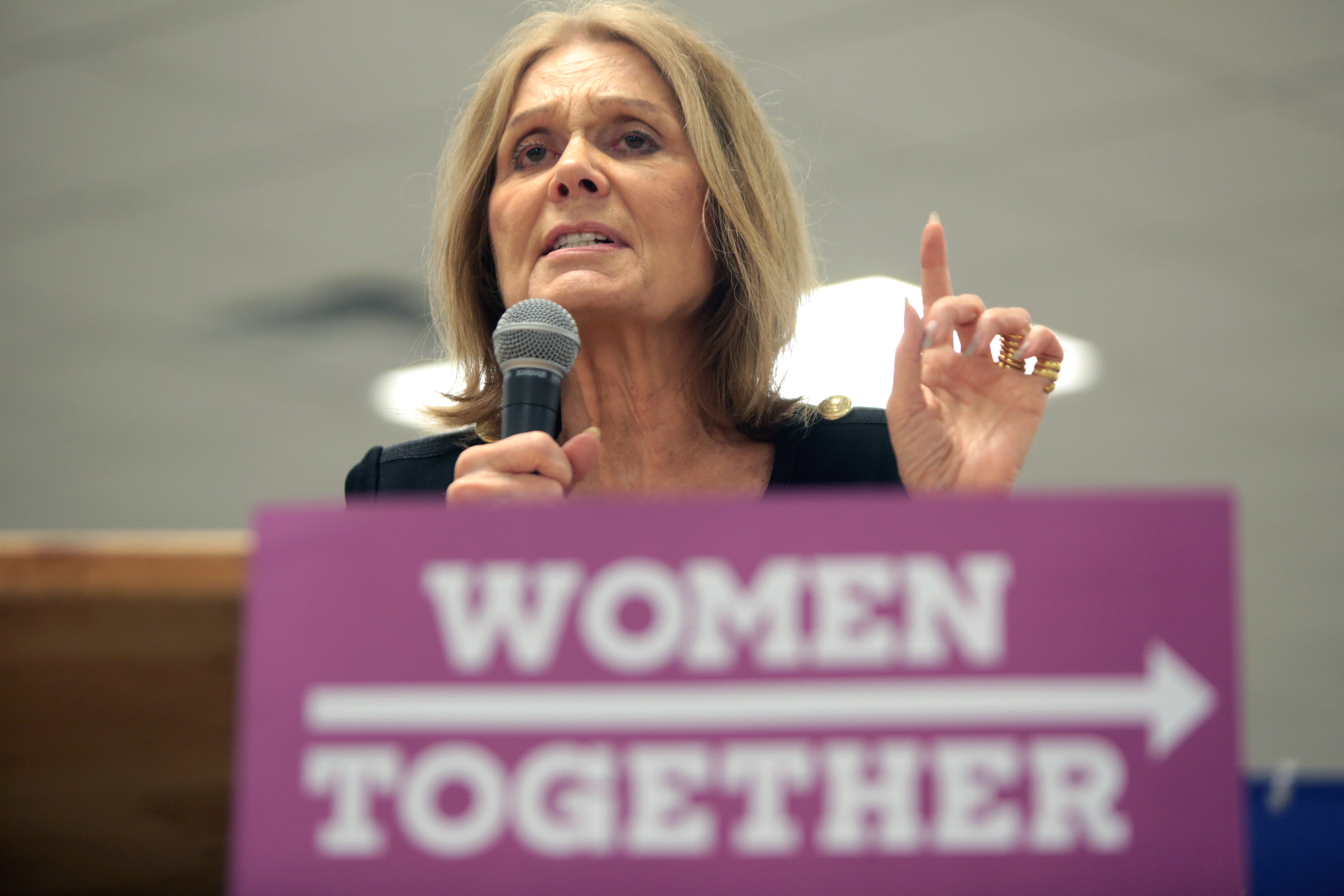
Gloria Steinem speaking with supporters at the Women Together Arizona Summit at Carpenters Local Union in Phoenix, Arizona

The National Women's Political Caucus (NWPC), founded in 1971, is a multi-partisan grassroots organization in the United States. The organization was founded by leaders of the women's liberation movement to promote women's participation in government. The NWPC is dedicated to recruiting, training, and endorsing female candidates at the state and national levels who adhere to the organization's core values.

== History ==
=== Organizing convention ===
"The group's main purpose is to get women into positions of power, women who are committed to the causes of other women - not women who are going to just imitate the male politics as it has been practiced all these years complete with elitism, racism and prejudice against women, but women who really care about their sisters and will work for social reform. " -Gloria Steinem describing the purpose of the NWPC, July 1971.

An Organizing Convention for the NWPC was hosted in Washington, D.C. from July 10 to 11, 1971. Approximately 324 women were in attendance, representing 27 states and the District of Columbia; among them were Bella Abzug, Shirley Chisholm, Betty Friedan, Fannie Lou Hamer, LaDonna Harris, Mildred Jeffrey, Florynce Kennedy, Jill Ruckelshaus, Ora Lee Malone, and Gloria Steinem. At the founding meeting, Steinem delivered an Address to the Women of America, in which she characterized feminism as a "revolution" that meant striving for a society free of racism and sexism; the speech, delivered at the height of the women's movement, became a milestone in U.S. female oratory.

The Organizing Convention primarily consisted of several workshops where the attendees created plans for how the group would operate in the short and long-term. The Workshop on the Future Structure of the NWPC developed a plan for the group's decision-making structure, while the Women's Priorities Workshop established the organization's Statement of Purpose.

The original organizers of the NWPC had not initially planned to take any official policy stances, as the group was originally conceived as a nonpartisan working group to get women in positions of power; however, a group of Black women at the conference led by Chisholm and NWPC member Vivian Mason urged the organization to adopt a stricter anti-racist position, citing fears that the organization would endorse a racist white woman over a male candidate of color or who supported Black liberation. The organization agreed to add strong antiracist policy positions to the Statement of Purpose, eventually adopting a list of other policy positions supporting different marginalized groups; these included the ratification of the Equal Rights Amendment, developing a way to provide all Americans with “an adequate income,” and the strengthening of existing anti-discrimination laws.

=== National prominence: 1971-1978 ===
Immediately following the conference, the National Women’s Political Caucus began its efforts to bring more women into elected and appointed political positions. In 1971, the organization demanded that states ensure their delegations to both the Democratic and Republican 1972 Presidential Conventions be no less than 50% female, launching Women’s Education for Delegate Selection, a project that educated women on the rules and procedures used to select delegates for party conventions. The organization’s leadership also met with several presidential candidates, including NWPC co-founder Chisholm, George McGovern, Eugene McCarthy, Edmund Muskie, and Hubert Humphrey, to discuss gender parity in state delegations. Although gender parity was not reached at either convention, the number of women attending both the Democratic and Republican conventions grew significantly as a result of the NWPC's efforts, and women at both conventions were able to introduce the "Women's Plank," a list of policies put together by the NWPC that put women's issues, primarily anti-discrimination law and increased access to reproductive healthcare, front and center.

Throughout the 1970’s, the organization starts several initiatives focusing on bringing women to different areas of public life, including the Win with Women campaign recruitment program, the Coalition for Women’s Appointments, focused on bringing more women into appointed positions related to policymaking, and the Judicial Appointment Project, which focused on getting women nominated and appointed to state and federal courts. Within several months of the Win With Women program starting, the number of state legislators who were women jumped 26 percent, while the number of women holding federal judgeships increased from five to forty-one in the three years following the Judicial Appointment Project. A particularly large win for the organization occurred in 1976, when leadership from the organization met with then-presidential candidate Jimmy Carter to discuss the representation of women in all areas of government; the group was able to win the future president’s support, as he promised to appoint several women to high-profile positions in his administration if he were to win- a promise he ultimately kept, naming three women to Cabinet-level positions over the course of his presidency. In addition to these other projects, the NWPC continued its efforts to increase the percentage of female delegates to the party conventions, calling for gender parity in the 1976 and 1980 delegations to both the Democratic and Republican Presidential Conventions; in 1978, the Democratic National Committee passed a measure requiring an equal division of men and women at the 1978 mid-term and 1980 presidential conventions.

== Leadership ==
The President of NWPC is Deidre Malone. The 1st Vice President and VP of Development is Dawn Lott. The Vice President of Communications is Gale Jones Carson. The VP of Political Planning and Appointments is Leta Schlosser. The National Programs Director is Kate McDonald.

=== List of chairs and presidents ===
The national head of the NWPC was referred to as the "Chair" from 1973 to 1989; since then, the leader of the organization has been referred to as the "President" of the NWPC.

- 1973–1975: Frances "Sissy" Tarlton Farenthold
- 1975–1977: Audrey Rowe Colom
- 1977–1979: Mildred "Millie" Jeffrey
- 1979–1981: Iris Mitgang
- 1981–1985: Kathy Wilson
- 1985–1989: Irene Natividad
- 1989–1991: Sharon Rodine
- 1991–1995: Harriet Woods
- 1995–1999: Anita Perez Ferguson
- 1999–2004: Roselyn O'Connell
- 2017–2023: Donna Lent
- 2023–2026: Deidre Malone

== Activities ==
The NWPC organizes campaign workshops across the country to teach the nuts and bolts of running a successful candidacy at all levels of government.

=== Political endorsements ===
The NWPC endorses female candidates at the state and national level who adhere to the organization's core set of values. To be considered for an endorsement by the NWPC, candidates must adhere to five criteria, as listed on the organization's website.

1. Support passage of a federal Equal Rights Amendment (ERA) to the U.S. Constitution;
2. Support a women’s right to choose an abortion as established by the Supreme Court’s 1973 decision in Roe v. Wade (and support public policy that guarantees equal access to abortion and to a full range of reproductive health services)
3. Support increased access to child care and other dependent care;
4. Have a past record indicating support for NWPC’s goals, purposes and bottom line issues, and if she has held other elective office;
5. Are willing to make the NWPC endorsement known.

Through its political action committee, the National Women's Political Caucus Victory Fund, the organization also makes financial donations to some of the candidates it endorses.

=== Other activity ===
The Caucus also offers workshops on political appointments and collaborates with other women's political organizations to promote viable women candidates for gubernatorial and presidential appointments to key posts within the government.

The NWPC has state and local caucuses in communities across the country to help identify candidates, needs and issues specific to their state or county. State caucuses currently include Arizona, California, Florida, Georgia, Indiana, Kentucky, Massachusetts, Maryland, Missouri, New Jersey, New York, Ohio, Tennessee, Texas, and Washington.

A statement by 16 women's rights organizations including the National Women's Political Caucus, the National Women's Law Center, the Girls, Inc., Legal Momentum, End Rape on Campus, Equal Rights Advocates, the American Association of University Women, and the Women's Sports Foundation said that, "as organizations that fight every day for equal opportunities for all women and girls, we speak from experience and expertise when we say that nondiscrimination protections for transgender people—including women and girls who are transgender—are not at odds with women’s equality or well-being, but advance them" and that "we support laws and policies that protect transgender people from discrimination, including in participation in sports, and reject the suggestion that cisgender women and girls benefit from the exclusion of women and girls who happen to be transgender."

On January 28, 2025, NWPC and over 170 other women's rights organizations issued an open letter condemning the persecution of transgender people under the second Trump administration. The letter described Executive Order 14166, which defined legal recognition of women strictly by reproductive biology and sought to restrict transgender rights, as "cruel and lawless." The organizations argued that its true intent was to stigmatize and discriminate against transgender, nonbinary, and intersex people while enforcing gender stereotypes.
