= Irene Natividad =

Filipino-American women's rights activist

Irene Natividad (born 14 September 1948 in Manila, Philippines) is an American feminist and women's rights activist. She is president of the GlobeWomen Research and Education Institute, whose programs include the annual Global Summit of Women and Corporate Women Directors International. She previously served as chair of the National Women's Political Caucus, chair of the National Commission on Working Women, executive director of the Philippine American Foundation, founder and president of Asian American Professional Women, and founding director of the National Network of Asian-Pacific American Women.

== Early life and education ==
Irene Natividad was born in Manila, Philippines, the eldest of four children of a chemical engineer. The family followed their father to several countries where he worked, including Japan, Iran, Greece, and India. In 1971, she graduated as valedictorian of the undergraduate class of Long Island University. In 1973, she obtained a master's degree in American literature and, in 1976, a master's degree in philosophy from Columbia University.

From 1974-1976, Natividad taught early American literature, first at Lehman College of City University of New York and then at Columbia University. In 1974, she married Andrea Cortese, a satellite communications executive. Together, they have one son.

== Political activities ==
Her political career began with the distribution of leaflets for the presidential candidate Eugene McCarthy in 1968. From 1982 to 1984, she was the chairman of the New York State Asian Pacific Caucus, then vice-chair of the newly formed Asian Pacific Caucus of the Democratic National Committee. In 1984, she supported the election campaign of Geraldine Ferraro, the first female vice presidential candidate nominated on the Democratic party ticket, and served as the campaign's liaison to Asian-American voters.

She was elected as the chair of the National Women's Political Caucus (NWPC) in 1985, making her the first Asian-American woman to lead a national political organization in the United States. In 1987, she was re-elected as chairman. Under her leadership, the caucus gathered hard data to analyze factors influencing women's congressional races and compiled an annual Survey of Governors' Appointments of Women to state cabinets. The caucus also established the first-ever Minority Women Candidates' Training Program and created the Good Guy Award honoring men who further the cause of women's rights.

During the 1990s, she assumed the chairmanship of the National Commission on Working Women, which works on economic equity issues affecting women through groundbreaking research and training programs, and held the role for nine years.

To promote women candidates for high government-appointed positions, Natividad served as Chair of the Coalition for Women's Appointments for three Presidential administrations - for George H.W. Bush in 1998, Bill Clinton in 1992, and Barack Obama in 2008. She also served as National Chair for Asian Americans and Pacific Islander (AAPI) Women for Hillary during Hillary Clinton's presidential campaign in 2008 and 2016.

Natividad has also been influential in several campaigns to increase the number of women voters in Presidential Elections in the U.S. As Chair of the Women’s Vote Project in 1996, she led a non-profit coalition of 110 women’s groups, and, in 2000, as Chair of Women Vote 2000, she focused the Coalition’s efforts on encouraging more women of color to vote.

== Global Summit of Women ==
To promote women's economic opportunities and advancement, Natividad has convened the Global Summit of Women, star-studded forums for women in business and government globally. The first Global Summit of Women took place in 1990 in Canada, with the second taking place in 1992 in Dublin, Ireland, followed by Taipei in 1994. Since the 1997 Summit in Miami, Florida, the Global Summit of Women has taken place annually. Informally called the Davos for Women by participants, the Summit focuses on sharing best practices and working strategies that advance women’s economic status globally. In recent years, over 1,000 women from over 60 countries consistently attend each Summit, with participants ranging from Heads of State and women government ministers of various portfolios to male and female senior executives of multinational corporations to women entrepreneurs of small and mid-sized businesses.

Over the three-decade history of the Global Summit of Women, participants have included South African President Nelson Mandela, numerous sitting Presidents including Mary Robinson of Ireland, Vaira Vike-Freiberga of Latvia, Gloria Macapagal-Arroyo of the Philippines, Michelle Bachelet of Chile, and Tarja Halonen of Finland, Prime Minister of Japan Shinzo Abe, Prime of France Manuel Valls, and corporate leaders including PepsiCo Chair and CEO Indra Nooyi and Chair of MCM Holdings AG Sung Joo Kim.

An off-shoot of the Global Summit of Women is the internationally renowned Corporate Women Directors International (CWDI), which conducts research on women on the boards of directors of top companies globally. CWDI is frequently cited in the global media on the topic of women on boards. As chairperson of CWDI, Natividad has authored 36 reports since 1997, including six editions of the CWDI Report on Women Board Directors of the Fortune Global 200 between the years of 2004 and 2019.

Natividad was invited by the European Commission to address the Committee on Women Rights and Gender Equality in 2010, as it deliberated on a measure to mandate a quota for women board directors across the EU.

Since 2006, she has pioneered Market Opens which have gathered women in business and politics to spotlight the achievements of women in the economy through participation in 27 ring-the-bell ceremonies at Stock Exchanges around the world. The Market Opens have taken place at NASDAQ (2006) in New York, the Toronto Stock Exchange (2008), Johannesburg Stock Exchange (2009), Madrid (2011 and 2024), Istanbul (2011 and 2026), Barcelona (2012), Warsaw (2012 and 2016), São Paulo (2012), Hong Kong (2012), Zurich (2013), Kuala Lumpur (2013), the Deutsche Boerse in Frankfurt (2013), the Euronext Paris Exchange (2014), ASX in Sydney (2014), Manila (2015), Mexico City (2016 and 2018), Ho Chi Minh City (2017), Bangkok (2017 and 2022), Bogota, Colombia (2018), and Dubai, UAE (2023).

== Board directorships and appointments ==
Natividad has served on several international advisory boards for governments and policy organizations. In 2019, she was appointed by French President Emmanuel Macron to the G7 Gender Equality Advisory Council, which was tasked with providing recommendations to President Macron to advance women's equality during the year of France's Presidency of the G7. She has also served on Advisory Boards for G20 Engagement Groups, including the T20 (Think Tanks) and W20 (Women), as a member of UN Women's Leadership for Gender Equality Forum, has been a Board Member for the Global Economic Symposium based in Germany, and the European Commission’s Network to Promote Women in Decision-Making.

In the corporate arena, Natividad has served on numerous corporate and advisory boards. In 1994, she was appointed to the Board of Directors of Sallie Mae Corporation, a Fortune 100 company, by President Clinton. Other board positions include advisory boards for L'Oreal France, Cigna Corporation, Wyndham International, Enterprising Women Magazine, National Association of Corporate Directors (NACD), the National Museum for Women in the Arts and the International Museum of Women. In addition, she was a member of the 2012 NACD Blue Ribbon Commission on Board Diversity

== Awards ==
- 1988, 100 Most Powerful Women in America, by Ladies Home Journal
- 1989 Honorary Doctorate of Long Island University
- 1992 74 Women Who Are Changing American Politics, by Campaigns & Elections Magazine
- 1994 Honorary Doctorate of Marymount College (New York) for their global commitment to women's rights
- 1997 "25 Most Influential Working Mothers" by Working Mother Magazine
- 2004 "21 Leaders for the 21st Century" by Women's eNews
- 2010 Enterprising Women Magazine Hall of Fame
- 2012 "Women Worth Watching” by Diversity Journal Magazine
- 2014 "Top 10 Champion of Global Diversity” by Diversity Global Magazine
- 2015 “Trailblazing Woman” by Huffington Post
- 2021 Chevalier of the National Order of Legion of Honor (Legion d'Honneur)
- 2024 Lifetime Achievement Award in Public Service by President Joe Biden

== Resources ==
Gale Encyclopedia of Biography: Irene Natividad

Homepage of the Global Summit of Women

Biography Irene Natividad, Homepage Globe Women
