= Nodutdol =

New York-based Korean organization

- Nodutdol for Korean Community Development
- 노둣돌
- Formation: April 1999
- Founder: John Choe
- Founded at: Woodside, Queens
- Headquarters: New York
- Website: https://nodutdol.org/

The Nodutdol for Korean Community Development or Nodutdol (Korean: 노둣돌; lit. 'stepping stone') is a nonprofit and nongovernmental 501(c)(3) advocacy organization of Koreans residing in the United States and Canada. The organization describes itself as aiming to "organize a world free of imperialism, and for Korea's re/unification and national liberation". The New York Times has described the organization as "mostly younger" and progressive. Some Korean-language newspapers in New York City have claimed that the organization is controlled by North Korea, which its founder has denied.

== History ==
Nodutdol was founded in April 1999 by Korean American community organizer John Choe, and is composed of Korean Americans. The group states its founding was inspired by pro-democracy social movements in South Korea.

In the early 2000s, the group took a vocal stance against the U.S. invasion of Iraq, and organized teach-ins and protests against the war. This drew criticisms from some in the Korean American community in New York City, who labelled the group anti-American. Some in the community feared that such activities would result in accusations that the entirety of the community would be deemed anti-American. During this time, a number of Korean-language newspapers in the city accused the organization of being controlled by North Korea, and one employee of the South Korean Consulate General in New York anonymously said "Nodutdol is kind of a pro-North Korean group". In 2003, The New York Times reported that, at the time, the group's website had "plenty of praise" for the North Korean dictatorship, and that the group organized "educational trips" to North Korea. Korean American political scientist and former Bush administration official Victor Cha noted that Nodutdol's sentiment took place alongside the ascent of the Sunshine Policy in South Korea, which Cha called "a strange kind of infatuation with North Korea".

== Activities and views ==
Nodutdol's activities include organizing protests, published zines, showing films and documentaries, and organizing trips to North Korea.

The group has organized campaigns against the United States–Korea Free Trade Agreement and other free trade agreements. Nodutdol has also participated in campaigns organized by United for Peace and Justice, the International Action Center, Korean Americans for Fair Trade, Korean Americans for Peace, People's Justice for Community Control and Police Accountability, and A.N.S.W.E.R.

The organization has provided various social services to Korean American immigrants.

As of 2024, Nodutdol is engaged in a campaign called "US Out of Korea", demanding that the United States end its military presence in South Korea.

=== North Korea ===
Nodutdol has organized a number of trips to North Korea. In a 2021 document, the group stated it had organized 11 delegations to North Korea. The group has voiced its opposition to sanctions imposed on North Korea by the United States and the United Nations, stating that they "take a humanitarian toll on the entire population by undermining their ability to survive".

Some within the Korean American community have denounced the group as being pro-North Korea, or even controlled by North Korea, particularly in the wake of the group's protests against the U.S. invasion of Iraq.

Beginning in 2012, the organization also ran the Intergenerational Korean American Oral History Project as a means to share knowledge about the Korean War and its impacts.

=== Palestine ===
The organisation, as "anti-imperialistic Koreans", has also expressed support for Palestine, particularly during the Gaza War. Park Ju-Hyun, a member of Nodutdol, had also spoken at the People’s Conference for Palestine in June 2024, drawing parallels between the Korean War (which he referred to as the "Great Fatherland Liberation War") and the Nakba as shared struggles for national liberation. The Jerusalem Post alleged Nodutdol to be a "pro-North Korean" group that "is also rabidly antisemitic", citing how the group had called for "an end to the Zionist occupation of Palestine".

== Notable members ==
- Andrea Marra

== See also ==
- Korean American National Coordinating Council
- Women Cross DMZ
