= Address to the Women of America =

1971 speech by Gloria Steinem

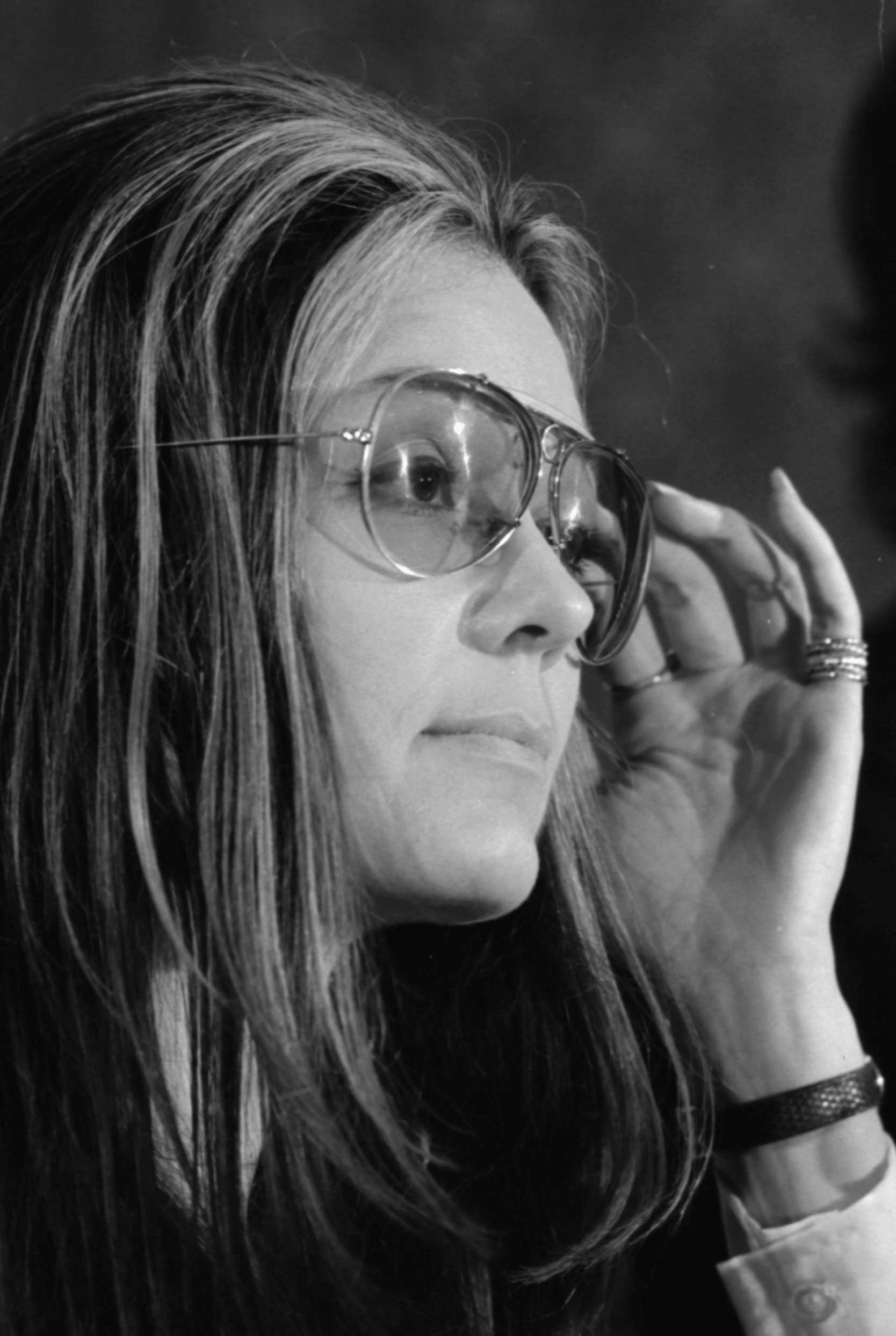
Feminist Movement leader Gloria Steinem.

On July 10, 1971, at the founding of the National Women's Political Caucus (NWPC) in Washington, D.C., NWPC co-founder Gloria Steinem delivered an Address to the Women of America. The speech furthered the ideas of the American Women's Movement, and is considered by some to be one of the greatest speeches of the 20th century. Steinem refers to the idea of sex and race as being easy ways to organize people into inferior and superior beings due to the prominent characteristics and traits that are easy to point out. She also claims that the only roles in society seem to be for those who are chosen or for those who earned them. Not only did the speech address the issues of sexism and misogyny, but also those of racism and social class. The speech is mostly remembered for the following quotation:

This is no simple reform. It really is a revolution. Sex and race, because they are easy, visible differences, have been the primary ways of organizing human beings into superior and inferior groups, and into the cheap labor on which this system still depends. We are talking about a society in which there will be no roles other than those chosen, or those earned. We are really talking about humanism.

In Jennifer Lopez's 2016 music video for her song "Ain't Your Mama", Steinem can be heard saying part of this speech, specifically, "This is no simple reform. It really is a revolution."
