= Mildred Jeffrey =

American activist

- Born: December 29, 1910; Alton, Iowa, U.S.
- Died: March 24, 2004 (aged 93); Detroit, Michigan, U.S.
- Education: University of Minnesota (BA); Bryn Mawr College (MA)
- Occupations: Activist, union organizer
- Spouse: Homer Jeffrey
- Awards: Michigan Women's Hall of Fame (1983); Presidential Medal of Freedom (2000)

Mildred McWilliams "Millie" Jeffrey (December 29, 1910 – March 24, 2004) was an American political and social activist during the labor reforms, women's rights, and civil rights movement.

== Biography ==
Mildred Jeffrey's mother, Bertha McWilliams, who raised Millie alongside six other children, became Iowa's first female registered pharmacist in 1908 and owned a drugstore in Alton and later in Minneapolis.

Jeffrey attended the University of Minnesota as an undergraduate, where she graduated with a bachelor's degree in psychology in 1932. It was here that she began to involve herself in the socialist and progressive movements. As students, she and an African-American classmate worked to integrate restaurants in Minneapolis. In 1934, she earned her master's degree in social economy and social research from Bryn Mawr College.

In 1936, she married another union organizer, Homer Newman Jeffrey. During their marriage, they worked to unionize textile factories in the South and East. Together, they had two children. They divorced in 1950.

=== Career ===
Jeffrey became a union organizer in Philadelphia in 1935 for the Amalgamated Clothing Workers of America. It was there that she met Homer Newman Jeffrey.

During World War II, Jeffrey and her husband moved to Washington, D.C. to become consultants for the War Labor Board. There, they became close to the leaders of the United Auto Workers, Walter and Victor Reuther. In 1944, she moved to Detroit after she was offered a position as head of the U.A.W.'s new Women's Bureau. Jeffrey became the first woman to head a department of the U.A.W. After returning veterans resulted in mass postwar layoff of women from factory jobs, she organized the U.A.W.'s first women's conference. Jeffrey held many other positions within U.A.W.: she ran the union's radio station between 1949 and 1954, became director of its community relations department and aligned the union with many civil rights efforts, and headed the union's consumer affairs from 1968 to 1976, the year she retired.

She worked on the campaign of then Senator John F. Kennedy and later managed Senator Robert F. Kennedy's Michigan state presidential campaign in 1968.

In 1971, she helped establish the National Women's Political Caucus, fighting for ratification of the Equal Rights Amendment, child care and equal pay legislation. She also became a leader in the Democratic Party committee that ensured that half of the delegates to its 1980 convention were women.

In 1977, Jeffrey became an associate of the Women's Institute for Freedom of the Press (WIFP).

Jeffrey played a major role in many groups, including the Coalition of Labor Union Women, Emily's List, Americans for Democratic Action, the National Abortion Rights League, the American Civil Liberties Union, the Democratic Socialists of America, and on the peer review board of the Blue Cross.

=== Civil Rights ===
Jeffrey joined the NAACP in the 1940s and marched with Dr. Martin Luther King Jr. in the 1960s. She registered voters in Mississippi.

=== Women's Rights ===
She was instrumental in advancing the name of Geraldine Ferraro as the Democratic Party's nominee for Vice President of the United States in 1984. She supported many other women in politics, including the governor of Michigan, Jennifer M. Granholm. Ms. Jeffrey herself held one office, a position on the board of governors of Wayne State University in Detroit. She served for sixteen years (1974–1990), including three years as chairwoman.

== Awards ==
In 1983, Jeffrey was inducted into the Michigan Women's Hall of Fame for work in the labor movement and women's rights movement.

In 2000, when she was 90, Jeffrey was awarded the Presidential Medal of Freedom, the highest civilian honor, by former President Bill Clinton.

== Legacy ==
After her death, the United States Senate recognized Jeffrey with a resolution honoring her life and contributions.

Millie's papers are housed at the Walter P. Reuther Library at Wayne State University.
