= Erika Guevara Rosas =

Mexican-American human rights lawyer

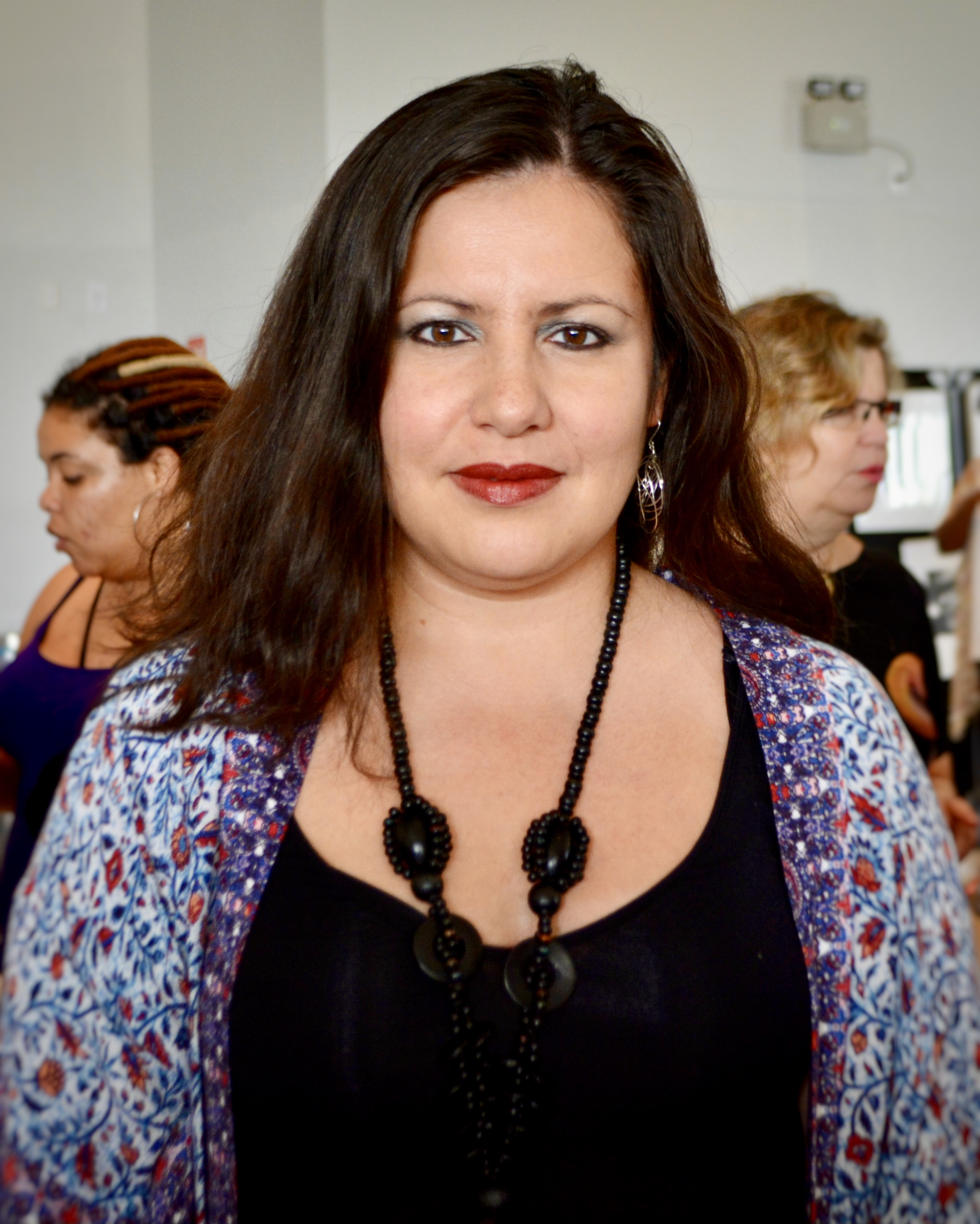
- Erika Guevara Rosas at AWID 2016
- Born: Erika Guevara Rosas; Unknown
- Education: York University
- Occupations: Lawyer, activist

Erika Guevara Rosas is a Mexican-American human rights lawyer and feminist, and the Senior Director for Research, Advocacy, Policy and Campaigns at Amnesty International (AI). Prior to her tenure with Amnesty International, she was the Americas Director at the Global Fund for Women.

== Education ==
Guevara Rosas has a master's degree in Women's Studies, a Post-Graduate degree in Migration and Refugee Studies from York University, and her LLB from Universidad de Londres.

== Affiliations ==
In May 2015, Erika joined activist Christine Ahn, Nobel Peace Prize Laureates Leymah Gbowee and Mairead Maguire, and thirty other participants in a peace march across the demilitarized zone separating North and South Korea.
