= Christine Ahn =

Korean activist

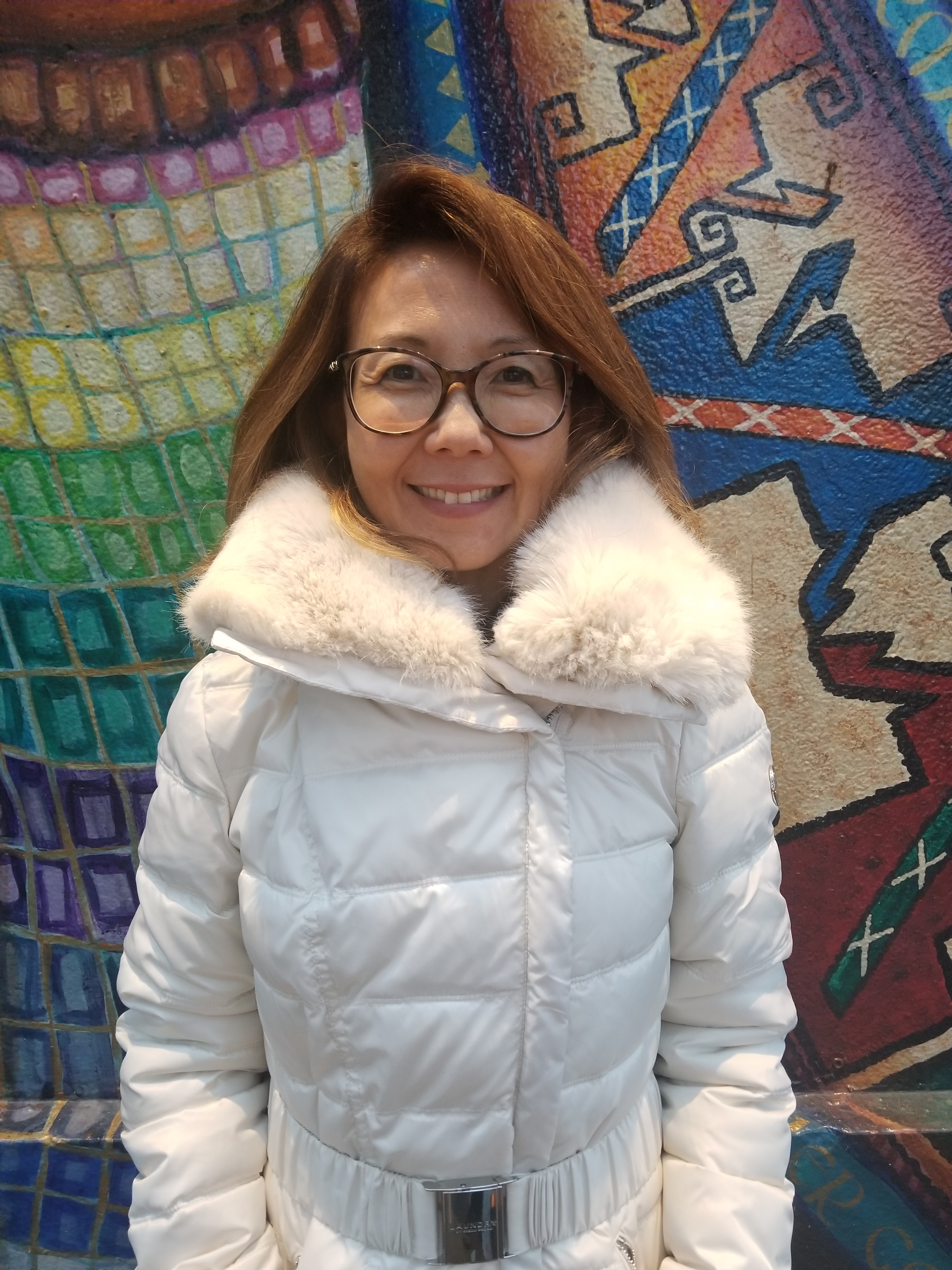
- Christine Ahn
- Born: South Korea
- Citizenship: American
- Education: University of Colorado; Georgetown University

- Christine Ahn
- Hangul: 안은희
- Hanja: 安銀姬
- Revised Romanization: An Eunhui
- McCune–Reischauer: An Ŭnhŭi

Christine Ahn is a Korean-American peace activist who serves as the Executive Director of Women Cross DMZ, an organization of women advocating for an end to the Korean War. In 2015, she led 30 international women peacemakers across the De-Militarized Zone (DMZ) from North Korea to South Korea. She is also the 2020 winner of The US Peace Prize for her work for peace on the Korean peninsula and her advocacy for women's leadership in peace-building efforts.

== Early life and education ==
Ahn was born in South Korea and immigrated to the United States at age three. She is the youngest of 10 children, and according to Ahn, her mother, who was the breadwinner of the family, grew up in Korea during the period of Japanese colonial rule and had a sixth-grade education.

Ahn graduated with a bachelor's degree in political science from the University of Colorado, Boulder in 1998, and she earned a master's degree in International Policy from Georgetown University and a certificate in ecological horticulture from the University of California, Santa Cruz.

Ahn is an American citizen and lives in Hawaii.

== Career ==
=== Korea Policy Institute and Korea Peace Now! Campaign ===
Ahn was a policy analyst with the Korea Policy Institute and the international coordinator or the Korea Peace Now! campaign, which Women Cross DMZ launched in 2019 with three feminist peace organizations: Women's International League for Peace and Freedom, Nobel Women's Initiative, and Korean Women's Movement for Peace.

=== Women Cross DMZ ===
Ahn is a co-founder and Executive Director of a non-profit group, Women Cross DMZ, which is known for organizing a group of thirty female activists in crossing the demilitarized zone (DMZ) between North and South Korea in 2015. Ahn and other activists, such as Gloria Steinem and Nobel Peace laureates, Mairead Maguire of Northern Ireland and Leymah Gbowee of Liberia, crossed the DMZ to bring attention to the need for peace between the two nations and for a formal declaration of the end of the Korean War. Critics have claimed that Ahn has not adequately addressed human rights violations committed by the North Korean government and that the event would be used for propaganda by the North Korean regime.

In 2017, Ahn was barred from entering South Korea on her way to China; the Justice Ministry of South Korea stated that Ahn was denied entry because of a concern that she could "hurt the national interests and public safety" of South Korea. Ahn said that her 2015 Women Cross DMZ campaign may have caused the conservative administration of President Park Geun-hye to put her on a blacklist.

=== Congressional and White House advocacy ===
In July 2023, on the 70th anniversary of the Korean Armistice, Ahn appeared at a DC press conference with House reps Barbara Lee (D-CA), Judy Chu (D-CA) and Delia Ramirez ( D-ILL) to support the Peace on the Korean Peninsula Act, legislation introduced by House rep Brad Sherman (D-CA) calling for a formal end to the Korean War. In an interview with the Washington Post, Ahn said, "We are still in a state of war, and as we see in the current growing tensions on the peninsula, with the U.S. sending three nuclear submarines and the massive military exercises and North Korea testing unprecedented numbers of missiles, we are just one step, one accident away from nuclear war."

In 2017, Ahn organized a letter writing campaign to the Trump administration with female activists from more than 40 countries to defuse tensions on the Korean peninsula and to express their concerns that inaction could lead to nuclear war.

Ahn is also a co-founder of Korean Americans for Fair Trade.

== Media ==
Ahn's OpEds have appeared in the New York Times, Washington Post and Time Magazine, and she is a regulator contributor on MSNBC Democracy Now! and CNN.

== Awards ==
Ah is the recipient of multiple awards, including the 2023 Certificate of Recognition from the Honolulu City and County Council, the 2022 Social Activist Award from the Nobel Peace Laureates, and the 2020 US Peace Prize from the US Peace Memorial Foundation.

== Selected writing ==
- Ahn, C., Park, T., and Richards, K., "Anti-Asian Violence in America Rooted in US Empire," The Nation, March 19, 2021
- Ahn, C., "For Biden, the answer to North Korea is now impossible to ignore," MSN, December 18, 2020
- Ahn, C., Susskind, Y., and Wiesner, C., "Opinion: Women of Color Should be the Ones Remaking U.S. Foreign Policy," Newsweek, November 17, 2020
- Ahn, C. and Steinem, G., "Opinion: Women marched for Korean reconciliation. Washington is in our way," The Washington Post, February 24, 2019
- Ahn, C., "While Two Koreas Talk, Trump is Throwing Shade," Foreign Policy in Focus, February 8, 2018
- Ahn, C., "Opinion: Unwanted Missiles for a Korean Island," The New York Times, August 5, 2011
