= Gloria Steinem =

American activist and journalist (1934–2026)

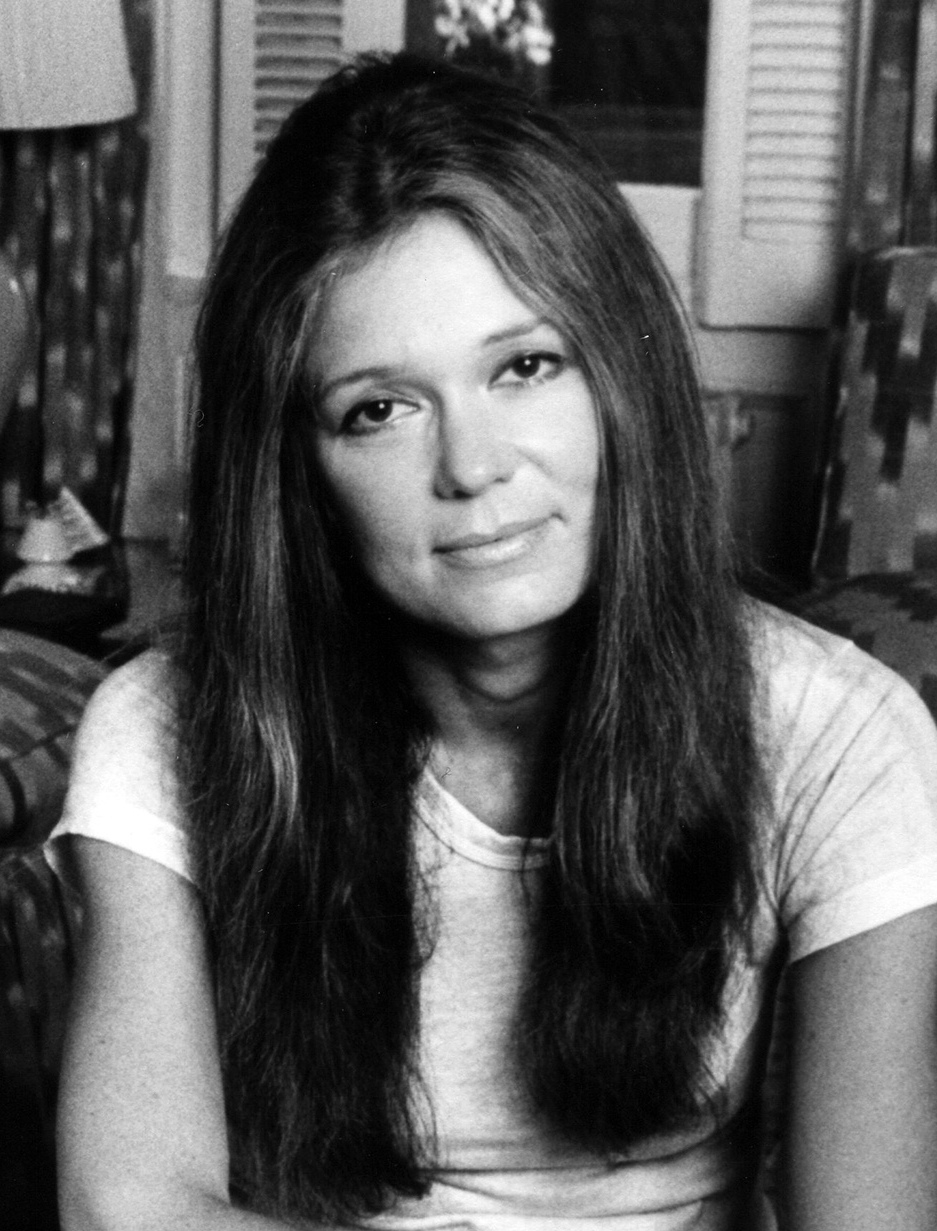
- Steinem in 1977
- Born: Gloria Marie Steinem; March 25, 1934; Toledo, Ohio, U.S.
- Died: September 2, 2026 (aged 92); New York City, U.S.
- Education: Smith College (BA)
- Occupations: Writer and journalist for Ms. and New York magazines
- Movement: Feminism
- Board member of: Women's Media Center
- Spouse: David Bale (m. 2000; died 2003)
- Relatives: Susanne Steinem Patch (sister); Pauline Perlmutter Steinem (grandmother); Christian Bale (stepson)
- Website: www.gloriasteinem.com

Signature
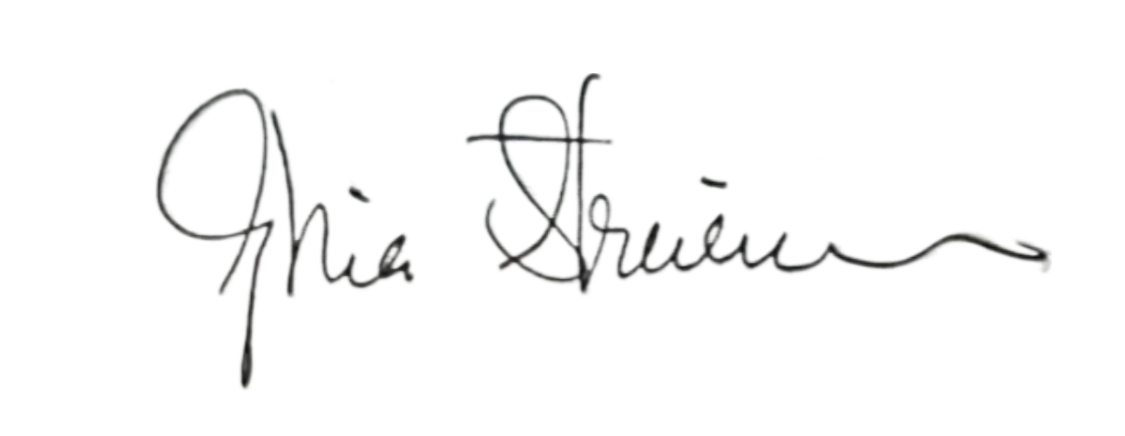

Gloria Marie Steinem (/ˈstaɪnəm/ STY-nəm; March 25, 1934 – September 2, 2026) was an American journalist and social movement activist who emerged as a nationally recognized leader of second-wave feminism in the United States in the late 1960s and early 1970s, and who remained particularly prominent in the 1980s and early 1990s.

Steinem was a columnist for New York magazine and co-founder of Ms. magazine. In 1969, she published "After Black Power, Women's Liberation", an article that brought her national attention and positioned her as a feminist leader. In 1971, she co-founded the National Women's Political Caucus, which provided training and support for women seeking elected and appointed office. Also in 1971, she co-founded the Women's Action Alliance, which until 1997 supported a network of feminist activists and worked to advance feminist causes and legislation. In 1992, Steinem helped establish Take Our Daughters to Work Day, an occasion for young girls to learn about future career opportunities. In 2005, Steinem, Jane Fonda, and Robin Morgan co-founded the Women's Media Center, an organization that "works to make women visible and powerful in the media".

She traveled internationally as an organizer and lecturer and was a media spokeswoman on issues of equality. In 2015, Steinem, alongside two Nobel Peace laureates (Mairead Maguire of Northern Ireland and Leymah Gbowee of Liberia) and other prominent women peace activists, undertook a journey from the capital of North Korea, Pyongyang, to South Korea, crossing the Korean Demilitarized Zone.

== Early life and education ==
Gloria Marie Steinem was born on March 25, 1934, in Toledo, Ohio, to Ruth (née Nuneviller) and Leo Steinem. Her mother was Presbyterian, mostly of German (including Prussian) and some Scottish descent. Her father was Jewish, the son of immigrants from Württemberg, Germany, and Radziejów, Poland. Her paternal grandmother, Pauline Perlmutter Steinem, chaired the educational committee of the National Woman Suffrage Association, was a delegate to the 1908 International Council of Women, and was the first woman to be elected to the Toledo Board of Education. She was also a leader in the movement for vocational education and at a time when it cost $500 to get a Jew out of Germany, she rescued many members of her family from the Holocaust.

The Steinems lived and traveled in a trailer, from which Leo carried out his trade as a roaming antiques dealer. Before Gloria was born, her mother, Ruth, then age 34, had (according to Steinem) "a 'nervous breakdown', as [Ruth] and everyone else called it" that left her an invalid, trapped in delusional fantasies that sometimes turned violent. Steinem said that Ruth changed "from an energetic, fun-loving, book-loving" woman into "someone who was afraid to be alone, who could not hang on to reality long enough to hold a job, and who could rarely concentrate enough to read a book". Ruth spent long periods in and out of sanatoriums for the mentally ill. Steinem was ten years old when her parents separated in 1944. Her father went to California to find work, while she and her mother continued to live together in Toledo.

Although her parents divorced under the strain of her mother's illness, Steinem did not attribute it to male chauvinism. She said she "understood and never blamed him for the breakup". The impact of these events shaped her personality. Her father, a traveling salesman, had never provided financial stability, and his departure aggravated their situation. Steinem concluded that her mother's inability to hold a job reflected broader hostility toward working women. She also believed that doctors' apathy toward her mother stemmed from similar anti-woman animus. Years later, Steinem described her mother's experience as pivotal to her understanding of social injustices. These perspectives convinced Steinem that women lacked social and political equality.

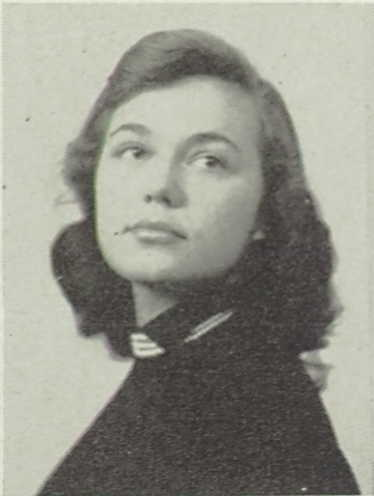
Steinem at Waite High School in 1951

Steinem attended Waite High School in Toledo and Western High School in Washington, D.C., graduating from the latter in 1952 while living with her older sister Susanne Steinem Patch. She then studied government at Smith College, an institution from which she received her A.B. magna cum laude and graduated Phi Beta Kappa in 1956.

In 1957, Steinem had an abortion. She was referred for the procedure by Dr. John Sharpe, a British physician. Years later, Steinem dedicated her memoir My Life on the Road (2015) to him. She wrote, "Dr. John Sharpe of London, who in 1957, a decade before physicians in England could legally perform an abortion for any reason other than the health of the woman, took the considerable risk of referring for an abortion a twenty-two-year-old American on her way to India. Knowing only that she had broken an engagement at home to seek an unknown fate, he said, 'You must promise me two things. First, you will not tell anyone my name. Second, you will do what you want to do with your life.'"

In the late 1950s, Steinem spent two years in India as a Chester Bowles Asian Fellow. She was influenced by Mahatma Gandhi and later modeled her campaign work after Gandhi's independence movement. After returning to the United States, she served as director of the Independent Research Service, an organization funded by foundations that were turn funded in secret by the CIA. She worked to send non-communist American students to the 1959 World Youth Festival. In 1960, she was hired by Warren Publishing as the first employee of Help! magazine.

== Journalism ==
Esquire magazine features editor Clay Felker gave freelance writer Steinem what she later called her first "serious assignment", regarding contraception; he did not like her first draft and had her re-write the article. Her resulting 1962 article about the way in which women are forced to choose between a career and marriage preceded Betty Friedan's book The Feminine Mystique by one year.

In 1963, while working on an article for Huntington Hartford's Show magazine, Steinem was employed as a Playboy Bunny at the New York Playboy Club. The resulting article, published in 1963 as "A Bunny's Tale", featured a photo of Steinem in Bunny uniform and detailed how women were treated at those clubs. Steinem maintained that she was proud of the work she did publicizing the exploitative working conditions of the Bunnies and especially the sexual demands made of them, which skirted the edge of the law. For a brief period after the article was published, Steinem was unable to land other assignments; in her words, this was "because [she] had now become a Bunny—and it didn't matter why". In response to the article, Hugh Hefner, the owner of Playboy, wrote a letter stating he would remove requirements for Bunnies to get gynecological exams and STD testing.

In the interim, Steinem conducted an interview with John Lennon for Cosmopolitan magazine in 1964. In 1965, she wrote for NBC-TV's weekly satirical revue, That Was the Week That Was (TW3), contributing a regular segment entitled "Surrealism in Everyday Life". Steinem eventually landed a job at Felker's newly founded New York magazine in 1968.

In 1969, Steinem covered for New York magazine an abortion speak-out that was held in a church basement in Greenwich Village, New York. Steinem had had an abortion in London at the age of 22. She felt what she called a "big click" at the speak-out, and later said she didn't "begin my life as an active feminist" until that day.

As she recalled, "It [abortion] is supposed to make us a bad person. But I must say, I never felt that. I used to sit and try and figure out how old the child would be, trying to make myself feel guilty. But I never could! I think the person who said: 'Honey, if men could get pregnant, abortion would be a sacrament' was right. Speaking for myself, I knew it was the first time I had taken responsibility for my own life. I wasn't going to let things happen to me. I was going to direct my life, and therefore it felt positive. But still, I didn't tell anyone. Because I knew that out there it wasn't [positive]." She also said, "In later years, if I'm remembered at all it will be for inventing a phrase like 'reproductive freedom' ... as a phrase it includes the freedom to have children or not to. So it makes it possible for us to make a coalition."

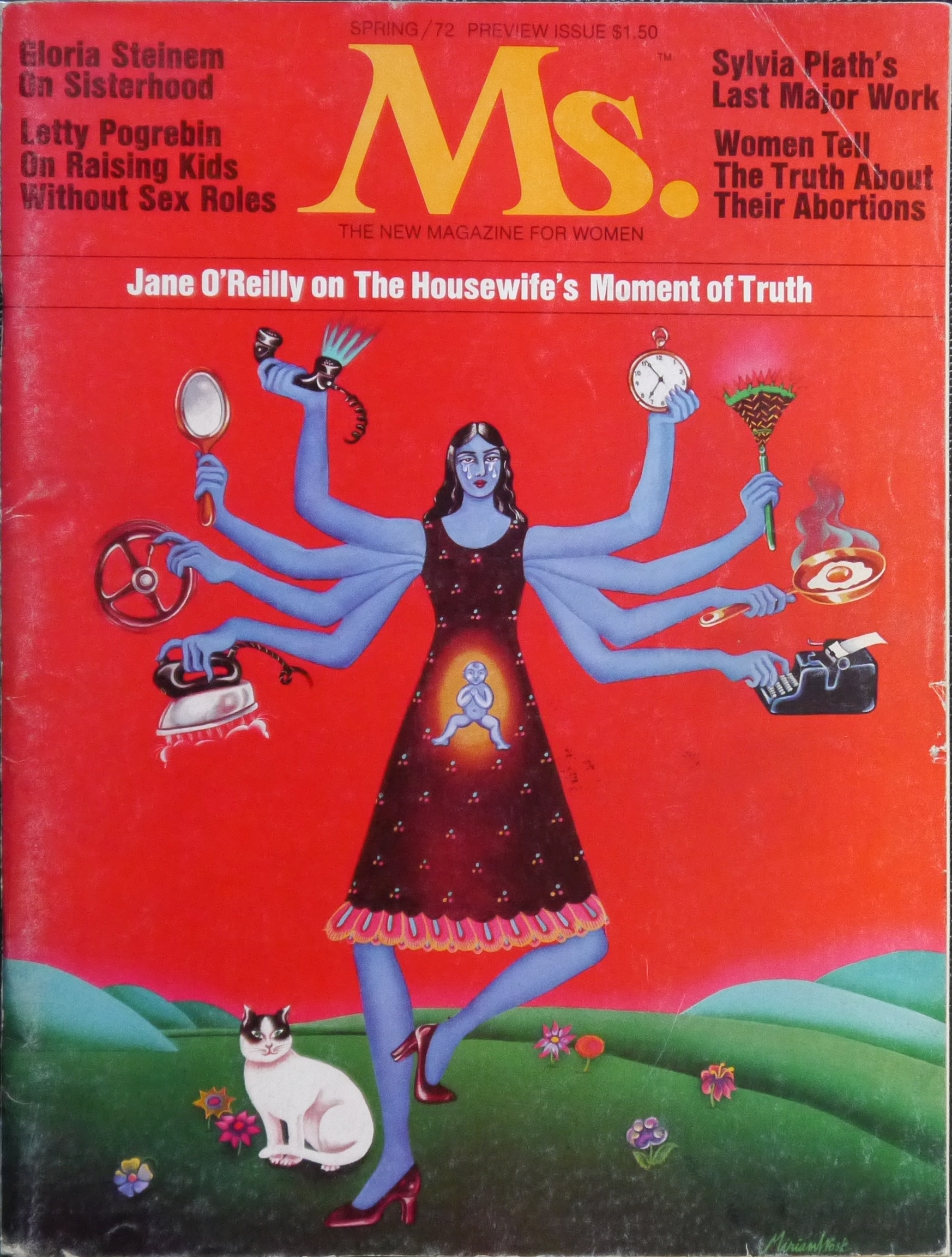
The first issue of Ms., released in 1972

In 1972, Steinem co-founded the feminist magazine Ms. alongside founding editors Letty Cottin Pogrebin, Mary Thom, Pat Carbine, Joanne Edgar, Nina Finkelstein, Dorothy Pitman Hughes, and Mary Peacock; it began as a special edition of New York, and Clay Felker funded the first issue. Its 300,000 test copies sold out nationwide in eight days. Within weeks, Ms. had received 26,000 subscription orders and more than 20,000 reader letters.

On January 24, 1972, Steinem spoke at the National Press Club.

In 1974, Ms. collaborated with public television to produce the television program Woman Alive!, and Steinem was featured in the first episode in her role as co-founder of Ms. magazine. The magazine was sold to the Feminist Majority Foundation in 2001; Steinem remains on the masthead as one of six founding editors and served on the advisory board.

Steinem spoke at the 1977 National Women's Conference among other speakers, including Rosalynn Carter, Betty Ford, Lady Bird Johnson, Bella Abzug, Barbara Jordan, Cecilia Burciaga, Lenore Hershey, and Jean O'Leary.

In 1978, Steinem wrote a semi-satirical essay for Cosmopolitan titled "If Men Could Menstruate" in which she imagined a world where men menstruate instead of women. She concluded in the essay that in such a world, menstruation would become a badge of honor with men comparing their relative sufferings, rather than the source of shame that it had been for women.

On March 22, 1998, Steinem published an op-ed in The New York Times ("Feminists and the Clinton Question") in which she claimed that Bill Clinton's alleged behavior did not constitute sexual harassment, although she did not actually challenge the accounts by his accusers. The op-ed was criticized by various writers, as in the Harvard Crimson and in the Times itself. In 2017, Steinem, in an interview with the British newspaper The Guardian, stood by her 1998 New York Times op-ed, but also said: "I wouldn't write the same thing now."

== Activism ==
=== Early activism (1968–1976) ===
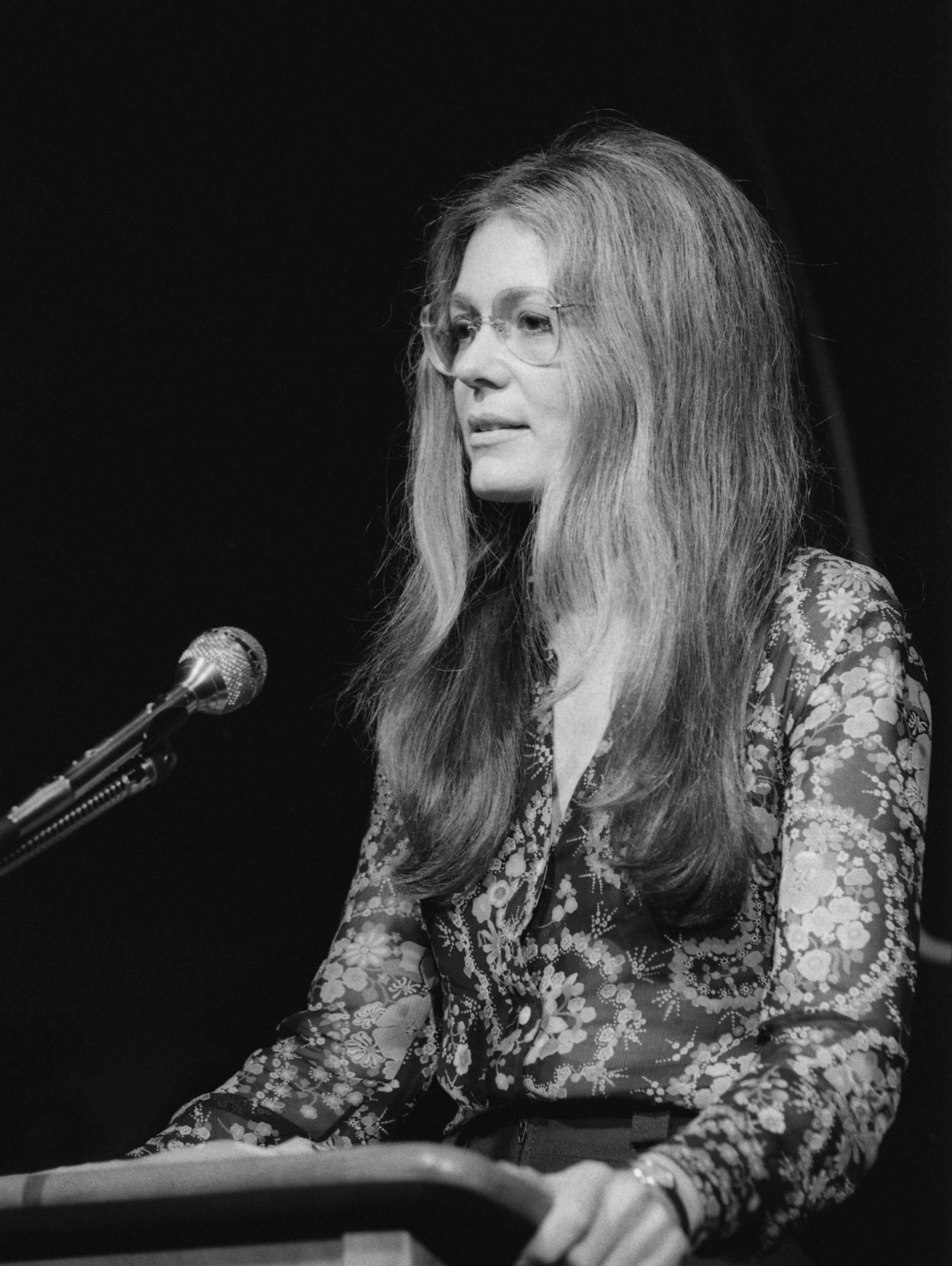
Steinem at the LBJ Library in 1975

In 1968, Steinem signed the "Writers and Editors War Tax Protest" pledge, vowing to refuse tax payments in protest against the Vietnam War. The following year, her article "After Black Power, Women's Liberation" brought her to national fame as a feminist leader. As such she campaigned for the Equal Rights Amendment, testifying before the U.S. Senate Judiciary Committee in its favor in 1970. That same year she published her essay on a utopia of gender equality, "What It Would Be Like If Women Win", in Time magazine.

On July 10, 1971, Steinem was one of more than three hundred women who founded the National Women's Political Caucus (NWPC), also including such notables as Bella Abzug, Betty Friedan, Shirley Chisholm, and Myrlie Evers-Williams. As a co-convener of the Caucus, she delivered the speech "Address to the Women of America", stating in part:

This is no simple reform. It really is a revolution. Sex and race because they are easy and visible differences have been the primary ways of organizing human beings into superior and inferior groups and into the cheap labor on which this system still depends. We are talking about a society in which there will be no roles other than those chosen or those earned. We are really talking about humanism.

In 1972, she ran as a delegate for Shirley Chisholm in New York, but lost. In March of the following year, she addressed the first national conference of Stewardesses for Women's Rights, which she continued to support until it folded in the spring of 1976.

Steinem, who grew up reading Wonder Woman comics, was also a key player in the restoration of Wonder Woman's powers and traditional costume, which were restored in issue #204 (January–February 1973). Steinem, offended that the most famous female superhero had been depowered, had placed Wonder Woman (in costume) on the cover of the first issue of Ms. (1972)—Warner Communications, DC Comics' owner, was also an investor in Ms.—which also contained an appreciative essay about the character. In doing so, Steinem forced the firing of Samuel R. Delany who had taken over scripting duties with issue #202. Delany was supposed to write a six-issue story arc, which would culminate in a battle over an abortion clinic where Wonder Woman was to defend women trying to use their services. The story outlines and the work already done on the issues were scrapped, something that Steinem was not aware of and made no attempt to rectify.

In 1976, the first women-only Passover seder was held in Esther M. Broner's New York City apartment and led by Broner, with 13 women attending, including Steinem.

=== Later activism (1980s–1990s) ===
In 1984, Steinem was arrested along with a number of members of Congress and civil rights activists for disorderly conduct outside the South African embassy while protesting against the South African apartheid system.

At the outset of the Gulf War in 1991, Steinem, along with prominent feminists Robin Morgan and Kate Millett, publicly opposed a U.S. war in the Middle East and asserted the ostensible goal of "defending democracy" was a pretense. That same year, she voiced strong support for Anita Hill during the Clarence Thomas hearings and predicted that one day Hill herself would sit on the Supreme Court.

In 1992, Steinem co-founded Choice USA, a non-profit organization that mobilizes and provides ongoing support to a younger generation that lobbies for reproductive choice. The following year, she co-produced and narrated an Emmy Award-winning TV documentary for HBO about child abuse, called "Multiple Personalities: The Search for Deadly Memories". Also in 1993, she and Rosilyn Heller co-produced an original TV movie for Lifetime, "Better Off Dead", which examined the parallel forces that both oppose abortion and support the death penalty.

Despite her influence in the feminist movement, Steinem also drew criticism from some feminists, who questioned whether she was committed to the movement or using it to promote her glamorous image. The Redstockings also singled her out for agreeing to cooperate with the CIA-backed Independent Research Service. It was also claimed that Steinem worked as a CIA agent when this operation was taking place. According to an article released to the public from the CIA Library, Steinem's foundation was financed by foundations that were in turn financed by the CIA. However, the article does not describe her as a CIA agent.

Steinem was an active supporter of the accusations of Satanic ritual abuse of children based on supposedly recovered memories in the 1980s and 1990s. She promoted Bennett Braun, a leading advocate of this conspiracy theory, and the accusations in the McMartin preschool case, and even funded an excavation of the latter's site intended to find evidence of abuse. In 1993 Ms. magazine, which she still edited, published a pseudonymous cover story arguing that "Satanic ritual abuse exists", and she even directed some of her self-help writing at "women who had recovered memories of 'ritual or cult abuse'".

=== International activism on behalf of women ===
On June 1, 2013, Steinem was a presenter at the "Chime For Change: The Sound Of Change Live" Concert at Twickenham Stadium in London, England. Later in 2014, UN Women began its commemoration of the 20th anniversary of the Fourth World Conference on Women, and as part of that campaign Steinem (and others) spoke at the Apollo Theater in New York City. Chime For Change was funded by Gucci, focusing on using innovative approaches to raise funds and awareness especially regarding girls and women.

Steinem stated, "I think the fact that I've become a symbol for the women's movement is somewhat accidental. A woman member of Congress, for example, might be identified as a member of Congress; it doesn't mean she's any less of a feminist but she's identified by her nearest male analog. Well, I don't have a male analog so the press has to identify me with the movement. I suppose I could be referred to as a journalist, but because Ms. is part of a movement and not just a typical magazine, I'm more likely to be identified with the movement. There's no other slot to put me in."

Contrary to popular belief, Steinem did not coin the feminist slogan "A woman needs a man like a fish needs a bicycle". Although she helped popularize it, the phrase is actually attributable to Irina Dunn. When Time magazine published an article attributing the saying to Steinem, Steinem wrote a letter saying the phrase had been coined by Dunn. Another phrase sometimes wrongly attributed to Steinem is: "If men could get pregnant, abortion would be a sacrament." Steinem herself attributed it to "an old Irish woman taxi driver in Boston", whom she said she and Florynce Kennedy met.

On May 24, 2015, International Women's Day for Disarmament, thirty women, including two Nobel Peace Prize laureates from 15 countries, linked arms with 10,000 Korean women, stationing themselves on both sides of the Korean Demilitarized Zone (DMZ) to urge a formal end to the Korean War (1950–1953), the reunification of families divided during the war, and a peace-building process with women in leadership positions to resolve seventy years of hostility following World War II. It was unusual for South Korea and North Korea to reach consensus on allowing peace activists to enter the tense border area, one of the world's most dangerous places, where hundreds of thousands of troops are stationed in a heavily mined zone that divides South Korea from nuclear North Korea.

In addition to Steinem, participants in crossing the DMZ included organizer Christine Ahn from Hawaii; feminist Suzuyo Takazato from Okinawa; Amnesty International human rights lawyer Erika Guevara of Mexico; Liberian peace and reconciliation advocate Leymah Gbowee; Philippines lawmaker Liza Maza; Northern Ireland peace activist Mairead Maguire and Colonel Ann Wright, a retired officer who resigned from the U.S. military to protest the U.S. invasion of Iraq.

Steinem was the honorary co-chairwoman of 2015 Women's Walk For Peace In Korea with Mairead Maguire; in the weeks leading up to the walk, Steinem told the press, "It's hard to imagine any more physical symbol of the insanity of dividing human beings." The group's main goal is to advocate disarmament and seek Korean reunification. It will be holding international peace symposiums both in Pyongyang and Seoul in which women from both North Korea and South Korea can share experiences and ideas of mobilizing women to stop the Korean crisis. It is especially believed that the role of women in this act would help and support the reunification of family members divided by the split prolonged for 70 years.

She was also the chair of the advisory board of Apne Aap Women Worldwide, an organization fighting sex trafficking and inter-generational prostitution in India, founded by Ruchira Gupta. She also wrote extensively on her travels, experiences with women and the Indian feminist movement with her colleague and friend Gupta. In 2014, Steinem and Gupta traveled through India to meet the country's young feminists, writers, and thought leaders. A diary was kept documenting their travels, "Notes on A Tour of the Indian Women's Movement".

From 2011 on, Steinem was one of the co-conveners of the Frontline Women's Fund, a project of the Sisterhood Is Global Institute along with former UN High Commissioner for Human Rights Navi Pillay and Jessica Neuwirth. The Frontline Women's Fund is a fund for women that strengthens frontline women's rights activists around the world by increasing their access to financial resources, political leaders, and media visibility. As of 2025, they support 28 partner organizations in 13 countries and manage four thematic funds including the Gloria Steinem Equality Fund to End Sex Trafficking with 13 grantees and the Efua Dorkenoo Fund to End Female Genital Mutilation (FGM) with seven grantees.

== Involvement in political campaigns ==
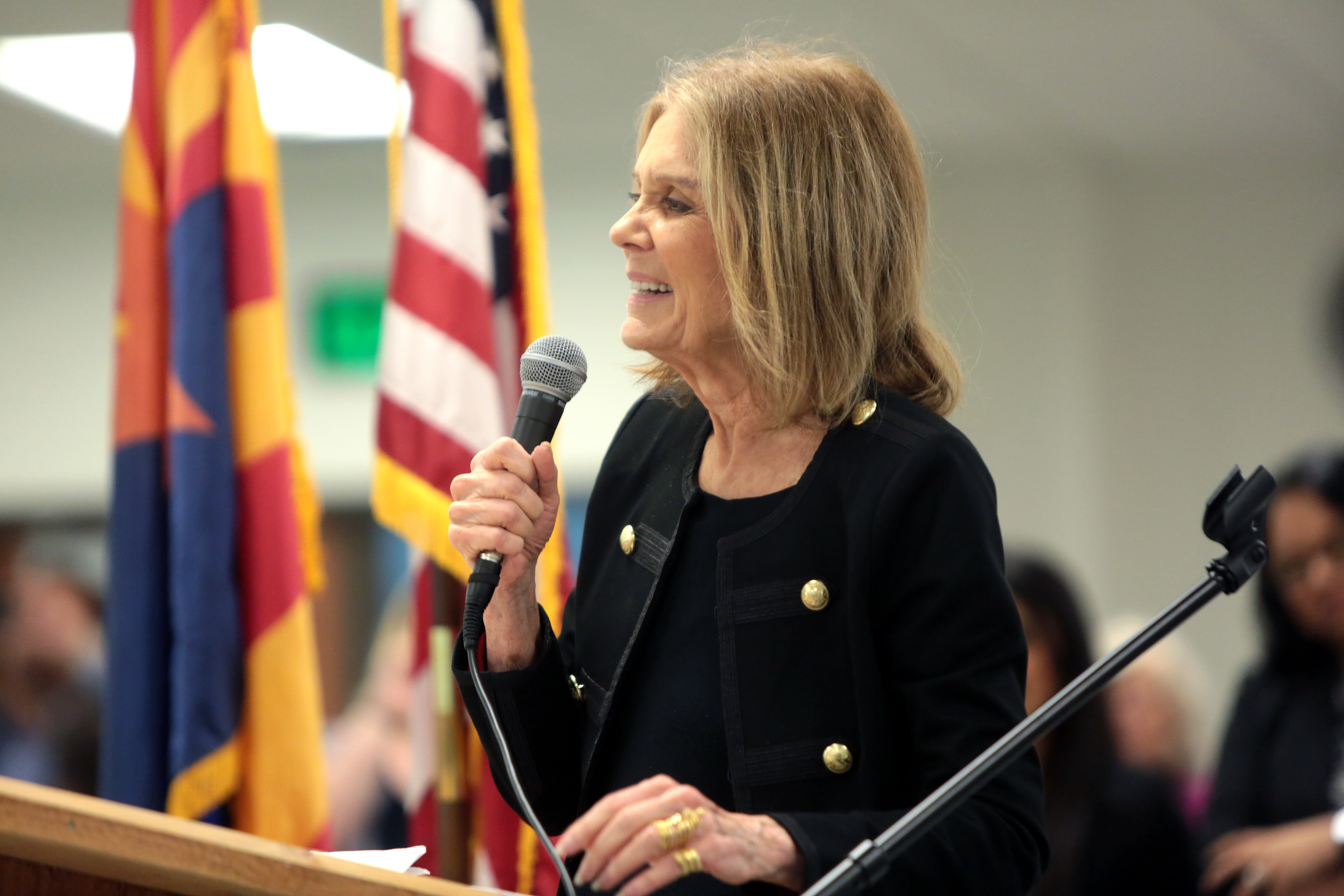
Steinem speaking with supporters at the Women Together Arizona Summit at Carpenters Local Union in Phoenix, Arizona, September 2016

Steinem's involvement in presidential campaigns stretched back to her support of Adlai Stevenson in the 1952 presidential campaign.

=== 1968 election ===
A proponent of civil rights and fierce critic of the Vietnam War, Steinem was initially drawn to Senator Eugene McCarthy because of his "admirable record" on those issues, but after meeting him and hearing him speak, she found him "cautious, uninspired, and dry". As the campaign progressed, Steinem became baffled at "personally vicious" attacks that McCarthy leveled against his primary opponent Robert F. Kennedy, even as "his real opponent, Hubert Humphrey, went free".

On a late-night radio show, Steinem garnered attention for declaring "George McGovern is the real Eugene McCarthy". In 1968, Steinem was chosen to pitch the arguments to McGovern as to why he should enter the presidential race that year; he agreed, and Steinem "consecutively or simultaneously served as pamphlet writer, advance 'man', fund raiser, lobbyist of delegates, errand runner, and press secretary".

McGovern lost the nomination at the 1968 Democratic National Convention, and Steinem later wrote of her astonishment at Hubert Humphrey's "refusal even to suggest to Chicago Mayor Richard J. Daley that he control the rampaging police and the bloodshed in the streets".

=== 1972 election ===
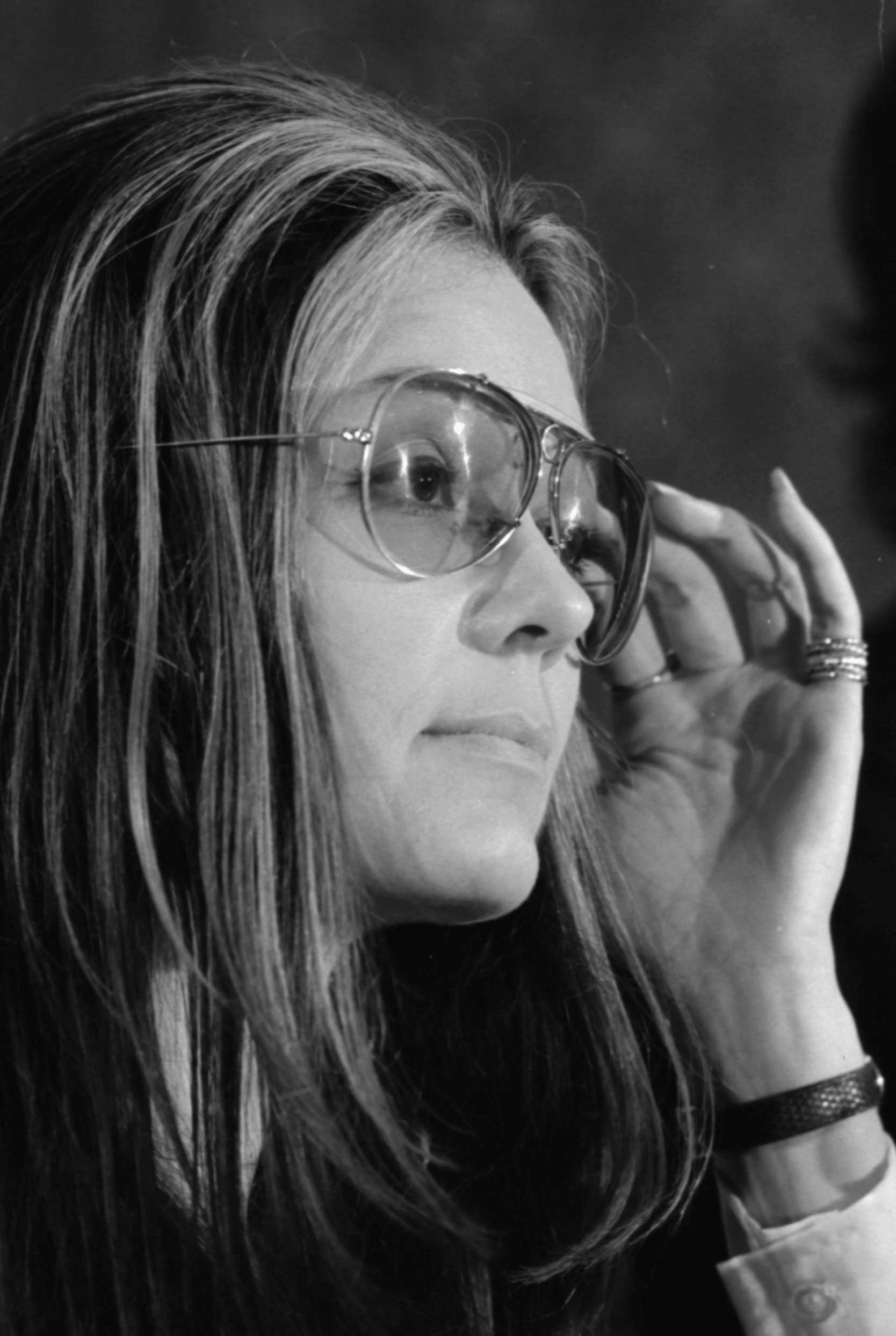
At the Women's Action Alliance news conference, January 1972

Steinem was reluctant to re-join the McGovern campaign, as although she had brought in McGovern's single largest campaign contributor in 1968, she "still had been treated like a frivolous pariah by much of McGovern's campaign staff". In April 1972, Steinem remarked that he "still doesn't understand the Women's Movement".

McGovern ultimately excised the abortion issue from the party's platform, and recent publications show McGovern was deeply conflicted on the issue. Steinem later wrote this description of the events:

The consensus of the meeting of women delegates held by the caucus had been to fight for the minority plank on reproductive freedom; indeed our vote had supported the plank nine to one. So fight we did, with three women delegates speaking eloquently in its favor as a constitutional right. One male Right-to-Life zealot spoke against, and Shirley MacLaine also was an opposition speaker, on the grounds that this was a fundamental right but didn't belong in the platform. We made a good showing. Clearly we would have won if McGovern's forces had left their delegates uninstructed and thus able to vote their consciences.

However, Germaine Greer flatly contradicted Steinem's account, reporting, "Jacqui Ceballos called from the crowd to demand abortion rights on the Democratic platform, but Bella [Abzug] and Gloria stared glassily out into the room, thus killing the abortion rights platform", and asking "Why had Bella and Gloria not helped Jacqui to nail him on abortion? What reticence, what loserism had afflicted them?" Steinem later recalled that the 1972 Convention was the only time Greer and Steinem ever met.

The cover of Harper's that month read, "Womanlike, they did not want to get tough with their man, and so, womanlike, they got screwed".

=== 2004 election ===
In the run-up to the 2004 election, Steinem voiced fierce criticism of the George W. Bush administration, asserting, "There has never been an administration that has been more hostile to women's equality, to reproductive freedom as a fundamental human right, and has acted on that hostility", adding, "If he is elected in 2004, abortion will be criminalized in this country." At a Planned Parenthood event in Boston, Steinem declared Bush "a danger to health and safety", citing his antagonism to the Clean Water Act, reproductive freedom, sex education, and AIDS relief.

=== 2008 election ===
Steinem was an active participant in the 2008 presidential campaign, and praised both the Democratic front-runners, commenting,

Both Senators Clinton and Obama are civil rights advocates, feminists, environmentalists, and critics of the war in Iraq ... Both have resisted pandering to the right, something that sets them apart from any Republican candidate, including John McCain. Both have Washington and foreign policy experience; George W. Bush did not when he first ran for president.

Nevertheless, Steinem endorsed Senator Hillary Clinton, citing her broader experience, and saying that the nation was in such bad shape it might require two terms of Clinton and two of Obama to fix it.

She also made headlines for a New York Times op-ed in which she cited gender and not race as "probably the most restricting force in American life". She elaborated, "Black men were given the vote a half-century before women of any race were allowed to mark a ballot, and generally have ascended to positions of power, from the military to the boardroom, before any women."

Steinem again drew attention for, according to the New York Observer, seeming "to denigrate the importance of John McCain's time as a prisoner of war in Vietnam"; Steinem's broader argument "was that the media and the political world are too admiring of militarism in all its guises".

Following McCain's selection of Sarah Palin as his running mate, Steinem penned an op-ed in which she labeled Palin an "unqualified woman" who "opposes everything most other women want and need", described her nomination speech as "divisive and deceptive", called for a more inclusive Republican Party, and concluded that Palin resembled "Phyllis Schlafly, only younger".

=== 2016 election ===
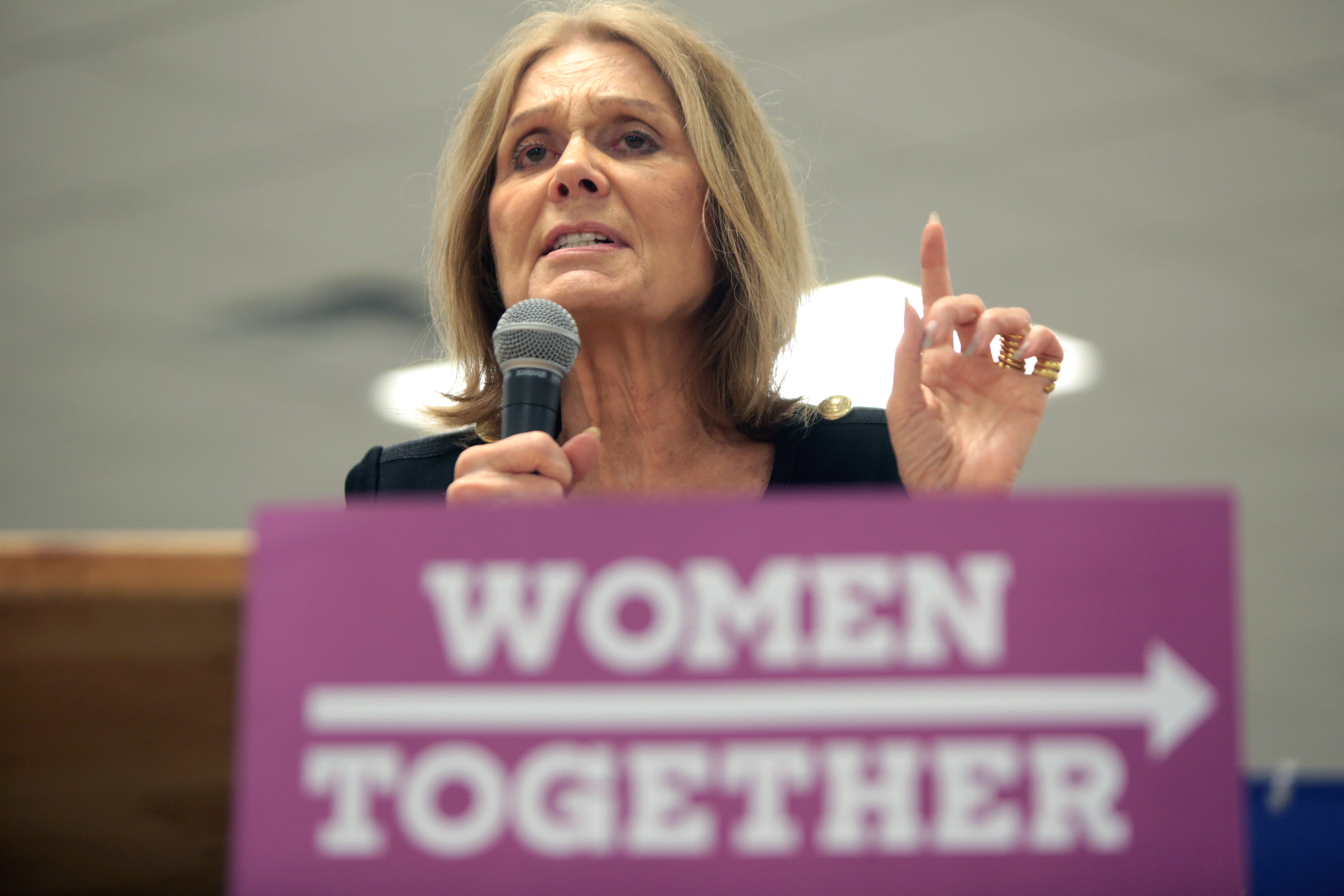
Steinem at an event campaigning for Democratic nominee Hillary Clinton in September 2016

In an HBO interview with Bill Maher, Steinem, when asked to explain the broad support for Bernie Sanders among young Democratic women, responded, "When you're young, you're thinking, 'Where are the boys? The boys are with Bernie.'" Her comments triggered widespread criticism, and Steinem later issued an apology and said her comments had been "misinterpreted".

Steinem endorsed Democratic candidate Hillary Clinton in the run-up for the 2016 U.S. presidential election, despite being an honorary chair of the Democratic Socialists of America (who endorsed Bernie Sanders); the position of honorary co-chair was subsequently abolished in 2017. Steinem was an honorary co-chair of and speaker at the Women's March on Washington on January 21, 2017, the day after the inauguration of Donald Trump as president.

== CIA ties and leader of Independent Research Service ==
In 1967, Steinem revealed in an interview with The New York Times that she had worked full time from 1958 until 1962 at the Independent Research Service, which was financed by foundations that were in turn financed by the CIA. As director of the Independent Research Service, Steinem had helped to organize groups of young people to attend World Youth Festivals in Vienna in 1959 and Helsinki in 1962.

In May 1975, Redstockings, a radical feminist group, published a report put together for the Independent Research Service by Steinem and others on the Vienna Youth Festival and its attendees. Redstockings raised the question of whether Steinem had continuing ties with the CIA, which Steinem denied.

Steinem defended her relationship with the CIA, saying: "In my experience the agency was completely different from its image; it was liberal, nonviolent and honorable." (Note: An article in The New Yorker magazine backs up her description about the CIA group working with foundations to address the rise of Communism in other countries. In the magazine's article, A Friend of the Devil by Louis Menand, the author states that "One customary explanation is that the people who ran covert operations at the C.I.A. from 1947 to 1967 were not right-wing jingoists. They were liberal anti-Communists, veterans of Roosevelt’s Office of Strategic Services, the forerunner of the C.I.A. They were good guys who despised the Soviet Union as a traitor to progressive principles.") Steinem also stated that she considered the CIA to be allies in promoting U.S. government policy against communism during the early Cold War.

== Political positions ==
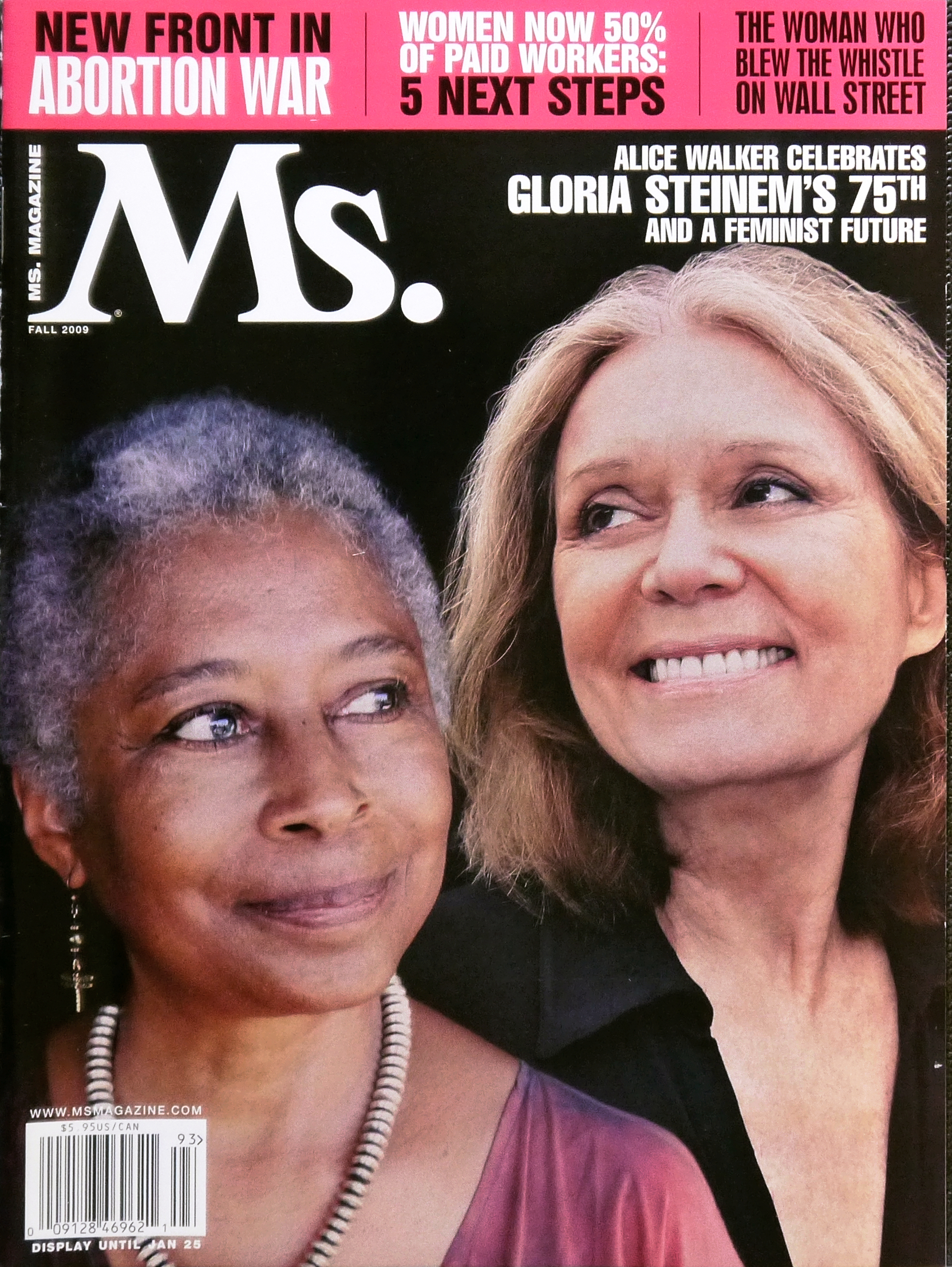
Gloria Steinem (right) and Alice Walker celebrate Steinem's 75th birthday in the Fall 2009 issue of Ms.

Although most frequently considered a liberal feminist, Steinem repeatedly characterized herself as a radical feminist. She repudiated categorization within feminism as "nonconstructive to specific problems", saying: "I've turned up in every category. So it makes it harder for me to take the divisions with great seriousness." Nevertheless, on concrete issues, Steinem staked several firm positions.

=== Female genital mutilation ===
In 1979, Steinem wrote the article on female genital mutilation that brought the subject into the United States public's consciousness. Her article, "The International Crime of Female Genital Mutilation" appeared in the March 1979 issue of Ms. It reported on the "75 million women suffering with the results of genital mutilation". Steinem argued that "the real reasons for genital mutilation can only be understood in the context of the patriarchy: men must control women's bodies as the means of production, and thus repress the independent power of women's sexuality."

Steinem's article contained the basic arguments that were later developed by philosopher Martha Nussbaum.

=== Feminist theory ===
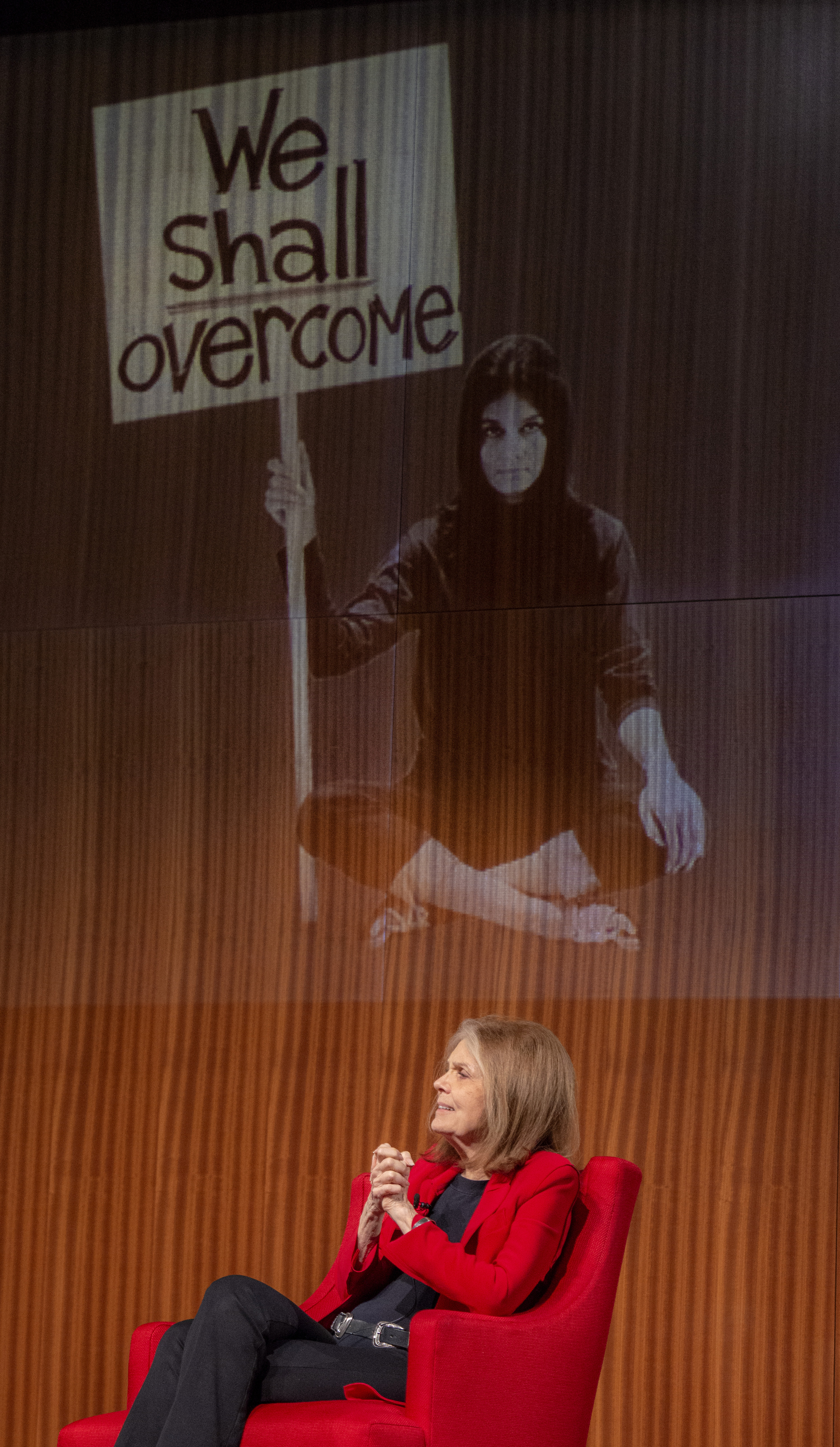
Steinem at the LBJ Library in 2019

Steinem frequently voiced her disapproval of the obscurantism and abstractions some claimed were prevalent in feminist academic theorizing. She said, "Nobody cares about feminist academic writing. That's careerism. These poor women in academia have to talk this silly language that nobody can understand in order to be accepted [...] But I recognize the fact that we have this ridiculous system of tenure, that the whole thrust of academia is one that values education, in my opinion, in inverse ratio to its usefulness—and what you write in inverse relationship to its understandability."

She later singled out deconstructionists like Judith Butler for criticism, saying, "I always wanted to put a sign up on the road to Yale saying, 'Beware: Deconstruction Ahead'. Academics are forced to write in language no one can understand so that they get tenure. They have to say 'discourse', not 'talk'. Knowledge that is not accessible is not helpful. It becomes aerialised—and I think it's important that women's experiences be given a narrative."

=== Kinsey Reports ===
In addition to feminism, Steinem was a prominent advocate for analyzing the Kinsey Reports.

=== Pornography ===
Steinem criticized pornography, which she distinguished from erotica. She wrote that "erotica is as different from pornography as love is from rape, as dignity is from humiliation, as partnership is from slavery, as pleasure is from pain". Her argument hinges on the distinction between reciprocity versus domination. "Blatant or subtle, pornography involves no equal power or mutuality. In fact, much of the tension and drama comes from the clear idea that one person is dominating the other."

On the issue of same-sex pornography, Steinem asserted that "Whatever the gender of the participants, all pornography including male-male gay pornography is an imitation of the male-female, conqueror-victim paradigm, and almost all of it actually portrays or implies enslaved women and master." She also called "snuff films" a serious threat to women.

=== Same-sex marriage ===
In an essay published in Time on August 31, 1970, "What It Would Be Like If Women Win", Steinem wrote about same-sex marriage in the context of the "Utopian" future she envisioned:

What will exist is a variety of alternative life-styles. Since the population explosion dictates that childbearing be kept to a minimum, parents-and-children will be only one of many "families": couples, age groups, working groups, mixed communes, blood-related clans, class groups, creative groups. Single women will have the right to stay single without ridicule, without the attitudes now betrayed by "spinster" and "bachelor." Lesbians or homosexuals will no longer be denied legally binding marriages, complete with mutual-support agreements and inheritance rights. Paradoxically, the number of homosexuals may get smaller. With fewer over-possessive mothers and fewer fathers who hold up an impossibly cruel or perfectionist idea of manhood, boys will be less likely to be denied or reject their identity as males.

Although Steinem did not mention or advocate same-sex marriage in published works or interviews for more than three decades, she again expressed support in the early 2000s. In 2004, she stated that "[the] idea that sexuality is only okay if it ends in reproduction oppresses women—whose health depends on separating sexuality from reproduction—as well as gay men and lesbians." She was also a signatory of the 2006 manifesto, "Beyond Same-Sex Marriage: A New Strategic Vision For All Our Families and Relationships", which advocates extending legal rights and privileges to a wide range of relationships, households, and families.

=== Transgender rights ===
In 1977, Steinem expressed disapproval that the heavily publicized sex reassignment surgery of tennis player Renée Richards had been in her opinion characterized as either a frightening look at what feminism could cause or as proof that feminism was no longer necessary. Steinem wrote that the issue was at minimum "a diversion from the widespread problems of sexual inequality". She also wrote that, while she supported the right of individuals to identify as they choose, she believed some transsexuals "surgically mutilate their own bodies" in order to conform to a gender role that is inexorably tied to physical body parts. She claimed that "feminists are right to feel uncomfortable about the need for and uses of transsexualism."

On October 2, 2013, Steinem clarified her remarks on transgender people in an op-ed for The Advocate, writing that critics failed to consider that her 1977 essay was "written in the context of global protests against routine surgical assaults, called female genital mutilation by some survivors". Steinem later in the piece expressed unequivocal support for transgender people, saying that transgender people "including those who have transitioned, are living out real, authentic lives. Those lives should be celebrated, not questioned." She also apologized for any pain her words might have caused.

On June 15, 2020, Steinem co-wrote a letter with Mona Sinha to the editor of The New York Times, in which they opposed the elimination of civil rights protections for transgender healthcare by the Trump administration. In it, they made note of precolonial American traditions of gender variance and claimed that "the health of any of us affects the health of all of us, and excluding trans people endangers us all".

== Personal life and death ==
In the mid-1970s, Steinem began a nine-year relationship with Stanley Pottinger, whom she met after he asked her to consult on discrimination issues for the Civil Rights Division of the U.S. Department of Justice. In the late 1980s and early 1990s, Steinem had a four-year relationship with the publisher Mortimer Zuckerman.

On September 3, 2000, at the age of 66, Steinem married David Bale, entrepreneur and the father of actor Christian Bale. The wedding was performed at the home of her friend Wilma Mankiller, the first female Principal Chief of the Cherokee Nation. Steinem became the stepmother to Bale's four adult children; she had no biological children. Steinem and Bale were married for only three years before he died of brain lymphoma on December 30, 2003, at the age of 62.

Steinem lived on New York's Upper East Side, where she owned the first three floors of her historic brownstone apartment building. On her 87th birthday, Google Arts & Culture launched a virtual tour of her home, where she had lived since 1966.

Steinem was diagnosed with breast cancer in 1986 and trigeminal neuralgia in 1994.

Commenting on aging, Steinem said that as she approached 60 she felt as if she had entered a new phase in life free of the "demands of gender" she had faced from adolescence onward. When asked about her desired legacy, she said she hoped her work "might help individual people...to become more the unique, valuable, loved and lovable person that they want to be." In 2026, Steinem was interviewed as part of a New York Times essay asking about how it felt to reach 80. The article was released to coincide with the 80th birthday of sitting United States President Donald Trump; Steinem said the worst part of turning 80 was "losing people you love". When asked if she had advice for Trump specifically, she replied: "Resign."

When taking part in season 5 of Finding Your Roots with Henry Louis Gates, Jr., comedian Tig Notaro discovered that she and Steinem are distant cousins.

Steinem died at her home in Manhattan, New York City, on September 2, 2026, at age 92.

== Legacy ==
Following her death, The New York Times noted Steinem as the "personification of the women's movement" and a "feminist crusader who galvanized the modern women's movement". The Wall Street Journal called Steinem a longtime symbol of the women's movement and a feminist icon. The BBC News said that Steinem was the leader of the women's liberation movement in the United States. CNN said that Steinem was the "face" of the second-wave feminism movement of the 1960s and 1970s.

The Associated Press called Steinem one of the "most visible symbols and potent voices of the U.S. women's movement". The Atlantic said that she "fought for her belief that women could change the world together". NPR said Steinem "devoted her life to fighting for women's rights". Entertainment Weekly, while noting her as a feminist icon, said that she was a "pop culture shaper" and a "pop culture icon".

Former Secretary of State Hillary Clinton said that Steinem "pushed open doors not just for herself, but for literally millions of women behind her". Former First Lady Jill Biden said that Steinem fought for decades to make "freedom real for generations of women and girls".

Steinem was featured in episode three of Famous Last Words. It was filmed in February 2025 and aired the day after her death. Her last words of that interview were,

[P]lease tell your own story. This is the most important thing we can do for each other — to know each other through stories. And I hope so much that whoever you are, listening right now, you are able to do what you love — [and] to be, also, the unique person you are.

== Awards and honors ==
- American Civil Liberties Union of Southern California's Bill of Rights Award
- American Humanist Association's 2012 Humanist of the Year (2012)
- BBC's 100 Women list of the world's inspiring and influential women (2023)
- Biography magazine's 25 most influential women in America
- Clarion award
- DVF Lifetime Leadership Award (2014)
- Emmy Citation for excellence in television writing
- Esquire's 75 greatest women of all time (2010)
- Equality Now's international human rights award, given jointly to her and Efua Dorkenoo (2000)
- FAO CERES Medal
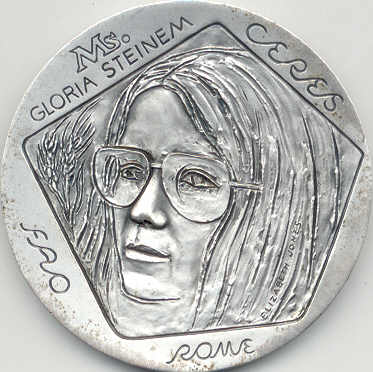
  FAO CERES Steinem Silver Obverse
- Front Page award
- Glamour magazine's "The 75 Most Important Women of the Past 75 Years" (2014)
- Lambda Legal Defense and Education Fund's Liberty Award
- Library Lion award (2015)
- The Ms. Foundation for Women's Gloria Awards, given annually since 1988, are named after Steinem
- National Gay Rights Advocates Award
- National Magazine awards
- National Women's Hall of Fame inductee (1993)
- New York Women's Foundation's Century Award (2014)
- Parenting's Lifetime Achievement Award (1995)
- Presidential Medal of Freedom (2013), for her civil-rights work
- Rutgers University announced the Gloria Steinem Endowed Chair in September 2014. The chair was created to fund teaching and research for someone (not necessarily a woman) who exemplifies Steinem's values of equal representation in the media, and to have this person teach at least one undergraduate course per semester.
- Sara Curry Humanitarian Award (2007)
- United Nations' Society of Writers Award
- University of Missouri School of Journalism Award for Distinguished Service in Journalism
- Women's Sports Journalism Award
- 2015 Richard C. Holbrooke Distinguished Achievement Award of the Dayton Literary Peace Prize
- Recipient of the 2017 Ban Ki-moon Award For Women's Empowerment
- On May 20, 2019, Steinem received an honorary degree from Yale University.
- On May 19, 2021, Steinem received the Princess of Asturias Award for Communication and Humanities.

== In media ==
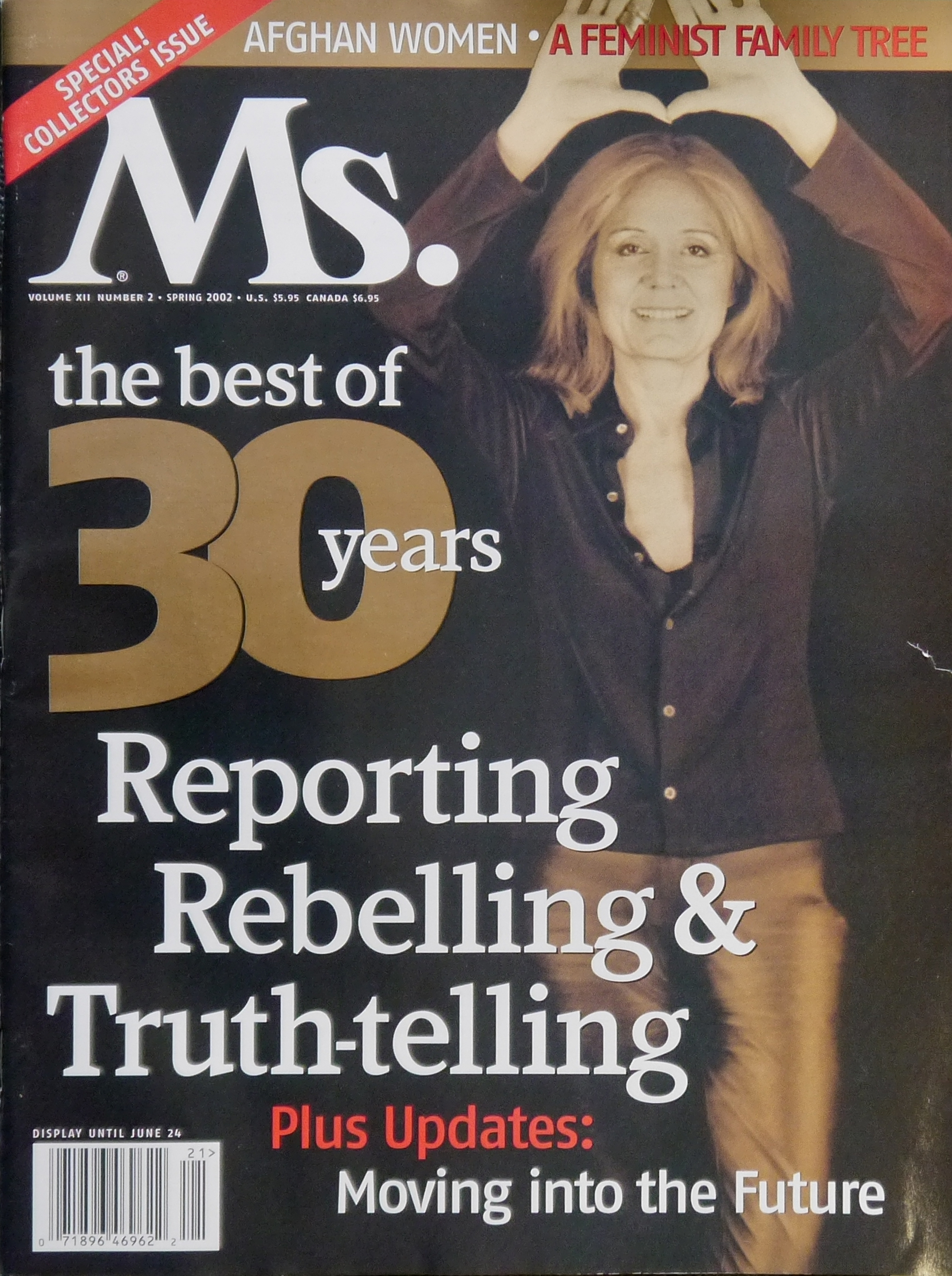
Steinem on the cover of Ms. in 2002

=== Biographies ===
- Heilbrun, Carolyn G. (1995). The Education of a Woman: The Life of Gloria Steinem. New York: Dial Press. ISBN 978-0-385-31371-1.
- Stern, Sydney Ladensohn (1997). Gloria Steinem: Her Passions, Politics, and Mystique. Secaucus, NJ: Birch Lane Press. ISBN 978-1-55972-409-8.
- Seymour, Melissa (2013). Female Force: Gloria Steinem. Illustrated by Angel Bernuy. Tidalwave Productions.
- Fabiny, Sarah (2014). Who Is Gloria Steinem?. Illustrated by Max Hergenrother. Penguin Random House. ISBN 978-0-448-48238-5.

=== Documentaries ===
- In 2011, Gloria: In Her Own Words, a documentary, first aired.
- In 2013, Steinem was featured in the documentary MAKERS: Women Who Make America about the feminist movement.

=== Portrayals by others ===
- Steinem's article, "A Bunny's Tale" was adapted as a made-for-television film of the same title in 1985, starring Kirstie Alley as Steinem.
- The play Gloria: A Life, about Steinem's life, opened in October 2018 at the Daryl Roth Theatre, directed by Diane Paulus.
- The Glorias is an American biographical film about Steinem which premiered in 2020. In the film, she is played by four actresses who portray her life at various ages: Ryan Kiera Armstrong as a child, Lulu Wilson as a teen, Alicia Vikander between the ages of 20 and 40, and Julianne Moore as an older woman.
- In 2020, Steinem was portrayed by Rose Byrne in the FX miniseries Mrs. America, depicting the movement to ratify the Equal Rights Amendment (ERA).

=== Appearances ===
- In 2005, Steinem appeared in season 2, episode 13 of The L Word.
- In 2014, Steinem appeared in the CNN series The Sixties, in the season 1 episodes 1968 and The Times They Are-a-Changin'.
- In 2014, Steinem appeared in season 6, episode 3, of the television show The Good Wife.
- In 2016, the television series Woman premiered, featuring Steinem as a producer and host; it is a documentary series concerning sexist injustice and violence worldwide.
- In 2020, she appeared in season 1 of the documentary television series Dear.
- In 2023, she guest starred on the Season 2 episode "Alive!" of the Max series And Just Like That....
- In 2025, Steinem appeared in Dear Ms.: A Revolution in Print, an HBO documentary focusing on the history of Ms.

=== Mentions ===
- In the musical Legally Blonde, which premiered in 2007, Steinem is mentioned in the scene where Elle Woods wears a flashy Bunny costume to a party, and must pretend to be dressed as Gloria Steinem "researching her feminist manifesto 'I Was A Playboy Bunny'". (The actual name of the piece by Steinem being referred to here is "A Bunny's Tale".)
- In 2016, Steinem was featured in the catalog of clothing retailer Lands' End. After an outcry from anti-abortion customers, the company removed Steinem from their website. The company then faced further criticism online, this time both from customers who were still unhappy that Steinem had been featured in the first place, and customers who were unhappy that Steinem had been removed.
- In Jennifer Lopez's 2016 music video for her song "Ain't Your Mama", Steinem can be heard saying part of her "Address to the Women of America" speech, specifically, "This is no simple reform. It really is a revolution."

== Works ==
- The Thousand Indias (1957)
- The Beach Book (1963), New York: Viking Press. OCLC 1393887.
- Outrageous Acts and Everyday Rebellions (1983), New York: Holt, Rinehart, and Winston. ISBN 978-0-03-063236-5.
- Marilyn: Norma Jean (1986), with George Barris, New York: Holt. ISBN 978-0-8050-0060-3.
- Revolution from Within: A Book of Self-Esteem (1992), Boston: Little, Brown. ISBN 978-0-316-81240-5.
- Moving Beyond Words (1993), New York: Simon & Schuster. ISBN 978-0-671-64972-2.
- "The Media and the Movement: A User's Guide" (2003) in Sisterhood Is Forever: The Women's Anthology for a New Millennium edited by Robin Morgan, New York: Washington Square Press ISBN 978-0-7434-6627-1
- Doing Sixty & Seventy (2006), San Francisco: Elders Academy Press. ISBN 978-0-9758744-2-4.
- As if Women Matter: The Essential Gloria Steinem Reader (2014), co-written with Ruchira Gupta. ISBN 978-81-291-3103-4
- My Life on the Road (2015), New York: Random House. ISBN 978-0-679-45620-9.
- The Truth Will Set You Free, But First It Will Piss You Off! (2015), illustrated by Samantha Dion Baker. New York: Random House. ISBN 978-0-593-13268-5.
- My Life on the Road (2016), New York: Random House. ISBN 978-0-345-40816-7.
- An Unexpected Life (September 22, 2026), New York: Random House. ISBN 978-0-593-97817-7. OCLC 1609717206.

The Gloria Steinem Papers are held in the Sophia Smith Collection at Smith College, under collection number MS 237.

== See also ==
- Feminism in the United States
- List of women's rights activists
