= Susanne Steinem Patch =

American gemologist (1925–2007)

Susanne Steinem Patch (February 19, 1925 – November 2, 2007) was an American gem expert and staff lawyer at the Federal Trade Commission.

== Early life ==
Susanne Steinem was born in Toledo, Ohio, the daughter of Leo Steinem and Ruth Nuneviller Steinem. Her paternal grandmother, Pauline Perlmutter Steinem, was a suffragist and activist for vocational education in Toledo. After their parents' divorce and their mother's health issues, Susanne was an important support for her younger sister, Gloria Steinem.

Susanne Steinem attended Smith College, earning an undergraduate degree in 1946. At age 50, after raising six children, she returned to school, earning her law degree from Antioch School of Law in 1978.

== Career ==
While in college, Susanne Steinem worked at a jewelry store, and became fascinated by gems. She learned the industry working as buyer in New York and Washington D.C. She taught gemology classes and hosted a local television show on the subject. During the years 1970-1975, she served as a docent at the Smithsonian Institution's Hall of Gems and Minerals and Hall of Physical Geology. Patch wrote a book, Blue Mystery: The Story of the Hope Diamond (1976), and was a technical consultant on the subject for various documentaries and exhibits.

After becoming a lawyer, Patch was a staff attorney at the Federal Trade Commission and was assigned to the Bureau of Consumer Protection from 1980 to 1994, where she oversaw regulations on jewelry, watches, and metallic watchbands. She was a member of the Maryland State Bar Association, the American Society of Jewelry Historians, the Mineralogical Society in Washington, and many other organizations.

== Personal life ==
Susanne Steinem married a patent attorney, Robert J. Patch, in 1954. The Patches had six children together, and cared for her mother Ruth Steinem, in their Chevy Chase, Maryland home. She was co-founder of her neighborhood food co-op in 1974, and remained active there through the 1980s. She was also engaged in school issues in Montgomery County, Maryland. Susanne Steinem Patch died in 2007, aged 82 years, in Bethesda, Maryland, after a stroke.
