= Pauline Perlmutter Steinem =

American suffragist

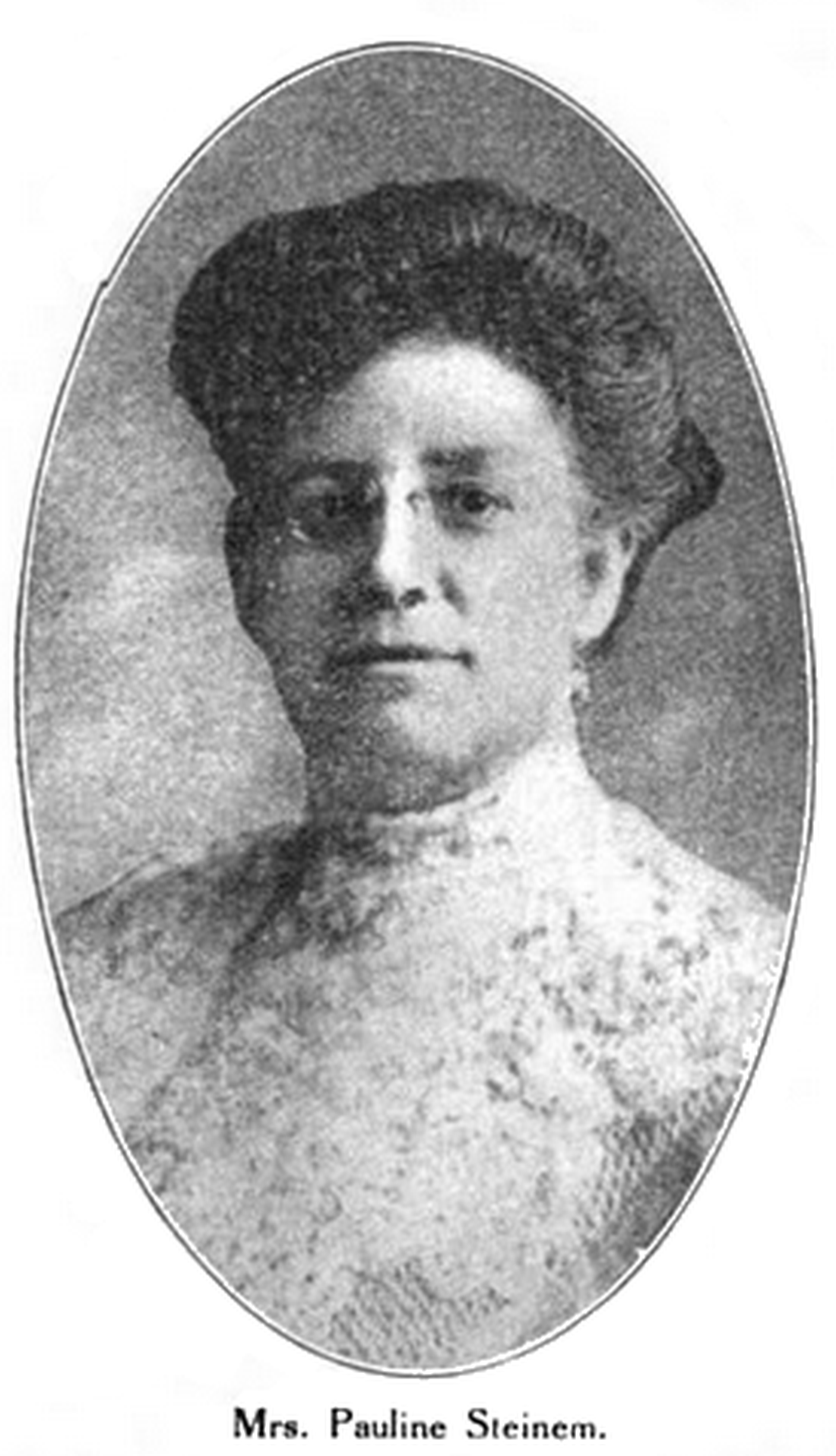
- Pauline Perlmutter Steinem, from a 1909 publication.
- Born: Pauline Perlmutter; August 4, 1864; Radziejów, Poland
- Died: January 5, 1940 (aged 75); Toledo, Ohio, U.S.
- Resting place: Woodlawn Cemetery, Toledo, Ohio, U.S.
- Occupations: Suffragist, educational reformer, activist
- Years active: 1899–1930s
- Known for: First woman elected to public office in Toledo (Toledo Board of Education, 1904); early Jewish-American suffragist leader
- Spouse(s): Joseph Steinem ( 1884 (1929))
- Children: 4 sons (including Leo Steinem)
- Parent(s): Hayman Hirsch Perlmutter (father); Bertha Slisower (mother)
- Family: Gloria Steinem (granddaughter)

Pauline Perlmutter Steinem (August 4, 1864 – January 5, 1940) was a Jewish American suffragist born in Poland. In 1904, she became the first woman to be elected to the Board of Education in Toledo, Ohio, as well as to any public office there.

Additionally, just before World War II began, she helped send as many European relatives as she could to Palestine to escape the Holocaust. She was also the grandmother of feminist Gloria Steinem.

== Early life ==
Pauline Perlmutter was born in Radziejow in Poland in 1864 (according to her tombstone; some sources give 1863 or 1866 as the year), the daughter of Reform Jewish Russian emigrants Hayman Hirsch Perlmutter, a cantor, and Bertha Slisower Perlmutter. She was raised in Bavaria, attending a teacher training program there.

== Career ==
In 1914, Pauline Perlmutter Steinem wrote:

"People say: 'Women cannot succeed in certain fields.' How do we know what women can do, when we have never yet allowed them to try? No man knows what woman would do, if she were free to develop the powers latent within her, nor does she herself know as yet."

=== In education ===
Steinem moved to the US state of Ohio as a young wife and mother. Her teacher training in Bavaria informed a lifetime of activism for education.

She was the first woman to serve on the Toledo Board of Education; when she was elected in 1904, she became the first woman to hold public office in Toledo, and possibly the first Jewish woman to hold elected public office in the United States. She was elected on a coalition ticket along with socialists and anarchists.

She founded a public vocational school, the Macomber Vocational High School, and she worked for juvenile court reform in Ohio. She was also appointed to the board of trustees for the Toledo Public Library.

=== In Jewish organizations ===
She served as the chair of the Toledo chapter of the National Council of Jewish Women, and was national chair of that organization's Sabbath School committee. She was also president of the Hebrew Associated Charities and Loan Association, a mutual aid society. Although Steinem identified as Jewish, she also followed Theosophy. Steinem identified as a universalist rather than a Zionist.

=== In women's suffrage ===
As an active member of the National American Woman Suffrage Association (NAWSA), she was a chairwoman of their educational committee and a delegate to the International Council of Women, held in Switzerland in 1908. She was head of the Ohio Woman's Suffrage Association from 1908 to 1911, and president of Toledo Council of Women, as well as president of the Toledo Federation of Women's Clubs.

== Personal life ==
In 1884, Pauline Perlmutter married Joseph Steinem, a German-born businessman who was living in Toledo, Ohio. They had four sons together, Edgar, Jesse, Clarence, and Leo; Edgar was born in Germany in 1885; the younger three sons were born in Ohio. She was widowed when Joseph died in 1929. Pauline Perlmutter Steinem died in 1940, aged 75 years, in Toledo.

Her son, Leo Steinem, was the father of American feminist Gloria Steinem, and of lawyer and gem expert Susanne Steinem Patch.
