= Prison rape in the United States =

Rape of inmates in prison by other inmates or prison staff

Prison rape is the rape of inmates in prison by other inmates or prison staff. In 2001, Human Rights Watch estimated that at least 4.3 million inmates had been raped while incarcerated in the United States. A United States Department of Justice report, Sexual Victimization in Prisons and Jails Reported by Inmates, states that "In 2011–12, an estimated 4.0% of state and federal prison inmates and 3.2% of jail inmates reported experiencing one or more incidents of sexual victimization by another inmate or facility staff in the past 12 months or since admission to the facility, if less than 12 months." However, advocates dispute the accuracy of the numbers, saying they under-report the real numbers of sexual assaults in prison, especially among juveniles.

A meta-analysis published in 2004 found a prevalence of 1.91% with a 95% confidence interval between 1.37 and 2.46%. In a survey of 1,788 male inmates in Midwestern prisons by Prison Journal, about 21% claimed they had been coerced or pressured into sexual activity during their incarceration, and 7% claimed that they had been raped in their current facility.

== Prevalence ==
Research has shown that juveniles incarcerated with adults are five times more likely to report being victims of sexual assault than youth in juvenile facilities, and the suicide rate of juveniles in adult jails is 7.7 times higher than that of juvenile detention centers.

In the United States, public awareness of the phenomenon of prison rape is a relatively recent development and estimates to its prevalence have varied widely for decades. In 1974 Carl Weiss and David James Friar wrote that 46 million Americans would one day be incarcerated; of that number, they claimed, 10 million would be raped. A 1992 estimate from the Federal Bureau of Prisons conjectured that between nine and 20 percent of inmates had been sexually assaulted. Studies in 1982 and 1996 both concluded that the rate was somewhere between 12 and 14 percent; the 1996 study, by Cindy Struckman-Johnson, concluded that 18 percent of assaults were carried out by prison staff. A 1986 study by Daniel Lockwood put the number at around 23 percent for maximum security prisons in New York. Christine Saum's 1994 survey of 101 inmates showed five had been sexually assaulted.

Reported prison rape cases have drastically risen in recent years, although this may be partially attributed to an increase in counseling and reports. The threat of HIV, which affects many of those raped in prison, has also resulted in the increase of reported cases for the benefit of medical assistance.

According to the study conducted by the United States Department of Justice for the year 2006, there were 2,205 allegations of inmate-on-inmate non-consensual sexual acts reported in the U.S. prison system, 262 of which were substantiated.

According to one source, female-perpetrated sexual abuse of inmates is a particularly large problem in juvenile detention centers, where 90% of victims of staff abuse say a female correctional officer was the perpetrator.

According to the Bureau of Justice Statistics, around 80,000 women and men a year get sexually abused in American correctional facilities. The National Inmate Survey presented data that consisted of 233 state and federal prisons, 358 local jails, and fifteen special correctional facilities between the time period of February 2011 and May 2012, with a sample of 92,449 inmates ages eighteen or older, and 1,738 inmates sixteen to seventeen. The statistical information highlighted that an estimated 4.0% of state and federal prison inmates and 3.2% of jail inmates reported experiencing one or more incidents of sexual victimization by another inmate or facility staff since their admission to the facility or in the past twelve months since the survey was executed. More specifically, around 29,300 prisoners reported an incident regarding another inmate, 34,100 prisoners reported an incident involving staff that worked at the facility, and 5,500 inmates reported an incident involving both. Rates reported by female inmates were higher than male inmates, and lower among inmates ages thirty-five or older than inmates ages twenty to twenty-four. White (2.9%) and mixed-race (4.0%) inmates were slightly more likely than black (1.6%) inmates to report sexual victimization by other inmates, while black men (2.6%) and mixed race men (3.9%) were slightly more likely than whites to report victimization by staff.

In addition, juvenile inmates ages sixteen to seventeen in adult prisons did not have significant higher rates of sexual victimization in comparison to adult inmates. An estimated 1.8% of juvenile inmates ages sixteen to seventeen reported being victimized by another inmate, in comparison to 2.0% of adult prisoners and 1.6% of adults in jails. Among juvenile inmates in the same age range, 3.2% juveniles reported experiencing staff sexual misconduct, in comparison to 2.4% of adults in prisons and 1.8% of adults in jails. Furthermore, inmates that reported their sexual orientation as gay, lesbian, bisexual, or other has the highest rates of sexual assault within the period of this survey (2011–12). Out of inmates who identify as non-heterosexual, 12.2% of prison inmates and 8.5% of jail inmates reported being sexually victimized by another inmate, compared to 1.2% and 2.1% for heterosexual inmates; 5.4% of non-heterosexual prison inmates and 4.3% of non-heterosexual jail inmates reported being sexually victimized by facility staff, while 1.2% and 1.7% are the corresponding numbers for heterosexual inmates.

During 2016 and 2017, the U.S Department of Justice and the Bureau of Justice statistics updated the data collected for the Prison Rape Elimination Act (2003) through the National Survey of Youth in Custody (NSYC). The National Survey of Youth in Custody provided an estimate of youth reporting sexual victimization in juvenile facilities through computerized self-interviewing technology. This survey was first conducted in June 2008 and the third data was collected in 2017. The collected data highlighted that sexual assault in female-only juvenile facilities (5.3%) was more than three times greater than in male-only facilities (1.5%). Youth-on-youth sexual assault was lowest (1.1%) in facilities where almost all youth reported to have first learned sexual assault was not allowed within the first twenty-four hours of arrival. For facilities with a 76% greater concentration of youth with a history of psychiatric conditions, there was a 4.0% reported incidents of sexual assault by another youth. Youth reported a 5.9% of staff sexual misconduct for facilities with multiple living units, in comparison to 2.1% of youth in facilities with single units. To conclude, rates of staff sexual misconduct were highest in facilities where youth perceived the facility staff to be unfair (10.3%), youth had the fewest positive perceptions of staff (9.7%), and youth worried about physical assault by other youth (8.2%) or staff (11.2%).

== Risk factors for victimization and perpetration ==
Concerning victimization by other inmates, many risk factors have been identified through research: race, size or stature, age, awkwardness, naivete, appearing to be intellectually challenged, not being affiliated with a gang, appearing to be homosexual, being disliked by peers and staff, reporting a prior history of sexual victimization, having a middle class background, lacking assertiveness, reporting concern regarding the possibility of victimization, getting other inmates in trouble, committing a hate crime, and committing a sexual crime against a child. There has been less research on risk factors for perpetration, but a few factors have nevertheless been identified: number of prior incarcerations, history of predation or violence, length of sentence, extent of criminal history, size or stature, duration of current sentence that has been served, race, age, and type of crime committed.

Research in this field has consistently concluded that being of European American descent was a risk factor for victimization. The few studies that have looked at how race may impact the likelihood of perpetration of sexual violence and assault found that the majority of victims said their perpetrator had been African American. Much of the early research has been described by the Bureau of Justice Statistics as too small for valid generalizations about the entire US correctional population to be made. Additionally, much of the research on the topic of sexual assault and rape in prison has relied on retrospective self-reports of victimization and self-reports of traits.

Most research on size and stature as a risk factor has lacked explicit definitions of what exact measurements would warrant a large or small characterization. Still, studies more often find that perpetrators tend to be larger than their victims, although there has been research conducted that concluded that victims tended to be overweight or small or large in stature, with perpetrators being of an "average" weight.

As far as age goes, there have been some conflicting conclusions regarding whether perpetrators tend to be older or younger than the general prison population, but it has consistently been found that victims tend to be younger than their perpetrators, with one study finding that victimized inmates were on average about 20.5 years of age, while another stated an average of 34 years old.

One study had found that a homosexual sexual orientation was a risk factor for perpetration, and a heterosexual sexual orientation before one was incarcerated was a risk factor for victimization, but much of the other research that has been done on this topic conflicts with this conclusion. One study had found that seven out of every ten inmates who identify as bisexual or homosexual reported being sexually assaulted in prison, and another study had found that homosexual inmates were 2.3 times as likely as heterosexual inmates to be the targets of sexual assault. Multiple authors have concluded that openly positive opinions of homosexual behaviors or homosexuality in general increase the risk of victimization. For more on this topic, see the section on prison rape and sexuality located below.

Staff frequently help place inmates into particular housing units to lower an inmate's risk of harm, but effectively evaluating risk during inmate intake is an ongoing issue, as conventional tools for evaluating risk have time commitment and background information requirements that are unreasonable to satisfy during intake. Additionally, one must often go through significant training to use them. Furthermore, a study from 2006 of twelve prisons found that staff at eight of them felt that, concerning appropriately managing sexual misconduct among the prisoners, they lacked training completely. Staff at overcrowded prisons may also be incentivized to avoid attaching a "high risk" label to those who may be at a high risk of victimization, as staff are required to isolate them, which may be problematic and not at all feasible when there is not enough space available to meet these requirements- This issue needs to be addressed as both correctional facility staff and imprisoned people share the belief that rates of sexual victimization would fall if more effective methods of screening and separating potential victims and abusers were developed.

In one study, staff tried to identify what factors may be contributing to prison rape and sexual assault, and for male inmates, the explanations were as follows: "male sex drives", conflict between prisoners, the desire to establish power over prisoners seen as weaker, mandated abstinence, and "the exploitative nature of inmate culture". For female prisoners, victimization was seen as resulting primarily from exploitative behavior, the sexual misconduct of those who worked at the prison, the desire for connection with others, and a past where one had been over-sexualized and abused.

== Psychological repercussion ==
According to the report conducted by the Bureau of Justice Statistics in 2011–12, inmates with serious psychological distress reported high rates of inmate-on-inmate and staff sexual assault. An estimated 6.3% of federal prison inmates with serious psychological distress reported to have been sexually victimized by another inmate, in comparison to 0.7% of inmates with no serious mental illnesses. Similar statistics were reported for non-heterosexual inmates who reported higher rates of inmate-on-inmate sexual victimization; 21% of prison inmates and 14.7% of jail inmates with serious psychological distress reported being sexually assaulted. For each measured subgroups (sex, race or Hispanic origin, body mass index, sexual orientation, and offense), inmates with serious psychological distress reported higher rates of inmate-on-inmate sexual victimization than inmates without mental health problems.

This statistical information is very important due to the very complex repercussions that sexual assault and rape can cause to an individual. According to the data provided by the Bureau of Justice and Statistics, 36.6% of prison inmates and 43.7% of jail inmates reported being told by a mental health professional that they had a mental disorder. Inmates identified with serious psychological distress reported high overall rates of sexual victimization. Serious psychological distress was identified on inmates through the use of the K6 screening test. The test consisted of six questions on how often had the inmates felt nervous, hopeless, restless, depressed, effortless, and worthless in the past 30 days. A summary score was added to three categories: 0–7 meaning no mental illness, 8–12 meaning anxiety-mood disorder, and 13 or higher meant serious psychological distress. State and federal inmates identified with serious psychological distress that were sexually victimized by another inmate were an estimated 6.3% and sexually victimized by a facility staff member were 5.6%. Likewise, 3.6% of jail inmates identified with serious psychological distress reported being sexually victimized by another inmate and 3.6% being sexually victimized by a staff member.

The Human Rights Watch published a book titled "No Escape: Male Rape in the U.S" on April 17, 2007 where they conducted extensive research for three years to expose the problem of male rape in United States prisons. The information provided in the book was collected from over 200 prisoners among thirty-four states. The Human Rights Watch included a specific description of the psychological effects that rape has on victims of sexual victimization, stating "Victims of prison rape commonly report nightmares, deep depression, shame, loss of self-esteem, self-hatred, and considering or attempting suicide. Some of them also describe a marked increase in anger and a tendency towards violence." Consequently, due to the severity of the act one of the most important repercussion is the fear that is instigated far beyond the initial trauma reaction. In Patricia Resick's article titled, "The Trauma of Rape and the Criminal Justice System", she addresses a therapy study of fear in rape victims and states, "it was not uncommon for women who were ten or twenty years postrape to seek help for continuing rape-related problems."

== Sexually transmitted infections ==
A prevalent issue that occurs because of prison rape is the transmission of sexually transmitted infections, including HIV. According to the U.S. Department of Justice, in December 2008, a total of 21,987 inmates in both federal and state prisons were HIV positive or were confirmed to have AIDS. Prisons and jails currently hold significantly high rates of HIV compared to the general population at large. There is evidence that rape and other forms of sexual violence assist in transmitting STIs. Violent forms of unprotected vaginal or anal intercourse have the highest risk of transmitting an STI. Especially for the receptive partner, outcomes of coerced sex tear the membrane of the anus or vagina and cause profuse bleeding. The unfortunate reality is that "prison rape incidents often involve multiple perpetrators" which aids in the spread of sexually transmitted infections and, "unlike sexual assault in the general community, a person who is raped in prison may be unable to remove him- or herself from the vicinity of the perpetrator or perpetrators and thus may be raped repeatedly while incarcerated". Despite the increasing number of prisoners with sexually transmitted infections, reliable statistics on prisoners who have received STIs due to prison rape are unavailable. Many reports of sexual abuse of either coerced vaginal or anal intercourse remain unreported.

It is important to note, "racial and ethnic discrimination, low socioeconomic status, migrant status, mental illness, and housing instability can also, independently or with each other, increase the risk of detention and HIV infection". Transgender people notoriously, "face high risks of HIV transmission and incarceration as a result of criminalization, discrimination in health settings, punitive law enforcement, and social marginalization". Women that are transgender, "are [specifically] subject to high levels of police abuse, including profiling as sex workers and sexual exploitation and physical and verbal abuse from guards and male inmates while in detention".

Mass overcrowding has become a serious issue within federal and state prisons, which greatly contributes to the prevalence of sexual abuse. The prison population has dramatically increased in the 2000s due to policies such as increasing sentencing laws and the War on Drugs. Prisoners thus become more vulnerable to HIV infections and other sexually transmitted infections because of the lack of space and resources available to them. With a larger prison population to watch over, there is less supervision and protection offered to prisoners and many become subject to abuse, including prison rape. Overcrowding of prisons affects not only prison populations, but acts as a serious public health issue and can adversely affect society's health as a whole. Released individuals can easily transfer an STI to others within the larger society. Therefore, it is crucial to prevent the transmission of infectious diseases within prisons.

There are rarely any resources available for the prevention of STI transmission. Some systems, like city and county jail systems, do not actively seek to identify and treat inmates with STIs. Despite being highly recommended by public health officials, preventative materials against the transmission of STIs, including condom distribution, HIV testing, and counseling and risk assessment, are rarely accessible to prisoners.

== Prison rape and sexuality ==
In prison rape, the perpetrator and victim are almost always the same sex (due to the gender-segregated nature of prison confinement). As such, a host of issues regarding sexual orientation and gender roles are associated with the topic.

Along with the bribe for protection, both male and female inmates sell sex for money, or additional reasons such as bribery or blackmail. According to the 2006 Bureau of Justice Statistics (BJS) study, in 30 percent of the inmate-on-inmate incidents, victims were talked into the sexual encounter. This finding shows that there is more behind the prison rape than simply one's sexuality. Male sexual victimization was more frequently perpetrated by the staff, whereas the perpetrator for female inmates was more frequently another inmate. This discrepancy in sexual assault between genders could be linked to lack of reporting by the inmates. A recent study found that "only approximately one quarter of the male inmates and one tenth of the female inmates reported their perceived victimization to a correctional officer or a prison official." The reports of victimization among women and men involved abusive sexual contact and some form of forced sex.

In U.S. women prisons, there is the common notion that sexual encounters usually occur more in hopes of "love, affection, and companionship." This is somewhat true, but there is also a hypersexualization and stereotype associated with incarcerated women. Some of the society sees incarcerated women as socially deviant and overly sexual, which can translate over to the notion that the women in the prisons always have voluntary relationships. A study in 1966 noted that 21 percent of the females inmates had a voluntary homosexual relationship. However, the most recent research on women inmates indicates a change. The latest study found that only "five of the 35 women" interviewed were in a voluntary homosexual relationship, with most of the women now describing themselves as "loners." This change indicates that homosexual relationships among incarcerated women do not occur as frequently as in prior generations.

LGBT inmates are more likely to be raped while incarcerated. Although the sexual assault reporting system is notoriously flawed because of inmate fear or pride, elaboration on this statement is found in a recent publication. All of the inmate surveys conducted by the Bureau of Justice Statistics confirms that LGBT inmates "report higher rates of sexual victimization than their straight counterparts." In the 2011 to 2012 Survey, the Bureau found that within the past twelve months 12.2% of non-heterosexual people in prison reported inmate-on-inmate sexual assaults and heterosexual inmates reported 1.2%. In regards to staff-on-inmate sexual assault, 5.4% of nonheterosexual inmates reported victimization, compared to 2.1% of heterosexual inmates who reported victimization. A study conducted in a California prison discovered that 67 percent of LGBTQ inmates reported sexual assault during their incarceration. Many speculate that these numbers are due to their place in the sexual hierarchy in prison, which automatically makes them targets of sexual assault.

Some prisons separate known homosexuals, bisexuals, and transgender people from the general prison population to prevent rape and violence against them. There are, however, other methods to get oneself segregated from population, such as rule infractions or feigned suicide attempts. Other inmates have resorted to killing their rapist (or probable future rapist), particularly those who already have long sentences and are thus immune from further legal consequences.

Shame regarding perceived homosexuality may contribute to the under-reporting of prison rape by victims. Prison rape statistics are much higher than reported, as many victims are afraid to report, being threatened with physical violence by rapists if reported, as well as staff indifference.

Public Law 108-79 was passed in the United States in 2003. According to Stop Prisoner Rape:

The bill calls for the gathering of national statistics about the problem; the development of guidelines for states about how to address prisoner rape; the creation of a review panel to hold annual hearings; and the provision of grants to states to combat the problem. "Unfortunately, in many facilities throughout the country sexual abuse continues virtually unchecked," said Stemple. "Too often, corrections officers turn a blind eye, or in the case of women inmates, actually perpetrate the abuse. We hope federal legislation will not only create incentives for states to take this problem seriously, but also give facilities the tools and information they need to prevent it."

According to the research of AP, a culture of predatory personnel at the Dublin prison in California was driven by cover-ups that maintained their actions mostly hidden from the public eye for years. The former warden of the facility was found guilty of assaulting prisoners and making them pose naked in their cells. He was one of numerous personnel accused of abusing prisoners sexually. Also found guilty was its chaplain.

== Reporting prison rape ==
"Sexual assault is [already] an underreported crime," and prison rape only increases the likelihood for individuals to not "report their assaults to law enforcement personnel." A "Crime Victimization Survey [concluded] that only 20–35% of female sexual assault victims" openly discuss and report their assault to police enforcement. Sexual assault victims deal with severe shame and fear, which plays a significant role in their decision to report the crime. Women and minorities have especially difficult circumstances when it comes to dealing with reporting sexual assault to law enforcement. "Certain communities and settings" make it more difficult to report assault; for instance college campuses are notorious for not handling rape claims appropriately.

The Prison Rape Elimination Act (PREA) was passed in 2003, but unfortunately the guidelines and standards that made up the act were not executed nationally until 2014. A study conducted by five reputable scholars analyzed "what factors" are important to the decision making process of women behind reporting sexual assault in prison "in an effort to inform or enhance the implementation of PREA." The study was made up of 179 incarcerated women who experienced "almost 400 incidents of staff sexual misconduct." The study was focused on women because there is a higher volume of women sexually assaulted in prisons, making the majority of the reporting cases studied female.

The study addressed the individual-level factors that contribute to the reporting of sexual assault in prisons. Victim gender plays a role in reporting, in "that female victims of sexual assault are more likely to report their assaults than male victims." In regards to victim race, it appeared that there was no difference in reported cases based on race in incarcerated women. Another important factor in reported cases of sexual assault can be victim age. Younger victims are more likely to report than older victims, most likely because younger victims want to take action while the older victims are more concerned with the "potential consequences with reporting." Victim's income and victim education are surprising factors in that "women of higher socioeconomic status are less likely to report sexual assault," and women with higher education tend to report less frequently than those with less formal schooling.

In addition to these individual-level factors, the study revealed that the type of assault had adverse effects of the likelihood of reporting. "Assaults which resulted in a physical injury were 3.7 times more likely to be reported" and the "assaults that occurred on more than one occasion were only half as likely to be reported." Assaults that resulted in compensation in one form or another were much less likely to be reported. All of these factors that determine an inmate's likelihood of reporting play a major role in how prison rape should be handled. Individuals need to feel comfortable with speaking out and need to be aware of their options in regards to reporting, as well as a reassessment of correctional staff.

In another study, Brett Garland and Gabrielle Wilson studied whether reporting sexual assault is viewed the same as snitching in prison settings. The data gathered from their scholarly journal was collected from the "EthnoMethodological Study of the Subculture of Prison Inmate Sexuality in the United States, 2004–2005, retrieved from the Inter-university Consortium for Political and Social Research", which analyzed 409 male inmates and 155 female inmates from "30 high-security prisons". These prisons were spread throughout 10 different states within "four regions of the United States". The results of Garland and Wilson's analysis of the data were "sixty-five percent of the inmates studied" agreed that reporting sexual assault is the same as snitching. It was also found that "the odds of an inmate considering that reporting rape is synonymous with snitching increases 33% for every" increase in the months that have been served on an individual's sentencing time. But, as time goes on, an inmate's likelihood of registering reporting with snitching will eventually hit a plateau, and their sentencing time will no longer determine their view on reporting. Race and ethnicity were evaluated and the data showed that "black inmates are less likely to consider reporting rape as snitching." Several other variables were analyzed, such as "age first imprisoned, prior prison commitments, age, marital status, sexual orientation, or violent offense," but proved to be not significant with the goal of the research.

This study shines a light on the reality of inmates' views on rape. Garland and Wilson conclude that there is "a need to address inmate socialization immediately upon inmate arrival, as the likelihood of accepting the reporting of rape as snitching increases the most during the earlier months of incarceration." The study reassures that an inmate's decision on whether or not to report sexual assault depends again on a multitude of factors.

A journal written by four scholarly researchers, the subject of rape myth acceptance (RMA) was analyzed to see how it affects the reporting of sexual assault with women. Throughout the beginning of their study, the authors introduced the idea of the "'classic rape'" which is seen as an "abduction, the perpetrator being a stranger, severe force, and serious injury." Incarcerated women are likely to compare their own sexual assault to their own concept of what constitutes as "rape." This correlation is believed to "negatively impact women's decisions to report to the police." Rape myth is defined as "specific beliefs about rape that are widespread and persistently held, despite the fact that they are largely false."

The overall goal of the study was to determine "whether RMA is a true barrier for incarcerated women" in terms of reporting behaviors. The results of the study showed that women who accepted rape myths were "98.1 times less likely" to report their sexual assault to the police. It is highlighted that "rape victims' mental health" is directly affected by whether or not they decided to report their sexual assault. It is disclosed that individuals that report their assault early on "can result in higher self-esteem and fewer post traumatic stress disorder (PTSD) symptoms." Since RMA is negatively correlated with a victim's reporting behavior, it can be said, "RMA is a barrier to psychological recovery and healing."

== Politics ==
The US has been proven to imprison "a larger percentage of its population than any other country in the world except the Seychelles, whose population is 0.03% of the United States'." Inmates in America are "at least three times more likely to have HIV/AIDS than the general US population". The authors of a study published in 2014 in Health Affairs "surveyed the medical directors of the 50 state prison systems and 40 of the largest jails in the country" and "found that only 19% of the prison systems and 35% of the jails provided opt-out HIV testing". Those are tests in which all "inmates are tested unless they specifically decline". Timothy Flanigan, a Brown University infectious disease specialist, pointed out that "other countries have a much more proactive approach" than the US. He added that, "unfortunately, our jail and prison systems are governed largely by cities and states"; they're not federal. The privatization of correctional facilities can be harmful to public health, yet the incentive to screen and treat inmates at a cost is low. Condoms are "an inexpensive way to minimize the risk of HIV transmission in jails and prisons, but few state prison systems and only some of the largest jails provide them".

There are many issues caused by rape in prison, including the fact that it "undermines the authority structure in prison settings". Some victims "find that sexual predators control their lives more so than... the institutional authority". The high prevalence of rape in correctional facilities "produces a perception in the general public that prisons are chaotic, not secure; jails and prisons should be places where crimes are paid for, not committed". Additionally, "a rampant prison rape culture increases levels of violence in and out of prisons". Prison rape has "long been recognized as a contributing factor in fights, homicides, insurrections, and other forms of institutional violence". Prison rape also creates a public health problem. Following traumatic events, "victims require physical and mental health treatment both while in prison and after they have been released". It also "furthers the spread of communicable diseases, such as HIV, AIDS, tuberculosis, and hepatitis B and C, both in and out of prison". The "physical and psychological problems resulting from prison rape also make it difficult for former inmates to keep steady jobs or to assimilate back into the normal routines of life".

One expert voiced that "a high prevalence of prison rape results in higher recidivism, more homelessness, or at best individuals requiring some form of government assistance." American society "fails to see prison rape for the tragedy that it is, a tragedy affecting not only prisons and prisoners, but also society at large". Michael Horowitz, senior fellow at the Hudson Institute, is credited by many "as being the creative force behind the prison rape legislation": PREA. He "was influential in initiating the idea, developing the legislative language, and coordinating a groundswell of support for the bill from a diverse coalition of public interest, religious, and policy groups". The "diverse coalition included Amnesty International, Concerned Women of America, Focus on the Family, Human Rights Watch, Justice Policy Institute, NAACP, National Association of Evangelicals, Open Society Policy Center, National Council of La Raza, Prison Fellowship, Stop Prisoner Rape, and many other organizations". The legislation was created in an attempt "to change the attitudes and perceptions of government officials and people in the corrections field toward prison rape by making the prevention, investigation, and prosecution of prison rape a top priority throughout the nation's correctional facilities", while providing the foundation "for the gathering of solid data on the extent of the prison rape problem" and helping "corrections officials to make informed decisions as they attempt to eliminate it".

Many human rights groups, such as Human Rights Watch and Stop Prisoner Rape, have cited documented incidents showing that prison staff tolerate rape as a means of controlling the prison population in general.

The topic of prison rape is common in American humor. Jokes such as "don't drop the soap" seem to suggest that prison rape is an expected consequence of being sent to prison. This phenomenon is exemplified by the 2006 U.S. feature film Let's Go to Prison or the board game Don't Drop the Soap marketed by John Sebelius, the son of Kathleen Sebelius. Songs have also been composed about the topic, e.g. the song "Prisoner of Love" by radio personalities Bob and Tom, performing as "Slam and Dave". The prevalence of this controversial humor is so widespread that it even appears in children's media such as SpongeBob and Shrek.

U.S. Federal law, under the Prison Rape Elimination Act of 2003, calls for the compilation of national prison rape statistics, annual hearings by a review panel, and the provision of grants to the states to address prison rape. A first, highly-controversial and disputed study, funded under the PREA by Mark Fleisher, concludes prison rape is rare: "Prison rape worldview doesn't interpret sexual pressure as coercion," he wrote. "Rather, sexual pressure ushers, guides or shepherds the process of sexual awakening."

In 2007, the US Supreme Court refused to hear the case of Khalid el-Masri, who had accused the CIA of torture, including "forced anal penetration", due to state secrets privilege.

In 2012, the US Justice department issued nationally enforceable protocols to all correctional institutions to expand upon the provisions of the 2003 PREA ACT. The move is an effort to prevent, detect and respond to prison rape more effectively. The measure includes numerous provisions, such as barring juveniles from being housed with adult inmates, a ban on cross-gender pat-down searches, video monitoring and special attention to lesbian, gay, transgender or bisexual inmates vulnerable to abuse. Attorney General Eric Holder noted that "these standards are the result of a thoughtful and deliberative process – and represent a critical step forward in protecting the rights and safety of all Americans."

== Prison Rape Elimination Act of 2003 ==
The Prison Rape Elimination Act of 2003 (PREA) was a federal law that was administered to ensure protection for the inmates in the epidemic of prison rape. Many actors were included in this process of making up the act. The goal of the act was to "provide for the analysis of the incidence and effects of prison rape in Federal, State, and local institutions and to provide information, resources, recommendation and funding to protect individuals from prison rape." Some of the highlights from the prison elimination act was "requires development of standards for detection, prevention, reduction, and punishment of prison rape. Awards grants to help State and local governments implement the Act's provision. The act applies to all public and private institutions that house adult or juvenile offenders and to community-based correctional agencies." Although all these rules were put in place to combat prison rape, it ultimately did not decrease sexual assault in prison. The act did not take into consideration the overcrowding in prisons or if instruction was enforced on correctional officers to enforce these rules. Another problem that appeared is that act was a national act, which allowed states to make the decision, to follow or not to follow the act. The delegation of funds to treat inmates was tricky due to having a lack of funds to achieve the goals they planned or promised.

== See also ==
- National Prison Rape Elimination Commission
- Sexual abuse of women in American prisons
- HIV/AIDS in American prisons
- Prison sexuality
- Prisoner rights in the United States
- Stephen Donaldson
- Suicide of Rodney Hulin
- T. J. Parsell
- V-coding
