= Domestic policy of the George W. Bush administration =

Domestic Policy of the United States (2001 - 2009)

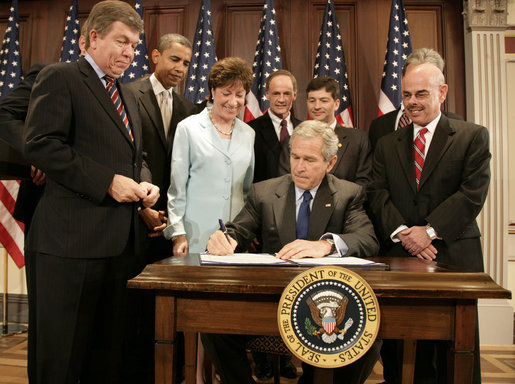
President George W. Bush signs into law S.2590, the Federal Funding Accountability and Transparency Act of 2006 in the Dwight D. Eisenhower Executive Office Building. Looking on are Sen. Susan Collins (R-ME), Chairwoman of the Senate Homeland Security Committee, and from left: Rep. Roy Blunt (R-MO), Sen. Barack Obama (D-IL), Sen. Tom Carper (D-DE), Rep. Jeb Hensarling (R-TX), and Rep. Henry Waxman (D-CA).

The domestic policy of the George W. Bush administration was the domestic policy of the United States from 2001 to 2009 while George W. Bush was president. Bush's main domestic policy advisors include Chairman of the Council of Economic Affairs Edward Lazear, Rob Portman, director of the Office of Management and Budget; U.S. Secretary of Labor Elaine Chao, Vice President Dick Cheney; U.S. Secretary of the Treasury Henry Paulson; U.S. Secretary of Commerce Carlos Gutierrez; U.S. Secretary of Health and Human Services Michael O. Leavitt and Allan Hubbard, director of the National Economic Council.

Some of George W. Bush's biggest domestic policy achievements include winning passage for two major tax cuts during his term in office: the Economic Growth and Tax Relief Reconciliation Act of 2001 and the Jobs and Growth Tax Relief Reconciliation Act of 2003. Collectively, they became known, analyzed, and debated as the "Bush tax cuts".

== Law enforcement and justice ==
=== Surveillance and homeland security ===
On October 26, 2001, Bush signed into law the Patriot Act. Passed on the president's request, the act permitted increased sharing of intelligence among the U.S. Intelligence Community and expanded the government's domestic authority to conduct surveillance of suspected terrorists. The Patriot Act also authorized the use of roving wiretaps on suspected terrorists and expanded the government's authority to conduct surveillance of suspected "lone wolf" terrorists. Bush also secretly authorized the National Security Agency to conduct warrantless surveillance of communications in and out of the United States.

Shortly after the September 11 attacks, Bush announced the creation of the Office of Homeland Security and appointed former governor of Pennsylvania Tom Ridge its director. After Congress passed the Homeland Security Act signed into law by President Bush on November 25, 2002, to create the Department of Homeland Security (DHS), Ridge became the first director of the newly created department. The department was charged with overseeing immigration, border control, customs, and the newly established Transportation Security Administration (TSA), which focused on airport security. Though the FBI and CIA remained independent agencies, the DHS was assigned jurisdiction over the Coast Guard, the Immigration and Naturalization Service (which was divided into three agencies), the United States Customs Service (which was also divided into separate agencies), and the Federal Emergency Management Agency. The Homeland Security Act represented the most significant departmental reorganization since the National Security Act of 1947.

=== Capital punishment ===
George W. Bush is a strong supporter of capital punishment. During his tenure as Governor of Texas, 152 people were executed in that state, maintaining its record as the leading state in executions. As President of the United States, he has continued in his support for capital punishment, including presiding over the first federal execution in decades, that of convicted terrorist Timothy McVeigh. Although Bush's support of the death penalty is known, controversy broke in 1999 when journalist Tucker Carlson revealed that the Governor had mocked the plight of Karla Faye Tucker in an interview.

=== Amber alert ===
Bush signed the Amber alert legislation into law on April 30, 2003, which was developed to quickly alert the general public about child abductions using various media sources. On July 27, 2006, Bush signed the Adam Walsh Child Protection and Safety Act which establishes a national database requiring all convicted sex offenders to register their current residency and related details on a monthly instead of the previous yearly basis. Newly convicted sex offenders will also face longer mandatory incarceration periods.

=== Prison rape ===
The Prison Rape Elimination Act of 2003 (PREA) is the first United States federal law passed dealing with the sexual assault of prisoners. The bill was signed into law by President Bush on September 4, 2003. As a result, the National Prison Rape Elimination Commission was created to study the problem and recommend solutions. Federal funding for prisons also began to require detainment facilities to keep records on sexual assault. Failure to follow PREA requirements resulted in losing up to 5% of funding. New grants to prevent sexual assault were also created by the law. Significant support for the act came from Human Rights Watch, Concerned Women for America, Just Detention International, and numerous evangelical organizations.

== Science ==
On December 19, 2002, Bush signed into law H. R. 4664, far-reaching legislation to put the National Science Foundation (NSF) on a track to double its budget over five years and to create new mathematics and science education initiatives at both the pre-college and undergraduate level. In the first three years of those five, the R&D budget increased by fourteen percent. Bush had long been dogged by criticism that his administration ignored or suppressed scientific advice. Bush showed support for oceanography and space exploration; and supported sciences on reducing pollution. Bush generally was opposed to biology, especially the science of human reproduction and reproductive health. Bush supported "Teach the Controversy". Bush's positions were not always shared by his party.

=== Stem cell research ===
President Bush supported adult stem cell research and umbilical cord blood stem cell research. However, Bush opposed any new embryonic stem cell research, and had limited the federal funding of existing research. Federal funding for embryonic stem cell research was first approved under President Clinton on January 19, 1999, but no money was to be spent until the guidelines were published. The guidelines were released under Clinton on August 23, 2000. They allowed use of unused frozen embryos. On August 9, 2001, before any funding was granted under these guidelines, Bush announced modifications to the guidelines to allow use of only existing stem cell lines. While Bush claimed that more than 60 embryonic stem cell lines already existed from privately funded research, scientists in 2003 said there were only 11 usable lines, and in 2005 that all lines approved for Federal funding are contaminated and unusable. Adult stem cell funding was not restricted and was supported by President Bush as a more viable means of research.

On July 19, 2006, Bush vetoed a bill on stem cell research.

On June 20, 2007, Bush vetoed a stem cell bill again.

=== Space exploration ===
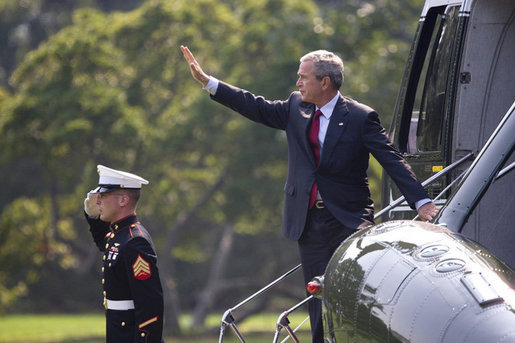
President George W. Bush waves as he prepares to depart the White House aboard Marine One from the South Lawn en route to Andrews Air Force Base for his trip to Michigan.

On January 14, 2004, Bush announced a Vision for Space Exploration, calling for the completion of the International Space Station by 2010 and the retirement of the Space Shuttle while developing a new spacecraft called the Crew Exploration Vehicle under the title Project Constellation. The CEV would be used to return American astronauts to the Moon by 2018, with the objective of establishing a permanent lunar base, and eventually sending future crewed missions to Mars. To this end, the plan proposes that NASA's budget increase by five percent every year until it is capped at US$18 billion in 2008, with only inflationary increases thereafter. The planned retirement of the Space Shuttle fleet in 2010 after the ISS is completed is also expected to free up US$5 billion to US$6 billion a year. The US$16.2 billion budget for 2005 proposed by NASA met with resistance from House and Senate spending committees, and the initiative was little-mentioned during the presidential campaign. Nonetheless, the budget was approved with only minor changes shortly after the November elections.

Supporters believe that this plan will be an important part of what Bush set in place while in office. However, the policy has been criticized on two fronts. Firstly, critics have opined that the United States should deal with solving domestic issues before concentrating on space exploration. Secondly, of the funding over the next five years that Bush has proposed, only US$1 billion will be in new appropriations while the remaining US$11 billion will be reallocated from NASA's other programs, and therefore inadequate to fully realize this vision. Most of the spending for the new program, and most of the budget cuts for existing programs, are scheduled after the last year of the Bush presidency. It is unclear how the space vision will be reconciled with budgetary concerns in the longer term.

In January 2005, the White House released a new Space Transportation Policy fact sheet which outlined the administration's space policy in broad terms and tied the development of space transport capabilities to national security requirements.

=== Environment ===
In December 2003, Bush signed legislation implementing key provisions of his Healthy Forests Initiative. Another subject of controversy is Bush's Clear Skies Initiative, which seeks to reduce air pollution through expansion of emissions trading.

Bush signed the Great Lakes Legacy Act of 2002 authorizing the federal government to begin cleaning up pollution and contaminated sediment in the Great Lakes, as well as the Brownfields Legislation in 2002, accelerating the cleanup of abandoned industrial sites, or brownfields, to better protect public health, create jobs, and revitalize communities.

The EPA under Bush altered the standard for wetlands to be protected in 2007.

Bush stated his reason for not supporting the Kyoto Protocol was that it unfairly targeted the United States while being deliberately lenient with certain developing countries, especially China and India. Bush stated, "The world's second-largest emitter of greenhouse gases is China. Yet, China was entirely exempted from the requirements of the Kyoto Protocol."

Bush also questioned the science behind the global warming phenomenon, insisting that more research be done to determine its validity.

==== Hurricane Katrina ====
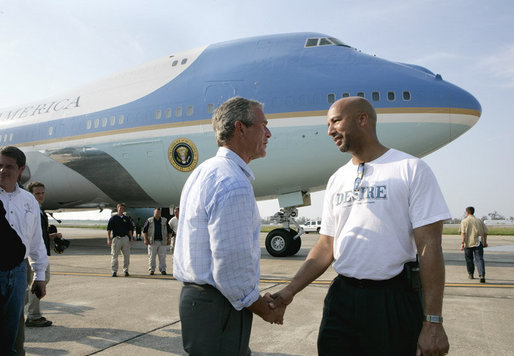
President Bush shaking hands with New Orleans Mayor Ray Nagin after viewing the devastation of Hurricane Katrina, September 2, 2005

Hurricane Katrina struck early in Bush's second term and was one of the most damaging natural disasters in U.S. history. Katrina formed in late August during the 2005 Atlantic hurricane season and devastated much of the north-central Gulf Coast of the United States, particularly New Orleans.

Bush declared a state of emergency in Louisiana on August 27 and in Mississippi and Alabama the following day. He authorized the Department of Homeland Security (DHS) and Federal Emergency Management Agency (FEMA) to manage the disaster, but his announcement failed to spur these agencies to action. The eye of the hurricane made landfall on August 29, and New Orleans began to flood due to levee breaches; later that day, Bush declared a major disaster in Louisiana, officially authorizing FEMA to start using federal funds to assist in the recovery effort.

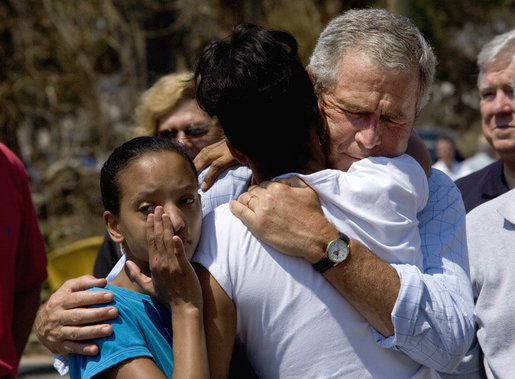
President Bush with hurricane victims in Biloxi, September 2, 2005

On August 30, DHS Secretary Michael Chertoff declared it "an incident of national significance", triggering the first use of the newly created National Response Plan. Three days later, on September 2, National Guard troops first entered the city of New Orleans. The same day, Bush toured parts of Louisiana, Mississippi, and Alabama and declared that the success of the recovery effort up to that point was "not enough".

As the disaster in New Orleans intensified, critics charged that Bush was misrepresenting his administration's role in what they saw as a flawed response. Leaders attacked Bush for having appointed apparently incompetent leaders to positions of power at FEMA, notably Michael D. Brown; it was also argued that the federal response was limited as a result of the Iraq War and Bush himself did not act upon warnings of floods. Bush responded to mounting criticism by accepting full responsibility for the federal government's failures in its handling of the emergency. It has been argued that with Katrina, Bush passed a political tipping point from which he would not recover.

==== Global warming ====
Upon arriving in office in 2001, President Bush withdrew United States support of the then-pending Kyoto Protocol, a UN Convention seeking to impose mandatory targets for reducing "greenhouse gas" emissions. Bush stated that human activity had not been proven to be the cause and cited concerns about the treaty's impact on the U.S. economy and pointed out that China and India had not signed on. The Protocol entered into force on 16 February 2005. As of September 2011, 191 states have signed and ratified the protocol. The only remaining signatory not to have ratified the protocol is the United States.

In 2002, the Bush Administration's EPA issued a Climate Action Report concluding that the climate changes observed over several decades "are likely mostly due to human activities, but we cannot rule out that some significant part of these changes is also a reflection of natural variability". While the EPA report was initially hailed by some environmentalists critical of the Bush administration as a "180-degree turn on the science" reversing "everything the president has said about global warming since he took office," within days President Bush dismissed the report as being "put out by the bureaucracy," and reaffirmed his opposition to the Kyoto Protocol.

The Bush Administration's stance on global warming, and in particular its questioning the consensus of scientists, would remain controversial in the scientific and environmental communities during his presidency. In 2004, the Director of NASA's Goddard Institute, James E. Hansen, came out publicly and harshly accusing the administration of misinforming the public by suppressing the scientific evidence of the dangers of greenhouse gases, saying the Bush administration wanted to hear only scientific results that "fit predetermined, inflexible positions" and edited reports to make the dangers sound less threatening in what he asserted was "direct opposition to the most fundamental precepts of science." Other experts, such as former U.S. Department of Energy official Joseph Romm, have decried the Bush administration as a "denier and delayer" of government action essential to reduce carbon emissions and deter global warming.

In 2005, Council on Environmental Quality chairman and former oil industry lobbyist Philip Cooney, was accused of doctoring and watering down descriptions of climate research from other government agencies. The White House denied these reports. Two days later, Cooney announced his resignation and conceded his role in altering the reports. "My sole loyalty was to the President and advancing the policies of his administration," he told the United States House Committee on Oversight and Government Reform.

In addition, the administration thanked Exxon executives for the company's "active involvement" in helping to determine climate change policy, including the US stance on Kyoto.

President Bush believes that global warming is real and has said that he has consistently noted that global warming is a serious problem but asserted there is a "debate over whether it's manmade or naturally caused" and maintained that regardless of that debate his administration was working on plans to make America less dependent on foreign oil "for economic and national security reasons."

The United States has signed the Asia Pacific Partnership on Clean Development and Climate, a pact that allows signatory countries to set goals for reducing greenhouse gas emissions individually, but with no enforcement mechanism. Republican Governor Arnold Schwarzenegger, along with 187 mayors from US towns and cities, have pledged to adopt Kyoto style legal limits on greenhouse gas emissions.

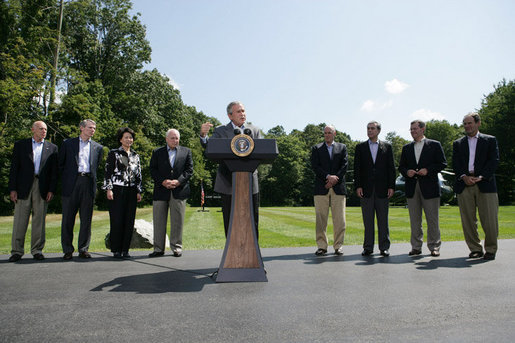
President George W. Bush gestures as he addresses his remarks to the media in Camp David, following a meeting with his economic advisors, from left to right, Edward P. Lazear, chairman of the Council of Economic Advisors; Rob Portman, director of the Office of Management and Budget; U.S. Secretary of Labor Elaine Chao; Vice President Dick Cheney; U.S. Secretary of the Treasury Henry Paulson; U.S. Secretary of Commerce Carlos Gutierrez; U.S. Secretary of Health and Human Services Michael O. Leavitt and Allan Hubbard, director of the National Economic Council.

==== Drilling in the Arctic National Wildlife Refuge ====
For economic and national security reasons, Bush supported Alaska Senator Ted Stevens' plan to tap the oil reserves in a 2,000-acre (8 km^{2}) area of Alaska's 19 million acre (77,000 km^{2}) Arctic National Wildlife Refuge. Pro-exploration supporters argue that U.S. companies have the most stringent environmental requirements, and that by doing the drilling in the middle of the winter, it would create a very small environmental footprint.

Opponents stated that drilling would damage the coastal plain's fragile ecosystem and its wildlife. Proponents stated that modern techniques can extract the oil without damaging the environment

==== The Clear Skies Act of 2003 ====
Initially announced by President Bush in 2002, the Clear Skies Initiative was aimed at amending the Clean Air Act to further reduce air pollution and expanded the emissions trading programs to include new pollutants such as mercury. The goal of the initiative was to reduce the sulfur dioxide, nitrogen oxide, and mercury emissions of power plants over the course of 15 years, while saving consumers millions of dollars.

Among other things, the Clear Skies Act states that it would:

- Cut mercury emissions by 69 percent, – the first-ever national cap on mercury emissions. Emissions will be cut from current emissions of 48 tons to a cap of 26 tons in 2010, and 15 tons in 2018.
- Cut emissions of nitrogen oxide (NO_{x}) by 67 percent, from emissions of 5 million tons to a cap of 2.1 million tons in 2008, and to 1.7 million tons in 2018
- Cut sulfur dioxide (SO_{2}) emissions by 73 percent, from emissions of 11 million tons to a cap of 4.5 million tons in 2010, and 3 million tons in 2018.
- Emission caps will be set to account for different air quality needs in the East and the West.
- Section 483 of the Bill exempt some older building from many of the provisions of the Bill, but must still meet carbon monoxide standards.

The Natural Resources Defense Council, and its more than 500,000 members, examined the administration proposal and concluded it would harm public health, weaken current pollution fighting programs and worsen global warming. S. 385, the administration's bill to amend the Clean Air Act would: 1. Allow power plant pollution to continue to inflict huge, avoidable health damages on the public. 2. Repeal or interfere with major health and air quality safeguards in current law. 3. Worsen global warming by ignoring CO_{2} emissions from the power sector.

==== Energy ====
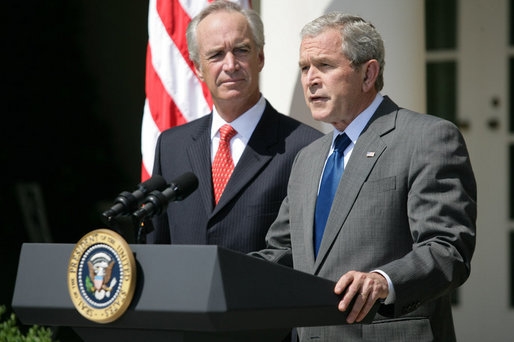
President Bush delivering a statement on energy, urging Congress to end offshore oil drill ban, June 18, 2008

In 2005–2006, Bush emphasized the need for comprehensive energy reform and proposed increased funding for research and development of alternative sources of energy such as hydrogen power, nuclear power, ethanol, and clean coal technologies. Bush proposed the American Competitiveness Initiative which seeks to support increasing competitiveness of the U.S. economy, with greater development of advanced technologies, as well as greater education and support for American students.

In his 2006 State of the Union Address, Bush declared, "America is addicted to oil" and announced his Advanced Energy Initiative to increase energy development research.

In his 2007 State of the Union Address, Bush renewed his pledge to work toward diminished reliance on foreign oil by reducing fossil fuel consumption and increasing alternative fuel production. Amid high gasoline prices in 2008, Bush lifted a ban on offshore drilling. However, the move was largely symbolic because there was still a federal law banning offshore drilling. Bush said, "This means that the only thing standing between the American people and these vast oil reserves is action from the U.S. Congress." Bush had said in June 2008, "In the long run, the solution is to reduce demand for oil by promoting alternative energy technologies. My administration has worked with Congress to invest in gas-saving technologies like advanced batteries and hydrogen fuel cells ... In the short run, the American economy will continue to rely largely on oil. And that means we need to increase supply, especially here at home. So my administration has repeatedly called on Congress to expand domestic oil production."

In his 2008 State of the Union Address, Bush announced that the U.S. would commit $2 billion over the next three years to a new international fund to promote clean energy technologies and fight climate change, saying, "Along with contributions from other countries, this fund will increase and accelerate the deployment of all forms of cleaner, more efficient technologies in developing nations like India and China, and help leverage substantial private-sector capital by making clean energy projects more financially attractive." He also announced plans to reaffirm the United States' commitment to work with major economies, and, through the UN, to complete an international agreement that will slow, stop, and eventually reverse the growth of greenhouse gases; he stated, "This agreement will be effective only if it includes commitments by every major economy and gives none a free ride."

==== National preserves ====
On June 15, 2006, Bush created the seventy-fifth, and largest, National Monument in U.S. history and the largest Marine Protected Area in the world with the formation of the Northwestern Hawaiian Islands National Monument.

== Economy ==
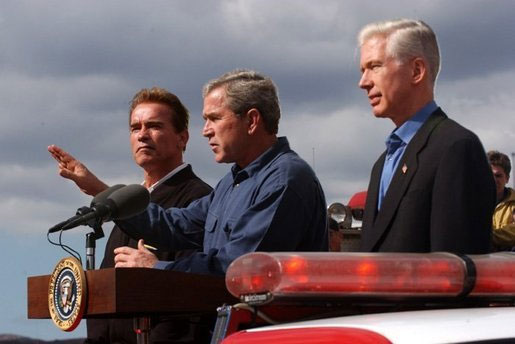
George W. Bush speaks to firefighters on November 4, 2003, as California Governor-Elect Arnold Schwarzenegger and Governor Gray Davis listen.

According to the National Bureau of Economic Research, the economy suffered from a recession that lasted from March 2001 to November 2001. During the Bush Administration, Real GDP has grown at an average annual rate of 2.5%.

Inflation under Bush has remained near historic lows at about 2–3% per year. The recession and a drop in some prices led to concern about deflation from mid-2001 to late 2003. More recently, high oil prices have caused concern about increasing inflation.

Long-term problems include inadequate investment in economic infrastructure, rapidly rising medical and pension costs of an aging population, sizable trade and budget deficits. Under the Bush administration, productivity has grown by an average of 3.76% per year, the highest such average in ten years.

While the GDP recovered from a recession that some claim Bush inherited from the previous administration, poverty has since worsened according to the Census Bureau. The percentage of the population below the poverty level increased in each of Bush's first four years, while it decreased for each of the prior seven years to an 11-year low. Although the poverty level increased the increase was still lower from 2000 to 2002 than it was from 1992 to 1997, which reached a peak of 39.3% in 1993. In 2002 the poverty rate was 34.6% which was almost equal to the rate in 1998, which was 34.5%. Poverty was at 12.7% in 2004.

=== Taxes ===
President Bush won passage for two major tax cuts during his term in office: The Economic Growth and Tax Relief Reconciliation Act of 2001 and the Jobs and Growth Tax Relief Reconciliation Act of 2003. Collectively, they became known, analyzed, and debated as the "Bush tax cuts".

The cuts, scheduled to expire a decade after passage, increased the standard income tax deduction for married couples, eliminated the estate tax, and reduced marginal tax rates. Bush asked Congress to make the tax cuts permanent, but others wanted the cuts to be wholly or partially repealed even before their scheduled expiration, seeing the decrease in revenue while increasing spending as fiscally irresponsible.

Bush's supporters claim that the tax cuts increase the pace of economic recovery and job creation. They also claim that total benefits to wealthier individuals are a reflection of higher taxes paid. Individual income tax rate provisions in the 2001 law, for instance, created larger marginal tax rate decreases for people earning less than US$12,000 than any other earners.

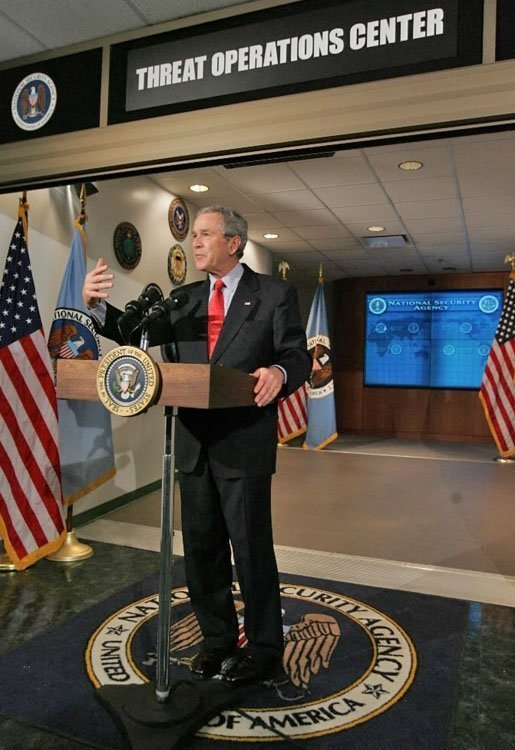
President George W. Bush addresses the media during a visit to the National Security Agency in Fort Meade, Maryland.

His opponents contest job prediction claims, primarily noting that the increase in job creation predicted by Bush's plan failed to materialize. They instead allege that the purpose of the tax cuts was intended to favor the wealthy and special interests, as the majority of benefit from the tax cut, in absolute terms, went to earners in the higher tax brackets. Bush's opponents additionally claim that the tax cuts are a major reason Bush reversed a national surplus into a historically large deficit.

In an open letter to Bush in 2004, more than 100 professors of business and economics at U.S. business schools ascribed this "fiscal reversal" to Bush's "policy of slashing taxes – primarily for those at the upper reaches of the income distribution."

By 2004, these cuts had reduced federal tax revenues, as a percentage of the Gross Domestic Product, to the lowest level since 1959. With the NASDAQ crash and one quarter of negative growth in 2000 it was likely we were headed into a recession, yet merely two years after the 2003 Bush tax cuts, federal revenues (in dollars) had reached a record high. The effect of simultaneous record increases in spending and tax reductions was to create record budget deficits in absolute terms, though as recently as 1993, the deficit was slightly larger than the current 3.6% of the GDP. In the last year of the Clinton administration, the federal budget showed an annual surplus of more than US$230 billion. Under Bush, the government returned to deficit spending. The annual deficit reached an absolute record of US$374 billion in 2003 and then a further record of $413 billion in 2004.

=== Spending ===
President Bush expanded public spending by 70 percent, more than double the increase under President Clinton. Bush was the first president in 176 years to continue an entire term without vetoing any legislation.

The tax cuts, recession, and increases in outlays all contributed to record budget deficits during the Bush administration. The annual deficit reached record current-dollar levels of US$374 billion in 2003 and US$413 billion in 2004. National debt, the cumulative total of yearly deficits, rose from US$5.7 trillion (58% of GDP) to US$8.3 trillion (67% of GDP) under Bush, as compared to the US$2.7 trillion total debt owed when Ronald Reagan left office, which was 52% of the GDP.

According to the "baseline" forecast of federal revenue and spending by the Congressional Budget Office (in its January 2005 Baseline Budget Projections), the budget deficits will decrease over the next several years. In this projection the deficit will fall to US$368 billion in 2005, US$261 billion in 2007, and US$207 billion in 2009, with a small surplus by 2012. The CBO noted, however, that this projection "omits a significant amount of spending that will occur this year — and possibly for some time to come — for U.S. military operations in Iraq and Afghanistan and for other activities related to the global War on Terrorism." The projection also assumes that the Bush tax cuts "will expire as scheduled on December 31, 2010." If, as Bush has urged, the tax cuts were to be extended, then "the budget outlook for 2015 would change from a surplus of US$141 billion to a deficit of US$282 billion." Other economists have disputed this, arguing that the CBO does not use dynamic scoring, to take into account what effect tax cuts would have on the economy.

Federal spending in constant dollars increased under Bush by 26% in his first four and a half years. Non-defense spending increased 18% in that time. Of the US$2.4 trillion budgeted for 2005, about US$450 billion are planned to be spent on defense. This level is generally comparable to the defense spending during the cold war. Congress approved US$87 billion for Iraq and Afghanistan in November, and had approved an earlier US$79 billion package last spring. Most of those funds were for U.S. military operations in the two countries.

Former President Clinton's last budget featured an increase of 16% on domestic non security discretionary spending. Growth under President Bush was cut to 6.2% in his first budget, 5.5% in his second, 4.3% in his third, and 2.2% in his fourth.

=== Trade ===
President Bush signed a large number of free trade agreements into law during his presidency: Jordan (2001), Singapore and Chile (2004), Australia (2005), Dominican Republic, CAFTA, Morocco, Oman, and Bahrain (2006), and Oman and Peru (2009).

The Bush administration also launched trade negotiations with New Zealand, Thailand, Kuwait, Malaysia, Qatar, South Korea, Colombia, and Panama, with some being completed during President Obama's first term in office (2009–2013).

However, Bush resorted to protectionist policies on occasion. Tariffs on imported steel and on Canadian softwood lumber were controversial in light of his advocacy of free market policies in other areas. The steel tariff was later lifted after the World Trade Organization ruled them illegal. Bush explained that the safeguard measures had "achieved their purpose", and "as a result of changed economic circumstances", it was time to lift them. A negotiated settlement to the softwood lumber dispute was reached in April 2006, and the historic seven-year deal was finalized on July 1, 2006.

=== Regulation ===
Some say economic regulation expanded rapidly during the Bush administration. President Bush is described by these observers as the biggest regulator since President Richard Nixon. Bush administration increased the number of new pages in the Federal Registry, a proxy for economic regulation, from 64,438 new pages in 2001 to 78,090 in new pages in 2007, a record amount of regulation. Economically significant regulations, defined as regulations which cost more than $100 million a year, increased by 70%.

Spending on regulation increased by 62% from $26.4 billion to $42.7 billion.

The 2008 financial crisis occurred near the end of the Bush second term and has been regarded by some as an enormous failure of financial deregulation.

=== Employment ===
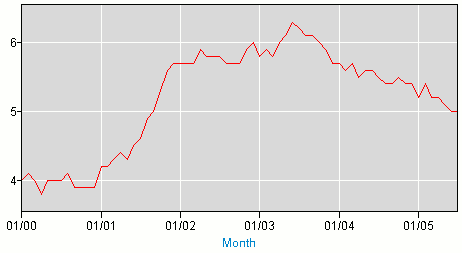
Unemployment percentage, 2000–2005

Looking at the annual average unemployment rates for each of the eight years of Bush's presidency, the average of all eight figures, and thus of his entire presidency, is 5.26%, with a low of 4.6% for the years of 2006 and 2007, and a high of 6.0% for 2003.

According to the Bureau of Labor Statistics, the number of unemployed was nearly 6.0 million in January 2001 and 6.9 million in September 2006. The unemployment rate was 4.2% in January 2001, 4.6% in September 2006, and 7.2% in December 2008. Employment peaked in late 1999 and declined through 2008.

Poverty Rate, 1973 to 2004

The Current Population Survey (aka Household Survey) measures the percentage of the population that is employed and unemployed. The result can be multiplied by population estimates to get total employment estimates. This survey has the advantage over the payroll survey in that it includes self-employed. The Household Survey is less accurate in producing total numbers since it requires population estimates and in that it samples many fewer people (60,000 households versus 400,000 business establishments). For better or worse, the Household Survey counts multiple jobs held by one person only once, and it includes government workers, farm workers, unpaid family workers, and workers absent without pay. The Household Survey indicates that the percentage of the population employed decreased from 64.4% in December 2000 and January 2001 to 62.1% in August and September 2003. By August 2005, it had recovered only to 62.9%. In absolute numbers, this corresponds to a drop of 1.6 million jobs but an eventual net gain of 4.7 million jobs during the Bush administration. Private sector employment, as measured by private nonfarm payrolls, shrank over the 8 years of the George W. Bush presidency. There were modest gains in private-sector payroll employment during his first term, but these were more than offset by the shedding of workers by the private sector in his second term. There were 463,000 fewer private-sector payroll jobs when he left office than when he came into office.

=== Economic Report ===
In 2004, a full chapter on Iraq's economy was excised from the Economic Report of the President, in part because it doesn't fit the "feel good" tone of the writing, according to White House officials.

== Education ==
=== No Child Left Behind ===
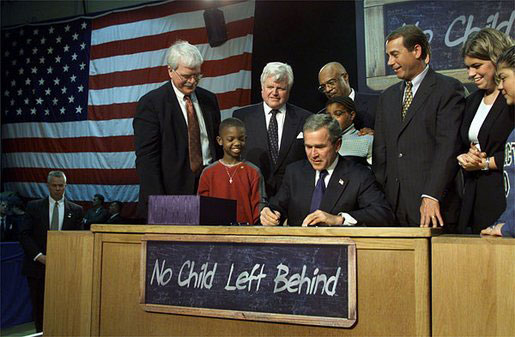
President Bush signing the No Child Left Behind Act into law, January 8, 2002

In January 2002, Bush signed the No Child Left Behind Act, with Democratic Senator Ted Kennedy as chief sponsor, which aims to close the achievement gap, measures student performance, provides options to parents with children in low-performing schools, and targets more federal funding to low-income schools. Critics, including Senator John Kerry and the National Education Association, say schools were not given the resources to help meet new standards, although their argument is based on premise that authorization levels are spending promises instead of spending caps. The House Committee on Education and the Workforce said that the Department of Education's overall funding increased by US$14 billion since the enactment of NCLB in fiscal year 2001, going from US$42.6 billion to US$56.6 billion in fiscal year 2005. Some state governments are refusing to implement provisions of the act as long as they are not adequately funded.

In January 2005, USA Today reported that the United States Department of Education had paid US$240,000 to African-American conservative political commentator Armstrong Williams "to promote the law on his nationally syndicated television show and to urge other black journalist to do the same." Williams did not disclose the payments.

The House Education and Workforce Committee stated, "As a result of the No Child Left Behind Act, signed by Bush on January 8, 2002, the Federal government today is spending more money on elementary and High School (K-12) education than at any other time in the history of the United States." Funding increases have to a large degree been offset at the state level by increased costs associated with implementing NCLB, as well as the impacts of the economic downturn on education budgets.

== Diversity and civil rights ==
=== Faith-based initiatives ===
In early-2001, President Bush worked with Republicans in Congress to pass legislation changing the way the federal government regulated, taxed and funded charities and non-profit initiatives run by religious organizations. Although prior to the legislation it was possible for these organizations to receive federal assistance, the new legislation removed reporting requirements, which required the organizations to separate their charitable functions from their religious functions. Bush also created the White House Office of Faith Based and Community Initiatives. Days into his first term, Bush announced his commitment to channeling more federal aid to faith-based service organizations. Bush created the Office of Faith-Based and Community Initiatives to assist faith-based service organizations. Critics claimed that this was an infringement of the separation of church and state.

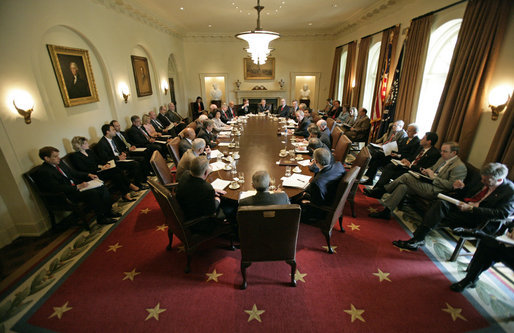
President George W. Bush meets with his cabinet after his re-election.

=== LGBT issues ===
As Governor of Texas, Bush had opposed efforts to repeal the criminal prohibition on "homosexual conduct", the same law that the United States Supreme Court overturned in 2003, Lawrence v. Texas. During the 2000 campaign he did not endorse a single piece of gay rights legislation, although he did meet with an approved group of Log Cabin Republicans, a first for a Republican presidential candidate.

In his first four years of office, his views on gay rights were often difficult to ascertain, but many experts feel that the Bush White House wanted to avoid bad publicity without alienating evangelical conservative Christian voters. Thus, he did not repeal President Clinton's Executive Order banning discrimination based on sexual orientation in the federal civilian government, but its critics felt it was ignored. He did not attempt to repeal Don't ask, don't tell, nor try to change it. He threatened to veto the Matthew Shepard Act, which would have included sexual orientation in hate crimes.

While President Bush had always been on record as opposing the legal recognition of same-sex marriages, the 2004 Republican campaign strategy was to focus on "value issues" such as a Federal Marriage Amendment, that would prohibit same-sex couples from obtaining any legal recognition. President Bush endorsed this proposed amendment, but late in the campaign told ABC News and Larry King that he did not have a problem with state legislators enacting some type of civil unions legislation, although critics charged that the constitutional amendment he endorsed did not permit recognition of such unions.

Bush still expressed support for the Federal Marriage Amendment in his February 2, 2005 State of the Union address and during the 2006 midterm election, but given that it did not even receive majority support in the Senate, has ignored this issue in his most recent public statements and speeches.

Bush was the first Republican president to appoint an openly gay man to serve in his administration, Scott Evertz, as director of the Office of National AIDS Policy. In addition, during Bush's first term, his nominee as ambassador to Romania, Michael E. Guest, became the first openly gay man to be confirmed by the Senate as a U.S. ambassador. The first openly gay ambassador, James Hormel, received a recess appointment from Bill Clinton after the Senate failed to confirm the nomination.

=== Minorities, civil rights and affirmative action ===
Bush endorsed civil rights and appointed black people, women and gay people to high positions. The premier cabinet position, Secretary of State, went to Colin Powell (2001–2005), the first Black at that high a level. He was followed by Condoleezza Rice (2005–2009), the first Black woman. Attorney General Alberto Gonzales (2005–2007) was and remains in 2024 the highest appointed Hispanic in the history of American government. In addition Bush appointed the first senior officials who were publicly gay. However he campaigned against quotas, and warned that affirmative action that involved quotas were unacceptable. He deliberately selected minorities known as opponents of affirmative action for key civil rights positions. Thus in 2001 Bush nominated Linda Chavez to be the first Latina in the cabinet as Secretary of Labor. She had to withdraw when it was reported that a decade earlier she had hired an illegal immigrant.

According to a CNN exit poll, Bush's support from African Americans increased during his presidency from 9% of the black vote in 2000 to 11% in 2004. An increase in Ohio (from 9% to 16%, each ± about 5%) may have helped give the victory to Bush over Kerry.

Although Bush expressed appreciation for the Supreme Court's ruling upholding the selection of college applicants for purposes of diversity, his administration filed briefs against it. Bush has said he opposes government sanctioned and enforced quotas and racial preferences, but that the private and public sector should be encouraged to reach out to accomplished minorities to increase employment diversity.

In August 2005, a report by the United States Commission on Civil Rights states that "the government fails to seriously consider race-neutral alternatives as the Constitution requires." Chairman Gerald A. Reynolds explained, "Federal agencies do not independently evaluate, conduct research, collect data, or periodically review programs to determine whether race-neutral strategies will provide an adequate alternative to race-conscious programs." Civil rights groups expressed concern that the report was an attack on affirmative action inconsistent with Grutter v. Bollinger.

=== Genetic non-discrimination ===
President George W. Bush signed into law the Genetic Information Nondiscrimination Act (GINA). The bill protects Americans against discrimination based on their genetic information when it comes to health insurance and employment. The issue had been debated for 13 years before becoming law. It is designed to protect citizens while not hindering genetic research.

=== Voting rights ===
Bush signed into law the Help America Vote Act in 2002, which was drafted in response to the irregularities of the 2000 U.S. presidential election which brought him into office. It created the Election Assistance Commission, increased accessibility and security standards for polling places and voting systems, mandated state governments to create statewide voter rolls with regular quality maintenance, required state governments to allow voters to use provisional ballots when requested, and mandated that first-time voters present identification to election officials. In 2006, Bush signed the Voting Rights Act Reauthorization and Amendments Act of 2006, which reauthorized the VRA for another 25 years. However, both of his appointees to the Supreme Court - Roberts and Alito - voted with the conservative majority in 2013 to invalidate Section 3 of the Voting Rights Act.

== Workers ==
On March 20, 2001, Bush signed a repeal of workplace safety regulations that were intended to prevent injuries of employees across America. Bush changed the pay rate for federal workers.

== Health ==
=== Health care ===
In July 2002, Bush cut off U.S. funding to the United Nations Population Fund (UNFPA). Bush stated that the UNFPA supported forced abortions and sterilizations in the People's Republic of China.

Bush sought to expand Medicare so it would also cover the cost of prescription drugs, a program that became known as Medicare Part D. Many congressional Democrats opposed the bill because it did not allow Medicare to negotiate the prices of drugs, while many conservative Republicans opposed the expansion of the government's involvement in healthcare. Assisted by Speaker of the House Dennis Hastert and Senate majority leader Bill Frist, Bush overcame strong opposition and won passage of his Medicare bill. In December 2003, Bush signed the Medicare Prescription Drug, Improvement, and Modernization Act, the largest expansion of Medicare since the program's creation in 1965.

Bush signed the Partial-Birth Abortion Ban Act in 2003, having declared his aim to "promote a culture of life".

In 2007, Bush vetoed the expansion of the Children's Health Insurance Program stating his concern that the bill would "federalize health care". His veto was criticized as the bill as insensitive to children's needs. The House of Representatives failed to override Bush's veto on October 18. On December 12, 2007, Bush vetoed a similar bill regarding children's healthcare.

=== Abortion ===
On his first day in office, President Bush implemented the Mexico City Policy. This policy required nongovernmental organizations receiving federal funds to agree not to perform abortions or to actively promote abortion as a method of family planning in other nations. In 2002, President Bush signed the Born-Alive Infants Protection Act, which extends legal protection to infants born alive after failed attempts at induced abortion. Also in 2002, President Bush withdrew funding from the United Nations Population Fund based on a finding that UNPF's activities facilitated China's one-child-only/forced abortion policy. In 2003, President Bush signed the Partial Birth Abortion Ban Act into law; that law was later upheld by the Supreme Court of the United States in Gonzales v. Carhart. President Bush signed the Unborn Victims of Violence Act (Laci and Conner's Law), which provides that a person who commits certain federal violent crimes and thereby causes the death of, or bodily injury to, a fetus shall be guilty of a separate offense, whether or not the person knew the mother was pregnant or intended to harm the fetus.

=== Abstinence ===
The Bush administration promoted abstinence through federal grants.

=== Euthanasia ===
Bush staunchly opposes euthanasia. He supported Ashcroft's decision to file suit against the voter-approved Oregon Death with Dignity Act, which was ultimately decided by the Supreme Court in favor of the Oregon law. As governor of Texas, however, Bush had signed a law which gave hospitals the authority to take terminally ill patients off of life support against the wishes of their spouse or parents, if the doctors deemed it medically appropriate. This became an issue in 2005, when the President signed controversial legislation forwarded and voted on by only three members of the Senate to initiate federal intervention in the Terri Schiavo case.

== Social Security ==
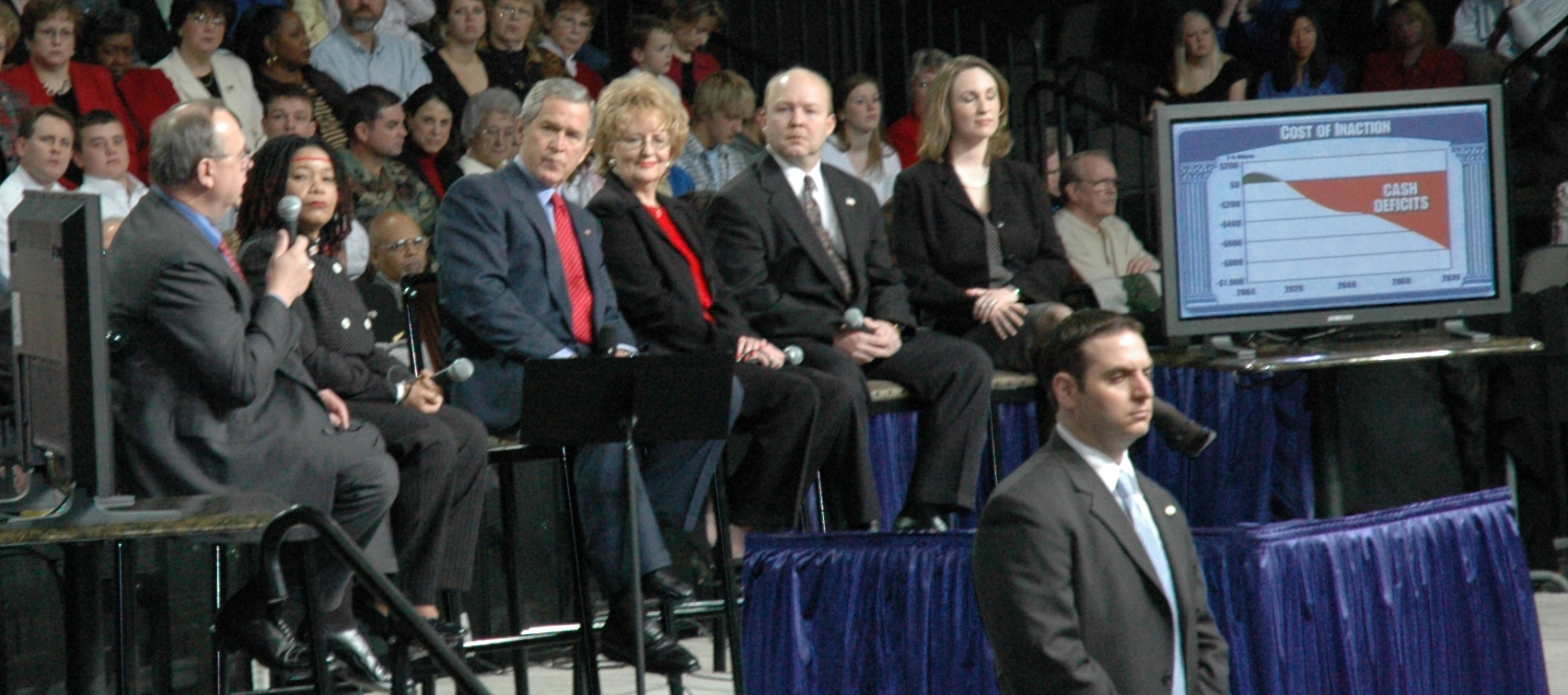
Shortly after his second inauguration, Bush (here seen with a panel in Omaha, Nebraska) toured the nation to promote his proposal for Social Security (United States) personal accounts.

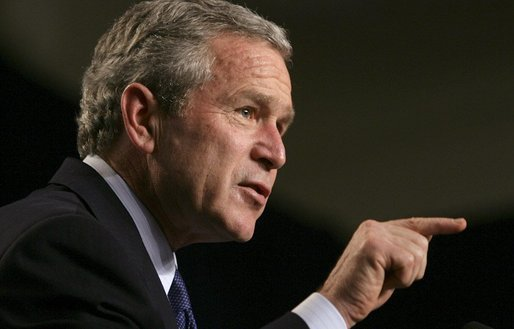
President Bush discussing Social Security reform at the Lake Nona YMCA Family Center in Orlando, Florida, March 18, 2005

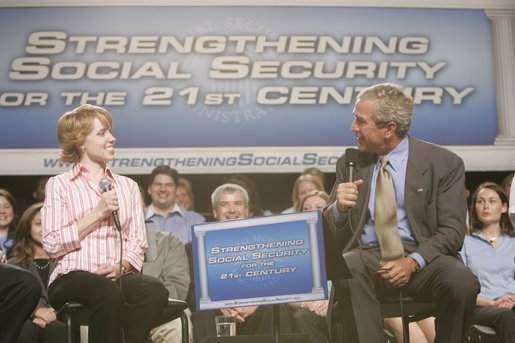
President George W. Bush discussing Social Security in 2005

After winning re-election in 2004, Bush made the partial privatization of Social Security his top domestic priority. He proposed restructuring the program so that citizens could invest some of the money they paid in payroll taxes, which fund the Social Security program. The president argued that Social Security faced an imminent funding crisis and that reform was necessary to ensure its continuing solvency. Bush expected a difficult congressional battle over his proposal, but, as he put it, "I've got political capital, and I intend to spend it." Groups like the AARP strongly opposed the plan, as did moderate Democrats like Max Baucus, who had supported the Bush tax cuts. Ultimately, Bush failed to win the backing of a single congressional Democrat for his plan, and even moderate Republicans like Olympia Snowe and Lincoln Chafee refused to back privatization. In the face of unified opposition, Republicans abandoned Bush's Social Security proposal in mid-2005.

Bush called for major reforms in Social Security, identifying the system's projected insolvency as a priority early in his second term. From January through April 2005, he toured the country, stopping in over 50 cities across the nation warning of an impending "crisis". Initially, President Bush emphasized his proposal for personalized accounts would allow individual workers to invest a portion of their Social Security Tax (FICA) into secured investments. The main advantage of personal accounts within Social Security is to allow workers to own the money they place into retirement that cannot be taken away by political whims.

Most Democrats and some Republicans are critical of such ideas, partly because of the large (US$1 trillion or more) federal borrowing the plan would require, which might actually worsen the imbalance between revenues and expenses that Bush pointed to as a looming problem; and partly because of the problems encountered by the United Kingdom's privatized pension plan. See Social Security debate (United States). In addition, many Democrats opposed changes that they felt were turning Social Security into a welfare program that would be politically vulnerable. Portions of Bush's bill exempting private companies from social security payments have led to complaints that Bush's plan was created to benefit private companies, and that it would turn Social Security into just another insurance program.
