= Advocates for Youth =

U.S. nonprofit organization

Advocates for Youth is a nonprofit organization and advocacy group based in Washington, D.C., United States, dedicated to sexuality education, the prevention of HIV and of sexually transmitted disease, teenage pregnancy prevention, youth access to condoms and contraception (including emergency contraception), equality for LGBT youth, and youth participation. In addition, Advocates for Youth sponsors media campaigns and other forms of outreach which attempt to change societal norms to be more understanding of, accepting, of, and responsible about youth sexuality and to drive youth sexual health equity.

Advocates for Youth has both domestic and international programs and creates and funds programs as well as lobbying for policies, including the Responsible Education About Life Act. Among its work is the preparation of educational materials, such as a publicity kit encouraging parents to talk to their children about HIV prevention, under contract from government bodies such as the Centers for Disease Control.

== Mission and vision ==
Advocates for Youth's mission reads: "Advocates for Youth champions efforts to help young people make informed and responsible decisions about their reproductive and sexual health. Advocates believes it can best serve the field by boldly advocating a more positive and realistic approach to adolescent sexual health."

The organization also has a vision that is described in terms of its core values, the "3Rs". Those three Rs are rights (to accurate and complete sexual health information, confidential reproductive and sexual health services, and a secure stake in the future), respect (for youth by involving them in all aspects of programs that affect them), and responsibility (to provide youth with tools to safeguard sexual health, and for youth to protect themselves from pregnancy and STIs). Current sexuality education programs vary widely in the accuracy of content, emphasis, and effectiveness. Studies have shown that programs vary in effectiveness for all ages, races and ethnicities, socioeconomic groups, and geographic areas. The values of Advocates for Youth come from the observations of participants on an annual study tour in France, Germany, and the Netherlands that Advocates for Youth conducts to investigate reasons for better sexual health outcomes in those countries. In the United States, only 28 states are obligated to teach both sex education and HIV education in public schools.

== Policies ==
James Wagoner, the former president of Advocates for Youth, has described the organization's policies as an outgrowth of their support for "research-based public health policy" - rather than politically motivated. The organization vocally opposed the sex education policies of George W. Bush's presidential administration, also criticizing the restoration of funds to abstinence-only education during the passage of the Affordable Care Act (Obamacare). Policy priorities at the state, national, and foreign policy levels all focus around the general areas of reproductive health, rights and justice, and access to comprehensive LGBTQ-affirming, culturally responsive sex education, STI prevention, HIV prevention, treatment and care, and LGBT youth health and rights.

== Programs ==
Advocates for Youth works heavily in collaboration with national, state, and local groups to run a number of initiatives. These focus on goals including contraceptive access for youth, prevention of unplanned pregnancy, STI prevention, comprehensive LGBTQ-affirming and culturally responsive sex education, sex education teacher training, and ending homophobia and transphobia against youth. All the programs and initiatives heavily involve youth as stakeholders. The Youth Activist Network, one of the biggest programs, focuses on youth activism and leadership. Young people work in partnership with Advocates' staff to implement campaigns and mobilize their peers in support of youth sexual health rights and justice.

== See also ==
- Youth advocate
