= Don't Drop the Soap =

Board game

Don't Drop the Soap is a controversial prison-themed board game designed by art student John Sebelius as a class project at the Rhode Island School of Design. The game received criticism for its content, most notably for the game's treatment of prison rape. Sebelius also received notice for being the son of Governor of Kansas Kathleen Sebelius and U.S. Magistrate Judge K. Gary Sebelius. The game officially went on sale on January 31, 2008 in Lawrence, Kansas and through Sebelius' personal website, and is considered to be similar to Monopoly in its gameplay.

== Gameplay ==
The gameplay consists of six levels and can be played by up to three people. Users can choose to play as Sal "The Butcher", "Anferny", or "Wheelz", a disabled prisoner. The ultimate goal of the game is for the player to make parole without dropping the soap in the prison shower. If a prisoner drops the soap, they will bend over to pick it up, only to be subjected to rape by fellow inmates.

== Reaction ==
The National Prison Rape Elimination Commission, a U.S. bipartisan panel aimed at curbing prison rape, criticized the game and stated that the title made light of "a serious and all-too-pervasive violent sex crime." The Pitch criticized Sebelius, labelling him "The Idiot Son of an Elected Official." Politician Tim Huelskamp requested that the game be investigated and voiced concerns that the game was being marketed and stored at Cedar Crest, the Governor's mansion.

Sebelius responded to the criticism, explaining that he meant for the game to be a lighthearted spoof and was not an endorsement of prison rape.

== See also ==
- List of board games
