= Brenda Smith =

Brenda Smith may refer to:

- Brenda V. Smith, American law professor
- Brenda Smith (model)
