= Protective pairing =

Prison terminology

In the field of penology, protective pairing is a form of prison violence in which one inmate agrees to protect another inmate in exchange for servitude, typically in the form of sex with the protector, which can include prostitution arrangements with other prisoners.

The term was coined by activist Stephen Donaldson.

== See also ==
- Prison sexuality
- Prison rape
- Transactional sex
- T. J. Parsell
- Prison gang
- Eunuch
