= Environmental policy of the Bush administration =

Environmental policy of the Bush administration may refer to:

== George H. W. Bush ==
- Presidency of George H. W. Bush#Environment
- Environmental policy of the United States#The George H. W. Bush Administration (1989–1993)

== George W. Bush ==
- Presidency of George W. Bush#Environmental policies
- George W. Bush#Environmental policies
- Domestic policy of the George W. Bush administration#Environment
- Environmental policy of the United States#The George W. Bush Administration (2001–2009)
