= No Escape: Male Rape in U.S. Prisons =

2001 report by Human Rights Watch

No Escape: Male Rape in U.S. Prisons is the title of an influential, book-length 2001 report by Human Rights Watch on prison rape in the United States. The report is credited with playing a major role in the 2003 passage of the Prison Rape Elimination Act.

== Background ==
Human Rights Watch (HRW) had published several papers on the topic of prison rape in the years since its initial report on the topic in 1996. The 1996 paper, "All too Familiar: Sexual Abuse of Women in U.S. State Prisons", was released during a time when there was almost no Congressional support for legislation aimed at preventing prison rape.

By 2001, no reliable national statistics existed on sexual violence in U.S. prisons. There were, however, a few studies of prison rape within individual states prior to the start of the "No Escape" study in 1996. A survey in Nebraska that year indicated that 22 percent of inmates had been forced into sexual activity during their stint in the prison system.

== Authors ==
The report was authored by Joanne Mariner, at the time the deputy director of the Americas Division of Human Rights Watch. The research was a collaborative effort by HRW staff, interns and other individuals.

== Report ==
The study began in 1996, when announcements were published in Prison Legal News and Prison Life Magazine, both widely circulated within U.S. prisons. Soon after, the report's primary author, Mariner, received thousands of letters from inmates, many detailing rapes. The book-length "No Escape: Male Rape in U.S. Prisons" was released on April 19, 2001. The report documented that prison rape was commonplace during a time when half of U.S. states compiled no statistics on the subject. Brent Staples described the report, which was based partly on the testimony of over 200 inmate victims, as "grisly".

"No Escape" surveyed 34 states' prison systems. The report documented lurid accounts of prison rape, wherein inmates were being sold to other inmates as sex slaves. Men, instead of being beaten into submission, were coerced into sexual activity, sometimes while prison officials stood by. In the report a group of six Texas inmates told HRW that sexual slavery "is commonplace in the system's most dangerous prison units." "No Escape" identified prisons run by the Texas Department of Criminal Justice as the worst for incidents of prison rape; this assertion was confirmed by later reports. The report also collated similar testimony from inmates in Arkansas, Illinois, Michigan, and California.

"No Escape: Male Rape in U.S. Prisons" blamed indifference and feigned ignorance by prison officials for the widespread existence of male inmate on inmate sexual violence in American prisons. When HRW queried Nebraska for information while compiling "No Escape" they were told that incidents were "minimal"; New Mexico told HRW no reported incidents had occurred in the past few years. Numerous other states had similar responses that characterized such incidents as rare or not a problem; among those states the Department of Corrections in Alaska, Connecticut and Kentucky all noted they did not keep records of sexual violence reports.

== Reaction ==
The release of "No Escape" has been called the event that contributed most to the passage of Prison Rape Elimination Act (PREA) two years later. The report was cited in Congressional testimony surrounding the legislation which became law in September 2003. The report cast incidents of prison rape as widespread, a contention that was dismissed as "overblown" by many prison officials.

Regardless, the study was featured on the front page of The New York Times and other publications followed suit with coverage of the issue. The media coverage introduced the reality of prison rape to many citizens for the first time. Indeed, the text of PREA acknowledges the fact that it is dealing with a little-known crime, both in the general public and amongst those in government.

== See also ==
- Scott Glosserman
- Prison rape in the United States
