= Prison sexuality =

Sexual relationships in prisons

Prison sexuality (or prison sex or penitentiary sex) consists of sexual relationships between prisoners or between a prisoner and a prison employee or other persons to whom prisoners have access. Since prisons are usually separated by sex, most sexual activity is with a same-sex partner. Exceptions to this include sex with spouses/partners of the opposite sex during conjugal visits and sex with a prison employee of the opposite sex.

Prison sexuality is an issue that has been commonly misunderstood and misrepresented due not only to the taboo nature of the subject, but also because of a lack of research. Contrary to popular belief, the most common kind of sexual activity in prisons is consensual sex; however, many jurisdictions, including the United States Federal Code, have laws that prohibit an inmate from having the capacity to consent.

A 2011 study developed a taxonomy for different types of sexual behaviors in women's prison. They include suppression, in which an inmate chooses celibacy (i.e., refrains from sexual activity while in prison, most commonly to stay loyal to a partner who is outside of prison); autoeroticism (i.e., masturbation); true homosexuality (consensual sex between inmates who were already homosexual before entering prison); situational homosexuality (consensual sex between inmates who have homosexual experiences for the first time in prison); and sexual violence (which can be between inmates or between a staff member and an inmate). Sexual violence includes coercion, manipulation, and compliance. Manipulation is performed for power or some kind of reward. Compliance occurs to obtain safety or protection or out of fear.

In general, prisoner–prisoner relationships are same-sex relationships because prisons are generally segregated by sex. An example of an exception to this general rule took place in Canada at the Sainte-Anne-des-Plaines prison. There, two convicted killers of the opposite sex, Karla Homolka and Jean-Paul Gerbet, were able to engage in sexual activity through a chain-link fence, which was the only barrier separating men and women. This prison is Canada's highest security prison to which inmates of either sex may be sent if considered especially dangerous.

== Prisoner–prisoner relationships ==
=== Female prisoners ===
The first research done on prison sexuality was on women in 1913. In 1931, researcher Selling found that different levels of relationships exist between women in prison (and female juvenile facilities), such as "friendship, pseudofamily membership, pseudohomosexuality, and overt homosexuality". The forming of pseudofamilies have been more common in women prisons. These are families women create in prison that provide them support, bonds and relationships, like a traditional family would. Typically, only the main couple in the family has sexual relations. The women take on masculine and feminine roles to mimic a traditional heterosexual family. "Mammy" or "mumsy" is given to an older, maternal woman in the family, and "Popsy" is given to a dominant woman, who is least feminine. These "parents" are typically older and are seen as mentors to younger inmates. Roles within pseudofamilies are flexible and can change with time.

In 1965, Ward and Kassebaum conducted research in Frontera through questionnaires and concluded from staff and inmates that "between 30% and 75% of the inmates had sexual affairs while in prison", 50% of those engaging in same-sex sexual activity. Sexual intercourse between these women were typically for fun and enjoyment, sometimes transitioning into a serious relationship. Furthermore, these relationships occurred between women who were housed together or between women of different races; same-race relations are not as typical. After a survey taken in a study conducted by Propper in 1976, his results for reasons for homosexual relationships include "game playing, economic manipulation, loneliness, the need for companionship, and genuine affection".^{[4]} Researcher Otis studied what was seen as "unnatural relationships" between interracial women. In 2014, consensual sexual relationships between women in UK prisons were described as "commonplace" by The Daily Telegraph.

In homosexual relationships, sexual types for women include: "butch" or “daddy" refers to the masculine woman who is dominant. The "femme" or "mommy" is the submissive one. A "trick" is a girl who allows herself to be used by others. A "commissary hustler" is manipulative. "Cherries" have never had lesbian experiences and a "square" will not take part in homosexual acts.

=== Male prisoners ===
Prison sexuality for men has been studied since the 1930s. Research is lacking on consensual sex, as most research done has focused on coercion. Sexual abuse is more common among male inmates. Men sexually abuse others to establish dominance, power and to maintain their masculinity. In protective pairing, men who are physically weaker will offer consensual sex in exchange for protection, security, goods or support.

Heterosexual men in prison view their homosexual acts as being situational and may not consider themselves bisexual. These men often describe how they imagine being with a woman while taking part in sexual activity with a male inmate. During masturbation, they picture past sexual experiences with women. They take part in homosexual activity due to having no “heterosexual outlets”.

A dominant sexual partner in prison is called "daddy" while their submissive partner is called "kid" or “girl”. The dominant partner has their mate take on the feminine role in order to feel more masculine and powerful.

Jonathan Schwartz's research in the documentary Turned Out: Sexual Assault Behind Bars found that "in male prison populations where entitlement to (anal and oral) penetration (or perhaps possessing a 'wife') is the ultimate symbol of domination – [it is] part of the symbolic economy of an all-male, hyper-masculinist environment."

=== Mixed-sex prisons ===
While most prisons exclusively house inmates of either gender, there are some facilities that house both men and women. Within such institutions there are cases where inmates engage in heterosexual sex with prisoners of the opposite gender. Additionally, there have even been instances in which married couples are held in the same location. However such sexual encounters are not very common and can be difficult for the inmates to arrange with each other as a result of the men and women being separated from each other and the fact that the prisoners are closely monitored by the prison officers.

This specific kind of interaction between inmates is gaining more attention, due to the benefits it seems to provide for inmates. For instance, inmates in these relationships experience a lower level of romantic loneliness, a higher level of sexual satisfaction, as well as increased quality of life compared to inmates with a spouse/romantic partner outside of the jail or inmates with no partner whatsoever. This suggests that inmates in the same prison will benefit from developing relationships with other inmates. In the rare instances where inmates are permitted contact with incarcerated members of the opposite sex, intimate relationships are shown to be beneficial for the inmates' interpersonal and psychological state.

== Prisoners and other relationships ==
Around the world many prisons offer conjugal visits to the partners of inmates, in which prisoners are permitted to spend time in private rooms, with their partners in a prison-facilitated environment like private apartment-style rooms within the prison itself or the inmates are taken to meet their spouses in secure locations such as trailers or cabins. During conjugal visits the inmate and their partners may even be provided with supplies such as soap, towels, bed linens, condoms, lubricant, and even G-rated (in the United States) DVDs. Conjugal visits are restricted to only inmates with good behavior, and in some jurisdictions this is only permitted for married couples, while others allow domestic partners.

Inmates might also engage in heterosexual relationships during work release programs, in which a prisoner is sufficiently monitored by a supervisor or trusted enough to temporarily leave the prison to work at a place of employment before returning to the prison. During the working shift, inmates have taken advantage of the temporary freedom to engage in sex with either their work release supervisor, a co-worker from their place of employment, or anyone else they can manage to contact. However such relations are not allowed and thus any inmate caught engaging in such activity may face punishments such as being excluded from the work release programs.

In prisons with high enough levels of corruption, inmates with considerable amounts of wealth and influence, such as crime bosses and/or drug lords, have been known to use their money to bribe the prison staff, so as to allow outsiders, such as prostitutes or even intimate partners, to enter into the prisons for sexual activity with the inmates. However prison staff that engage in such misconduct risk being temporarily suspended or fired if their corruption is exposed, along with possible prosecution.

Relations also occur between correctional staff and inmates. Due to the power dynamic of staff over the inmates, tight quarters and restriction of sexual relations, prisoners are in a vulnerable position toward staff members. Personnel of the staff include: security staff, teachers, case managers, counselors, medical workers, work release supervisors, contractors and religious workers; additionally there have also been cases of inmates having relations with lawyers visiting clients in the prison. At times there are even cases of women becoming pregnant as a result of sexual relations between inmates and staff. Although not allowed, many times this would be the only opportunity for inmates to engage in heterosexual relations. In some jurisdictions, sexual relations by prison staff with inmates are illegal regardless of consent.

Additionally prison inmates with contraband such as mobile web have been known to use their smartphones and/or tablet computers to either watch pornography or to engage in sexting, phone sex or cybersex with people outside of the prisons.

A government report in the UK in 2014 found that female prisoners in England and Wales have been coerced into sex with staff in exchange for alcohol and cigarettes. Some sexbot manufacturers have argued that introducing sexbots into prisons will have the positive effect of reducing prison rapes and reducing sexual tension.

== Prison rape ==
Prison is a community sexologically characterized by overt masturbation and by homosexual couplings that may be consensual, coercive or assaultive (rape). Prison rape is defined differently from state to state but is understood to be non-consensual or unwanted sexual contact between individuals. Prison rape can be between inmates or inmates and staff of the prison. This is a form of sexuality because these individuals use their capacity for sexual feelings to intimidate or control their victims which causes sociological properties of the prison to change.

According to research done in 1980, prisoners have two overarching reasons to rape a victim. One is to satisfy their overt sexual- and need-based desires that self-pleasure cannot. The second is to use the assault as a sort of intimidation factor to grant the rapist power in a place where these actions generally go unpunished. In prison, the term "booty bandit" is used to describe an inmate who would rape another (in the case of men). There seems to be no correlation shown that men who are abusive to their partners outside of prison are more likely to be rapists in prisons. Such men are not known to have a history of sexual assault before prison.

According to the 2001 Human Rights Watch report "No Escape: Male Rape in U.S. Prisons", sexual slavery is frequently posed as a consensual sexual relationship inside prisons. Rape victims are often intimidated into feigning consent to sexual activity, to the point of becoming "slaves" and the figurative property of their rapists.

Prospective slaveholders will sometimes use intimidating innuendo, as opposed to overt threats of violence, which the prospective slave unwillingly accepts, thereby disguising the coercive nature of the sexual activity from even the enslaver. Victims might not even see themselves as being coerced if the abuse is negotiated as repayment for a debt. The trauma of the sexual violations often affects men as it threatens their sense of masculinity, gender identity and sexual orientation. The HRW report contains an account in which an inmate is feeling this way. It concludes that in prison, consent is inherently illusory.

In 2003, for the first time ever, the United States government moved to protect prisoners from sexual violence. With pressure from human rights groups, the U.S. House of Representatives and Senate unanimously passed the Prison Rape Elimination Act (PREA) to protect prisoners from sexual violence.

=== In news media ===
The printed news media in the historical era emphasized the issue of prison rape by establishing a social problem and blaming the U.S. correction system. According to major newspapers, the U.S. correction system not only involved the correctional personnel but the inmates who engaged in homosexual behavior. Later in the contemporary era, print news media shifted the United States' focus on prison rape from a framed-problem perspective to a political rights and civil rights issue within the U.S. correction system.

The issue of prison rape gained national attention in the press, thus creating an open door for new perspectives on how to understand and eliminate the issue. News media contributed to the U.S. government's initiative to intervene in the matter.

== Discrimination in prison sexuality ==
=== Gender discrimination ===
Studies conducted by Cindy Struckman-Johnson conclude that 22 percent of male inmates have either been coerced or persuaded into sexual acts in prison. Sexual assault in prison is not exclusive to male prisons. Female prisoners experience sexual assault in a different way. By 1998, there were over 138,000 women in the prison system. While this is the case, the majority of prison guards are male. There is evidence that women prisoners are coerced into sex by prison staff in exchange for "drugs, favors, and promises of more lenient treatment." Female inmates also report that guards and staff watch them shower and undress, as well improperly touch them during pat-downs.

=== LGBTQ+ discrimination ===
Members of the LGBTQ+ community are incarcerated at higher rates than heterosexual people in the United States. There is a significant demographic of LGBTQ+ individuals within the criminal justice system. The Bureau of Justice Statistics, a branch of the Department of Justice, reports that gay and lesbian men and women are ten times more likely to be sexually assaulted in prison by another inmate. Additionally, they are 2.6 times more likely than heterosexual inmates to be sexually assaulted by prison staff.

==== Transgender and intersex Inmates ====
Transgender inmates in particular face tougher discrimination than any other prison demographic. Not only do they object to the standard requirement that they be imprisoned with other members of their biological sex, but the lack of facilities for transgender inmates is discriminatory in nature. The concept of differentiating the sexes in prisons is called sex segregation. The separate men's and women's prisons bring forward issues for transgender and intersex people who are incarcerated.

While it is known that discrimination exists against transgender and intersex prisoners, there is little data on the issue thus far. This is due to the fact that jails and prisons are segregated by binary sex. There are studies that demonstrate that compared to the United Kingdom (before official guidance changed), transgender inmates in the United States were much less likely to be housed with other members of the gender they identify with.

The treatment of transgender inmates also varies across different jurisdictions in the United States. The most inclusive states allow for inmates to be segregated based on their gender identity on their Department of Motor Vehicle identification card. Others states such as Tennessee have restrictive laws against gender identification in prisons. The state of Tennessee only allows inmates to be housed based on their biological sex on their birth certificate, which in this state cannot be changed.

The lack of autonomy for transgender people in prison to decide where they should be housed is discriminatory and dangerous in nature. It leads to more sexual assaults from other prisoners and prison personnel. A study conducted in California concluded that transgender people in prison are 13 times more likely to be a victim of sexual assault.

== Inmate contraceptive access ==
Even though the state law prohibits all sex acts, sex still takes place in prison whether widely consensual or violently coerced. Health advocates believe that condoms should be available for everyone to prevent the spread of HIV/AIDS and other sexually transmitted infections and since sex is going to happen in the prisons, it should be safe. Organizations like the World Health Organization and the Joint United Nations Program On HIV/AIDS believe that condoms should be available to prisoners and have been insistent on it for more than a decade. Despite their attempts to provide condoms some places still do not provide them. Conversations in the United States can be filled with judgments as to what prisoners do not deserve, and condoms are a part of this. While the conversations take place the infection rates of HIV and other STIs continue to rise, severely affecting both the inmates and the community.

As of September 2013, condoms are available inside prisons in Canada, most of the European Union, Australia, Brazil, Indonesia, South Africa, and the US state of Vermont. In September 2014, a law was passed in California when Governor Jerry Brown signed the Assembly Bill 966 also known as the Prisoner Protections for Family and Community Health Act to require the state to hand out condoms and make them available to inmates in 34 of its prison facilities. This bill protects the prisoner's health as well while being cost effective. For the state, condom distribution is a low cost method to prevent the transmission of HIV and sexually transmitted infections since individual HIV treatments are costly.

As of 12 September 2016, a California bill passed stating that birth control and hygiene products are allowed for women inmates to use if they are prescribed by their physician. All forms of birth control approved by the United States Food and Drug Administration (FDA) will be made available to all inmates capable of becoming pregnant.

=== Debate over condoms in the U.S. ===
Multiple factors contribute to the debate over providing condoms to prisoners, one is that of political standings. In the U.S. in particular, prison officials believe that providing condoms amounts to condoning sex, which in some places is illegal. In 1999 some penal systems participated in condom distribution including San Francisco, Washington D.C, and New York City. Without condoms, some prisoners are forced to improvise, such as using foam to prevent transmission of HIV.

== HIV testing ==
The amount of STIs in prisons is eight-ten times higher than the general population among both men and women.

Many of these incarcerated individuals with drug-related crime have participated in unsafe injection or have sexual risk for HIV and other sexually transmitted or infectious diseases. Even though correctional administrators deny it, sexual activity and drug use take place in prisons. HIV/AIDS and sexually transmitted infections are transmitted by unprotected sex and sharing contaminated drug injection equipment in these correctional facilities. Many prisoners are infected while incarcerated which can affect their personal health, spread infectious diseases to other inmates, and eventually their sexual partner in the community. Because the rate of STIs is much higher in prison, some prisons provide voluntary HIV testing and counseling to educate and reduce HIV risk behavior. Some prisoners refuse to voluntarily get tested for HIV because they fear their results will not remain confidential among the staff and that they will be discriminated against.

Health is a priority for many prisons, especially when prisoners return to their communities once their sentence is complete.

== Social constructionist approach ==
Some explanations for prison sexuality include the social constructionist theory by Groth. He implies that sexuality is not only an "inherent part" of a person but also that it may be a "construct of that person's society". Additionally, he mentions that you cannot classify the prisoner's sexuality as heterosexual or homosexual during their prison time because it could not be accurate; their sexuality is on hold meanwhile because they act rather on personal needs than interpersonal needs. This, however does not fully conclude that this is the sole reason for prison relationships because they also feel the genuine connection that can turn into a serious relationship.

A similar perspective was penned by Donald Clemmer, who in 1940 theorized that inmates engaged in homosexual behavior partly as they "were deprived of a heteronormative sexual identity". As sexuality has been historically separated into heterosexual or homosexual categories, this deprivation model of an inmate satisfying their needs at the cost of changing from heterosexual to homosexual fits with the social constructionist theory.

In 1958, Gresham Sykes created the deprivation model. In this model, heterosexual inmates struggle with deprivation and create a prison subculture. Inmates are deprived of their sexual needs and desire some activity, resort to masturbation, consensual or coerced sex.

John Irwin and Donald Cressey created the importation model in 1962. With this model, inmates create a unique prison culture based on values from the outside. The social constructionist model is made up of social situations and values.

== See also ==
- Down-low culture
- LGBT people in prison
- Prison rape
- Protective pairing
- Prison Rape Elimination Act of 2003
- Relationships for incarcerated individuals
- Sexual misconduct
- Situational sexual behavior
