= Prison Rape Elimination Act of 2003 =

American law

- Long title: An Act to provide for the analysis of the incidence and effects of prison rape in Federal, State, and local institutions and to provide information, resources, recommendations, and funding to protect individuals from prison rape.
- Acronyms (colloquial): PREA
- Enacted by: the 108th United States Congress
- Effective: September 4, 2003; 23 years ago

Citations
- Public law: 108-79
- Statutes at Large: 117 Stat. 972

Codification
- Titles amended: Title 42—The Public Health and Welfare
- U.S.C. sections created: 42 U.S.C. ch. 147 § 15601 et seq.

Legislative history
- Introduced in the Senate as S. 1435 by Jeff Sessions (R–AL) on July 21, 2003; Committee consideration by House Judiciary; Passed the Senate on July 21, 2003 (unanimous consent); Passed the House of Representatives on July 25, 2003 (without objection); Signed into law by President George W. Bush on September 4, 2003

Major amendments
- Second Chance Act of 2007

The Prison Rape Elimination Act of 2003 (PREA) is the first United States federal law intended to deter the sexual assault of prisoners. The bill was signed into law on September 4, 2003.

== Background ==
Public awareness of prison rape is relatively recent and estimates of its prevalence vary widely.

In 1974, Carl Weiss and David James Friar wrote that 46 million Americans would one day be incarcerated; of that number, they claimed, 10 million would be raped. A 1992 estimate from the Federal Bureau of Prisons estimated that between 9 and 20 percent of inmates had been sexually assaulted. Studies in 1982 and 1996 both concluded that the rate was somewhere between 12 and 14 percent. A 1986 study by Daniel Lockwood put the number at around 23 percent for maximum security prisons in New York. In contrast, in Christine Saum's 1994 survey of 101 inmates, only five admitted to have had been sexually assaulted.

In 2001, Human Rights Watch (HRW) released a paper called No Escape: Male Rape in U.S. Prisons, the single event that contributed most to PREA's passage two years later. HRW had published several papers on the topic of prison rape in the years since its initial report called All Too Familiar: Sexual Abuse of Women in U.S. State Prisons, released in 1996, when there was barely any Congressional support for legislation aimed at prison rape. A 1998 attempt by Representative John Conyers, Jr. (D-MI), known as the Custodial Sexual Abuse Act of 1998, was attached to the reauthorization bill for the Violence Against Women Act but summarily removed and never reintroduced.

Michael Horowitz, a Hudson Institute senior fellow, has been credited with playing a part in passing PREA by helping to lead a coalition of the bill's supporters.

== Support and lobby ==
The Prison Rape Elimination Act of 2003 was supported by a broad base of activists, lobbyists, and organizations, particularly Just Detention International. The Southern Baptist Ethics & Religious Liberty Commission lobbied for the passage of the legislation as did the conservative organization Concerned Women for America. These groups were part of a diverse coalition of human rights and religious groups which backed the legislation; other groups which supported the act were: Amnesty International USA, Focus on the Family, Human Rights Watch, the NAACP, the National Association of Evangelicals, Penal Reform International, Physicians for Human Rights, the Presbyterian Church USA, Prison Fellowship, the Salvation Army and the Union of American Hebrew Congregations.

The bill was sponsored, in both houses of the U.S. Congress, by a bipartisan group of legislators. The initial sponsor of the bill in the Senate was Jeff Sessions (R-AL) and, in the House of Representatives the legislation was sponsored by Representative Frank Wolf (R-VA) and Rep. Bobby Scott (D-VA), who was the initial co-sponsor. The Senate bill picked up four co-sponsors on the day it was passed, they were: Senators Mike DeWine (R-OH), Dick Durbin (D-IL), Dianne Feinstein (D-CA), and Edward Kennedy (D-MA). The House bill had a total of 32 co-sponsors, including Scott. The bill passed both the House and Senate by unanimous consent; it passed the Senate on July 21, 2003, and the House on July 25.

== Act ==
=== Provisions ===
The Act was passed by both houses of the U.S. Congress and subsequently signed by President George W. Bush in a White House ceremony on September 4, 2003. The act aimed to curb prison rape through a "zero-tolerance" policy, as well as thorough research and information gathering. The act called for developing national standards to prevent incidents of sexual violence in prison. It also made policies more available and obvious. By making data on prison rape more available to the prison administrators as well as making corrections facilities more accountable for incidents pertaining to sexual violence and of prison rape, it would more than likely decrease the crimes.

A major component of PREA was the establishment of a "National Prison Rape Reduction Commission." The panel was established by the act and appointed in June 2004, though the law itself called for the commission's creation within 60 days of its passage. The panel, known as the National Prison Rape Elimination Commission (NPREC), was charged with undertaking a study on the comprehensive effects of prison rape and its occurrences. The commission was also charged with information gathering through a variety of sources including public hearings. The commission is tasked with issuing a report to include its findings, conclusions and any recommendations.

In addition, the law mandated that the U.S. Department of Justice (DOJ) "make the prevention of prison rape a top priority in each prison system". The DOJ's Bureau of Justice Statistics was mandated to produce an annual report on its activities concerning the topic of prison rape in the U.S. prison system. The law also made several other mandates for the DOJ. The National Institute of Corrections (NIC) was ordered to offer training and technical assistance, provide a clearinghouse for information and produce its own annual report to Congress. PREA required the DOJ to create a review panel designed to conduct hearings on prison rape; this panel was given subpoena power as well. At the top of the Justice Department, PREA authorized the Attorney General to dispense grant money to facilitate implementation of the act. These grants are administered by the Bureau of Justice Assistance (BJA) and the National Institute of Justice (NIJ).

Representative Danny K. Davis (D-IL) introduced the Second Chance Act of 2007 on March 20 of that year. Among its provisions was an amendment to PREA. The miscellaneous provisions of what was largely a law designed to help reintegrate criminal offenders into the community extended the existence of the NPREC from 3 to 5 years after its inception date. The Senate version was introduced nine days later and sponsored by then-Senator Joe Biden (D-DE). The Second Chance Act passed the House 347–62 on November 13, 2007. The bill passed the Senate by unanimous consent on March 11, 2008, and the life of the NPREC was extended when President Bush signed the Second Chance Act on April 9, 2008.

=== Juvenile justice ===
PREA covers all adult, as well as juvenile detention facilities; the definition of prison for the purposes of the act includes "any juvenile facility used for the custody or care of juvenile inmates." U.S. Congress, within the text of PREA, noted that young, first-time offenders are at an increased risk of sexually motivated crimes. Juveniles held in adult facilities are five times more likely to be sexually assaulted than juveniles held in juvenile facilities.

=== Signing statement ===
Upon signing PREA, President Bush issued a signing statement to accompany the law's passage. The signing statement specifically exempted the executive branch from two parts of Section 7 of PREA. Section 7 deals with access for the NPREC to any federal department or agency's information that it deemed necessary to complete its job. The two specific sections that the signing statement allowed the executive branch to ignore if "disclosure could impair deliberative processes of the Executive or the performance of the Executive's constitutional duties" were 7(h) and 7(k)3. The signing statement maintained that this was within the Constitutional authority of the president.

=== Temporary lock-ups ===
PREA defines "prison" quite broadly, as "any federal, state, or local confinement facility, including local jails, police lockups, juvenile facilities, and state and federal prisons." Thus, short-term lockups, such as holding facilities, and local jails, regardless of size, are also subject to the provisions of PREA. Failure by local authorities and operators of such facilities to comply with the provisions of PREA results in a 5% reduction in federal funding to that agency for each year they fail to comply.

== Implementation ==
The Department of Justice fully implemented and mandated the act by 2012.

=== Grants ===
PREA authorizes money in the form of grants for a wide variety of implementation associated activities. The grants can be utilized by state agencies for personnel, training, technical assistance, data collection, and equipment to prevent, investigate, and prosecute prison rape. Each state recipient is required to submit a report within 90 days laying out on what activities the money was spent on as well as the effect of those activities on prison rape within the state. In 2004 Congress appropriated US$25 million dollars for the grant program and in 2005 US$20 million. The Bureau of Justice Assistance (BJA) granted $10 million of the 2004 appropriation in the fourth quarter of that year. The largest grant amount that year, $1 million, was to the Department of Corrections in Iowa, Michigan, New York, Texas and Washington.

In 2025, the Trump administration canceled $16 million in funding to the Department of Justice National PREA Resource Center.

=== Immigration detention centers ===
PREA also applies to all federal immigration detention centers. In December 2006, NPREC held two days of hearings focusing on sexual violence and rape in immigration detention facilities. During the hearings they heard testimony from a female victim of sexual assault in an immigration facility as well as testimony from prison staff. The panel issued a statement reiterating that its policy of "zero-tolerance" applied to federal immigration facilities. In oral statements made by the U.S. delegation to the Committee Against Torture in 2006, Thomas Monheim with the U.S. Department of Justice responded to queries by Nora Sveaass about the implementation of PREA in immigration detention facilities. Monheim asserted that the Department of Homeland Security had taken steps to implement PREA, including the development of a classification system to segregate violent and non-violent offenders, "widespread posting of instructions on how to report sexual misconduct", and PREA training for detention officers in the facilities.

=== Juvenile facilities ===
NPREC held hearings focusing specifically on the elimination of juvenile prison rape victims on June 1, 2006. Individual states have sought to comply with the mandates of PREA concerning juveniles, for instance, the Massachusetts Department of Youth Services worked with consultants from The Moss Group, Inc. to develop PREA policies and training.

== Research and studies ==
=== Annual reports ===
In December 2007 United States Department of Justice published its 2006 report about rapes and sexual violence in American prisons. The report, which included information obtained from about 1.3 million prisoners, reported 60,500 cases of sexual violence ranging from unwanted touching to rape in 2006. In total, 4.5 percent of American prisoners reported an incident of sexual violence in the study.

=== Congressional findings ===
The U.S. Congress, within the text of PREA, conservatively estimated that at least 13 percent of the inmates in the United States have been sexually assaulted in prison. Under this estimate, nearly 200,000 inmates now incarcerated have been or will be the victims of prison rape. The total number of inmates who have been sexually assaulted between the years of 1986 and 2006 likely exceeds 1,000,000." These numbers were derived based on the "testimony of social scientists and penologists".

=== Contracted research ===
PREA mandated that the National Institute of Justice (NIJ) provide funding for research conducted by private contractors who are considered experts within the field. In 2006 alone, NIJ funded three major studies of sexual assault in prison.

One study by Mark Fleisher at Case Western Reserve University, initially released in January 2006 before being finalized or peer reviewed, showed that prison rape was rarer than estimated. Fleisher's study reported that most prisoners who claim to have been raped are looking for money, publicity, a transfer, or lying. The study was immediately questioned and disputed by members of NPREC. Both Reggie B. Walton, NPREC chair, and commissioner Cindy Struckman-Johnson spoke out against the study, with Struckman-Johnson calling it unscientific. Fleisher released a substantially revised version of the report in November 2006, and Stop Prisoner Rape (now Just Detention International) stated it was "still plagued by many of the same fundamental flaws as the initial version."

== Reaction ==
The speed with which the bill passed, and the fact it was passed without public pressure, has been called "surprising". PREA went through both houses in July 2003, was presented to the president on September 2, 2003 and signed two days later. Human Rights Watch urged President Bush to sign the bill, and stated that if it were implemented correctly it would "catalyze nationwide efforts to eliminate prison rape by inmates and correctional staff."

Robert Weisberg, co-writing with David Mills, argued in Slate in October 2003 that PREA did little more than collect data. They argued that the bill's original title, the "Prison Rape Reduction Act", was probably a more likely predictor of its outcome. A similar position was put forth by Mike Farrell, writing in The Huffington Post, where he stated, "the National Prison Rape Elimination Commission meets periodically to 'study the impact of prisoner rape.' While they study, rape continues."

In addition, Dean Spade has written about PREA in relation to prison abolition. He noted that the Act has been used to enforce imprisonment and lengthen sentences, and has been more clearly successful in reinforcing incarceration than in reducing sexual violence.

== See also ==
- Farmer v. Brennan
- Prison rape in the United States
- Sexual abuse of women in American prisons
