= Brenda V. Smith =

Legal academic and advocate

- Occupation: Professor of Law

Academic background
- Education: Spelman College (B.A., 1980); Georgetown University Law Center (J.D., 1984)

Academic work
- Discipline: Legal scholar
- Main interests: Prisoners' rights, criminal law, civil rights, constitutional law, housing law

Brenda V. Smith is a law professor at American University's Washington College of Law. She served on the National Prison Rape Elimination Commission.

== Early life and education ==
She graduated magna cum laude from Spelman College in 1980 and from Georgetown University Law Center in 1984.

== Career ==
She is the co-director of the Community and Economic Development Law Clinic. Smith is also the Project Director for the United States Department of Justice, National Institute of Corrections Cooperative Agreement for the Project on Addressing Prison Rape. From 2004 to 2009 she served on the National Prison Rape Elimination Commission. Smith was appointed to the Prison Rape commission by current House Speaker Nancy Pelosi. In 1993, Smith was awarded the Kellogg National Leadership Fellowship and, in 1998, inducted into the D.C. Women's Hall of Fame for her work on behalf of low-income women and children.

Smith's writing focuses on the intersections of gender, crime and sexuality. She received the Emmalee C. Godsey Research Award for her scholarship. Her publications include Battering, Forgiveness and Redemption; Rethinking Prison Sex: Self -Expression and Safety, Symposium on Sexuality and the Law; Sexual Abuse of Women in Prison: A Modern Corollary of Slavery; Uncomfortable Places, Close Spaces: Theorizing Female Correctional Officers' Sexual Interactions with Men and Boys in Custody; and Boys, Rape and Masculinity, Reclaiming Male Narrative of Sexual Violence in Custody.
