= V-coding =

Causing rape of trans prisoners for social control

In the context of incarceration in the United States, V-coding is the practice by carceral staff of subjecting trans women to sexual assault by placing the woman in the same prison cell as an aggressive male inmate in order to placate the male inmate. This practice has been known to have caused the daily rapes of multiple trans women, and the sexual assaults of 58.5% of them. V-coding is done to pacify the male inmate, with the goal of reducing their propensity for violence against other inmates, according to prison authorities and one inmate. The term has also been used to refer to the broader systemic sexual abuse of trans women in male prisons.

== Context ==
In 2025, more than 2,000 trans women were incarcerated in federal jails in the US. A 2007 study of Californian prisons found that 59% of trans inmates were sexually assaulted while incarcerated compared to 4% of all surveyed inmates; and 41–50% of the trans inmates surveyed reported rape, compared to 2–3% of the all inmates surveyed. Trans inmates described sexual assault as a "fact of prison life" while incarcerated. Trans inmates also reported more assaults had taken place outside of their cells compared to the cisgender inmates. Furthermore, trans inmates were disproportionately denied medical attention following a sexual assault compared to other inmates. A 2022 study in the same state found that 69% of trans women were forced into performing sexual oral practices against their will in all-male prisons—and that 58.5% of trans women reported being sexually assaulted.

It is common for correctional officers to publicly strip search trans women inmates, putting their bodies on display for staff members and other inmates. Trans women in this situation are sometimes made to dance, present, or masturbate at the correctional officers' discretion. A 2017 study by the Sylvia Rivera Law Project found that 75% of trans women respondents in New York state prisons were subjected to sexual violence by a correctional officer, with 32% being victimized by two or more COs and 27% of respondents being forced to perform oral sex for a CO.

== Description ==
A 2018 report from the Indiana Journal of Law and Social Equality, along with a previous 2012 report in the UCLA Journal of Gender and Law, found that, based on accounts of former inmates, it was common for trans women placed in men's prisons to be assigned to cells with aggressive cisgender male cellmates to maintain social control and to, as one inmate described it, "keep the violence rate down." A separate article wrote that prison authorities similarly framed this practice as "violence prevention." The two above articles also reported multiple stories that involved V-coding victims being raped daily, and found that V-coding was common enough to be considered "a central part of a trans woman's sentence."

According to the account of Kim Love found in Captive Genders: Trans Embodiment and the Prison Industrial Complex, "if you look like a female, they'll put you in a cell." Love was placed into a "shock holding cell", i.e. a high security cell, with an inmate she was told would be her "husband." This process was said to be essentially "pimping", as the prison staff would do nothing if the "wife" inmate resisted being V-coded. In addition, the prison staff would sometimes coerce the V-coded "wife" into furthering her sexual role with her "husband" by offering toiletries or medical favors—e.g. giving a "wife" gloves to be used as a condom. According to the health care worker and artist Blake Nemec, "if they defend themselves against rape or other violence that occurs with their 'husband' or cellmate, it is common for them to be charged with assault then placed in the 'hole'. The assault charge then shreds the previous parole possibility or release date."

Backing up the 2007 data on the issue, a 2021 California study found that 69% of trans women prisoners reported being made to perform sexual acts, 58.5% reported being violently sexually assaulted, and 88% reported having been "coerced into a marriage-like relationship."

== Donald Trump Presidency ==
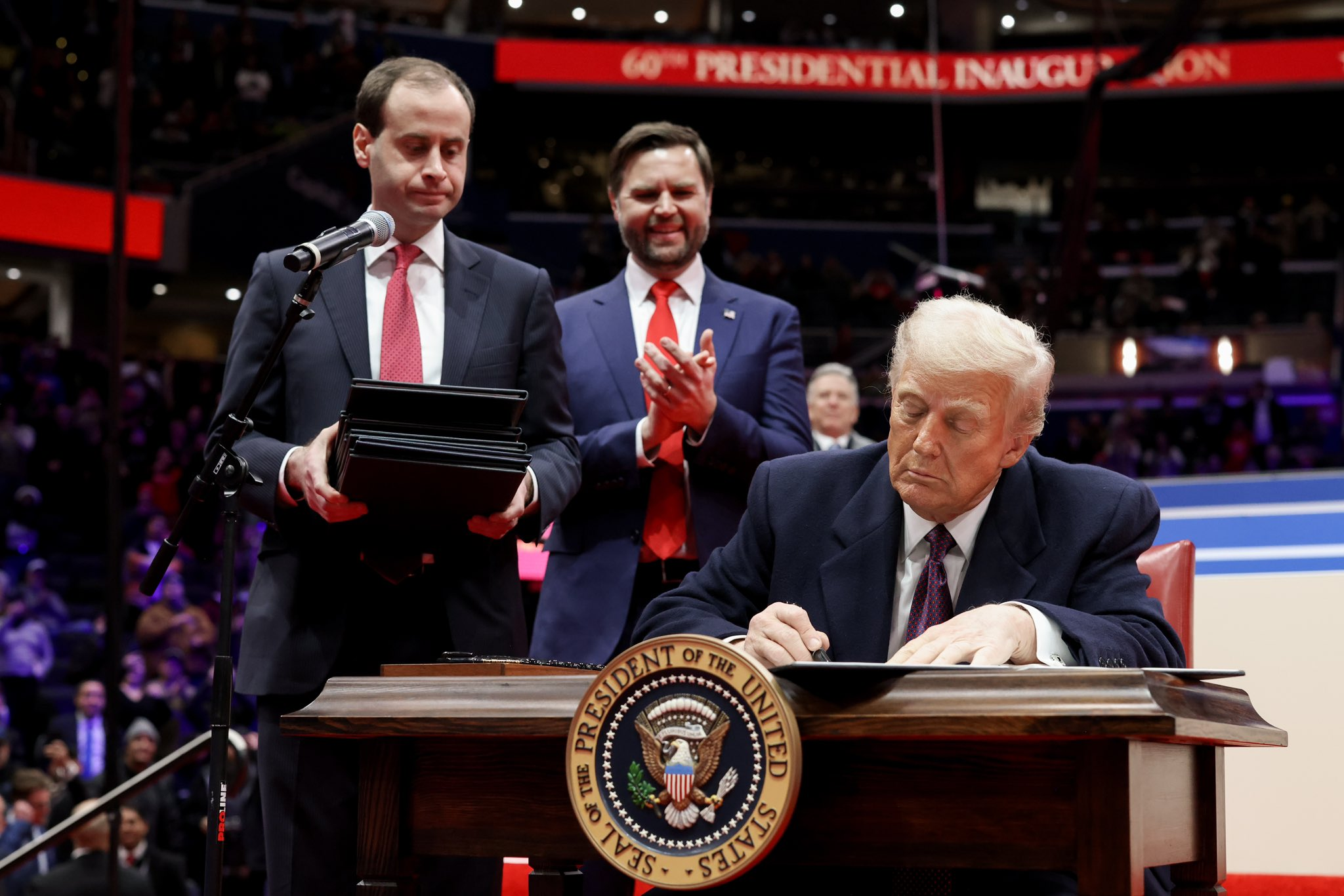
Donald Trump signing executive orders during the inauguration day, January 20, 2025.

Following Donald Trump's signing of Executive Order 14168 on the inauguration day of his second presidency—which ordered federal agencies to house trans women in men's prisons and described sex and gender as one and the same—many trans woman prisoners and several organizations issued lawsuits against the federal government, stating that such order violated the Eighth Amendment's "protection from cruel and unusual punishment" partly because of V-coding and arguing that they feared for their lives. Several judges blocked Trump's order, but federal officials relocated trans women into all-male prisons despite the rulings as these only applied to the prisoners involved in the litigation.

Some non-incarcerated trans women stated they feared being imprisoned for being trans and thus being vulnerable to V-coding since the beginning of Trump's second presidency.

== See also ==
The dictionary definition of v-coding at Wiktionary

- Corrective rape
- Prison rape
- Transmisogyny
