= Cindy Struckman-Johnson =

American psychologist

- Education: University of Kentucky
- Occupation: Social psychologist
- Known for: Commissioner, National Prison Rape Elimination Commission

Cindy Struckman-Johnson is a professor of psychology at the University of South Dakota in Vermillion, South Dakota. She was also a commissioner on the National Prison Rape Elimination Commission.

== Education ==
Struckman-Johnson received her doctorate in social psychology from the University of Kentucky.

== Career ==
Struckman-Johnson has taught social psychology, sex roles, sexuality, and prejudice classes for nearly 25 years. Struckman-Johnson and her partner, David Struckman-Johnson, have researched sexual coercion in prison since 1994. She has received two national awards for work in this area. A 1996 study by Struckman-Johnson concluded that between 12 and 14 percent of the male inmate population are "forcibly penetrated." Her 1996 study also noted that around 22 percent of inmates had been coerced into sexual contact of some kind. Furthermore, her study noted that about 18 percent of attacks are perpetrated by prison guards. Another study, undertaken by Struckman-Johnson in 2000, pointed to prison rape rates of 20 and 21 percent in seven Midwestern prisons.

== Prison rape commission ==
In 2003, she was appointed to the National Prison Rape Elimination Commission by former U.S. Senator Tom Daschle (D-SD). Her primary role on the commission was as an expert in prison rape research. The commission was sunsetted in 2009.
