= Jamie Fellner =

American lawyer

Jamie Fellner is senior counsel for the United States Program of Human Rights Watch. The U.S. Program focuses on human rights violations within the United States. From 2004-09, she also served on the U.S. National Prison Rape Elimination Commission.

== Education ==
Jamie Fellner obtained a bachelor's degree from Smith College and went on to obtain her Juris Doctor from Boalt Hall at the University of California-Berkeley. Fellner also completed doctoral work at Stanford University in Latin American history. She also can speak Spanish.

== Media appearances ==
Fellner's work has been widely reported on by the mass media and she has been a guest on numerous television programs. She has appeared as a guest on ABC Evening News, The Today Show, Hardball, Crossfire, The O'Reilly Factor, All Things Considered, Hannity and Colmes, and BBC News.

== Writings ==
Fellner also wrote articles for different newspapers& such as:

- Lethal Injections Ill-Conceived, With Painful Results
- Pain and Punishment for Persons with Mental Disabilities Behind Bars in the USA
- Power Failure: NYC Judges Penalize The Poor
- "US Right to Curb Harsh Drug Sentences", Human Rights Watch
- "A Drug Abuse Policy That Fails Everyone", The Huffington Post
- US: A Nation Behind Bars, Human Rights Watch, 2014
- Decent Decision, Huffington Post.
- About mentally ill prisoners. December 2015.
- About mistreatment of inmates,
- US civil Liberties after September 11.
