= Corrections =

Terms related to conviction(s) of crime

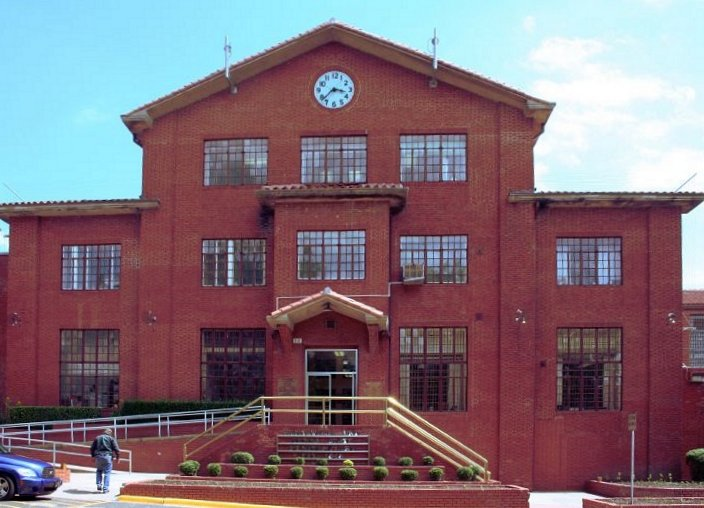
The Huntsville Unit of the Texas Department of Criminal Justice in Huntsville, Texas, is a prison, a component of a correctional system.

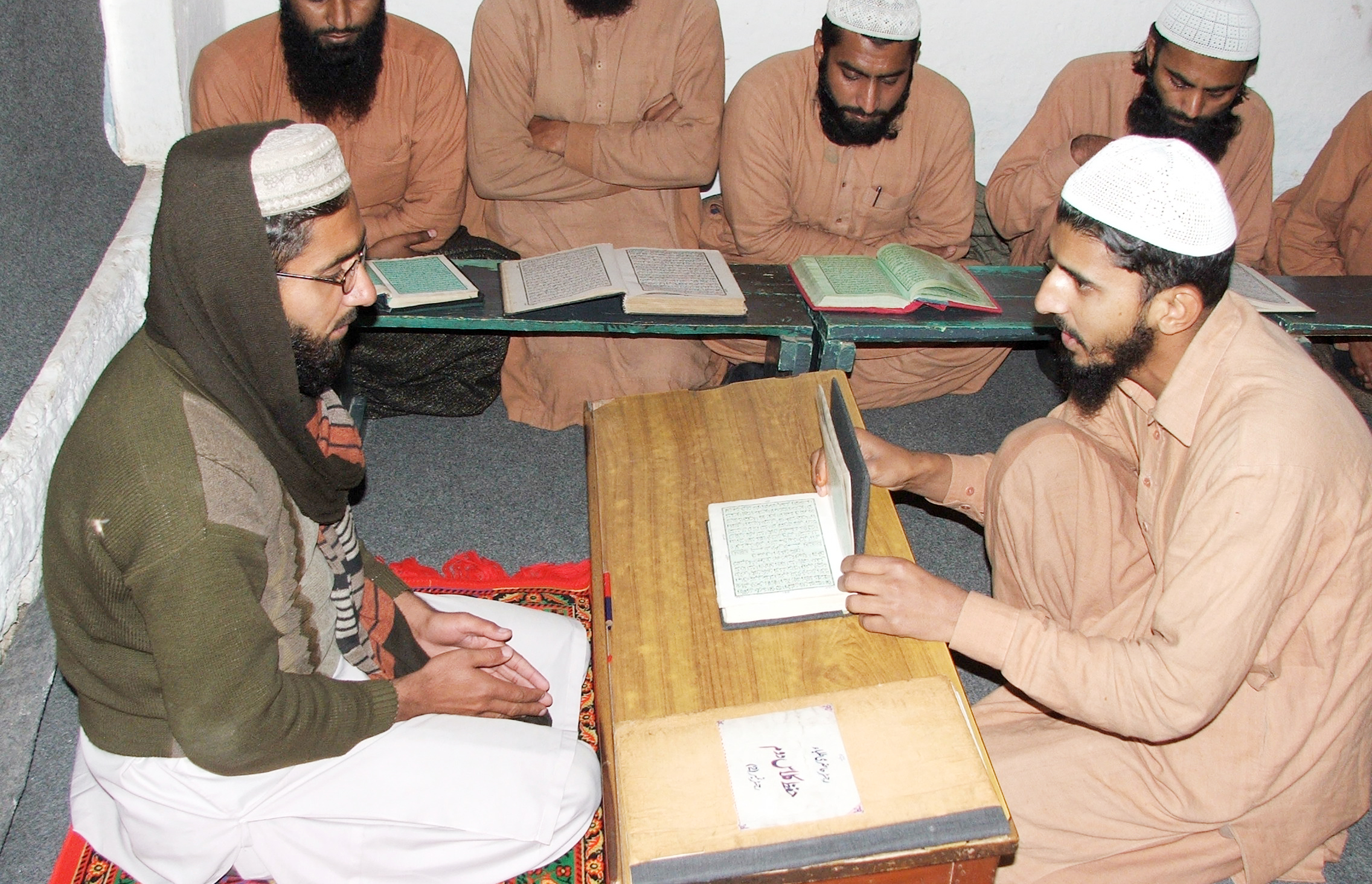
Qur'anic education for offenders at the Central Jail Faisalabad in Faisalabad, Pakistan

In criminal justice, particularly in North America, correction, corrections, and correctional, are umbrella terms describing a variety of functions typically carried out by government agencies, and involving the punishment, treatment, and supervision of persons who have been convicted of crimes. These functions commonly include imprisonment, parole, and probation. A typical correctional institution is a prison. A correctional system, also known as a penal system, thus refers to a network of agencies that administer a jurisdiction's prisons, and community-based programs like parole, and probation boards. This system is part of the larger criminal justice system, which additionally includes police, prosecution and courts.

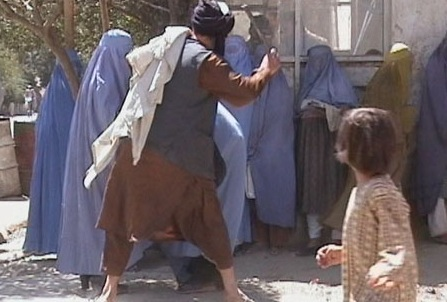
Corporal punishment in Afghanistan during the days of the Taliban

"Corrections" is also the name of a field of academic study concerned with the theories, policies, and programs pertaining to the practice of corrections. Its object of study includes personnel training and management as well as the experiences of those on the other side of the fence — the unwilling subjects of the correctional process. Stohr and colleagues (2008) write that "Earlier scholars were more honest, calling what we now call corrections by the name penology, which means the study of punishment for crime."

== Terminology ==
The idea of "corrective labor" (Russian: исправительные работы) in Soviet Russia dates back as far as December 1917. From 1929 the USSR started using the terminology "corrective-labor camps" (Russian: исправительно-трудовые лагеря (ИТЛ)) and "corrective labor colonies" (Russian: исправительно-трудовые колонии (ИТК)).

The terminology change in US academia from "penology" to "corrections" occurred in the 1950s and 1960s which was driven by a new philosophy emphasizing rehabilitation. It was accompanied by concrete changes in some prisons, like giving more privileges to inmates, and attempting to instill a more communal atmosphere. At least nominally, most prisons became "correctional institutions", and guards became "correctional officers". Although the corrections-related terminology continued thereafter in US correctional practice, the philosophical view on offenders' treatment took an opposite turn in the 1980s, when academics labeled the "get tough" program as "The New Penology".

== Community Based Corrections ==
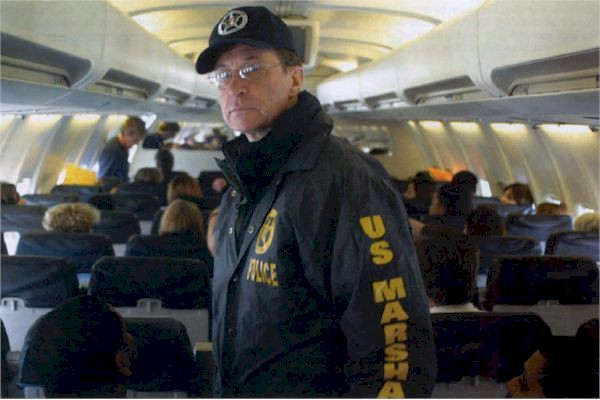
US Marshals and prisoners on board a Con Air flight

Community Based Corrections are sanctions imposed on convicted adults or adjudicated juveniles that occur in a residential or community setting outside of jail or prison. The sanctions are enforced by agencies or courts with legal authority over the adult or juvenile offenders.

Community Based Corrections can focus on both of adults and juveniles, attempting to rehabilitate them back into the community. In contrary to the "tough on crime" mindset which expresses harsh punishment, this community based correctional method seeks to transition offenders back into the community.

== Sentences ==
In Canada, until 1972, the Criminal Code legislated that courts could impose a form of whipping on male offenders, to be administered on up to three occasions, but did not limit the number of strokes. Whipping of female offenders was not allowed. The whipping could be inflicted using a strap, cat-o'-nine-tails, or a paddle unless specified by the court. The move to abolish corporal punishment in the Canadian penal system coincided with several reforms and a change from the Reform Institutions label to Corrections or Correctional.

Intermediate sanctions may include sentences to a halfway house or community service program, home confinement, and electronic monitoring. Additional sanctions may be financial and may include fines, forfeiture, and restitution; these are sometimes applied in combination.

== Theories ==
The use of sanctions, which can be either positive (rewarding) or negative (punishment) is the basis of all criminal theory, along with the main goals of social control, and deterrence of deviant behavior.

Many facilities operating in the United States adhere to particular correctional theories. Although often heavily modified, these theories determine the nature of the facilities' design and security operations. The two primary theories used today are the more traditional Remote Supervision and the more contemporary direct supervision model. In the Remote Supervision Model, officers observe the inmate population from remote positions, e.g., towers or secure desk areas. The Direct Supervision Model positions prison officers within the inmate population, creating a more pronounced presence.

== See also ==
- American Correctional Association
- Death penalty
- Deterrence
- Individual rights
- National Commission on Correctional Health Care
- National Institute of Corrections
- National Law Enforcement and Corrections Technology Center
- National Prison Rape Elimination Commission
- Social control
- United States Bureau of Justice Statistics

=== Juvenile corrections ===
- Juvenile court
- Juvenile delinquency
- Juvenile Justice and Delinquency Prevention Act
- Office of Juvenile Justice and Delinquency Prevention
