= James E. Aiken =

Consultant and expert witness

- Born: 1941 (age 84–85)
- Occupations: President of James E. Aiken & Associates, Inc.

James E. Aiken (born 1941) is a consultant and expert witness and the president of James E. Aiken & Associates, Inc.

== Career ==
Aiken serves as a consultant to attorneys and as an expert witness in civil and death penalty cases. He has served as an expert witness on prison conditions and future inmate dangerousness at U.S. Federal Courts in multiple jurisdictions. During the trial of 9/11 co-conspirator Zacarias Moussaoui he testified in an expert capacity about what Moussaoui could expect in Federal supermax prison. From 2004–2009 Aiken served as a commissioner on the National Prison Rape Elimination Commission.
