= Just Detention International =

American non-profit organization

- Formation: 1980
- Founder: Russell D. Smith
- Type: Non-governmental organization
- Legal status: 501(c)(3) nonprofit
- Purpose: Ending sexual abuse in detention
- Headquarters: Los Angeles, California, U.S.
- Region served: United States; South Africa
- Budget: $3.049 million (2023)
- Website: justdetention.org

Just Detention International (JDI) is an American human rights organization dedicated to ending prison rape. As of 2011, JDI was the only NGO exclusively devoted to combatting the sexual abuse of prisoners. JDI is based in Los Angeles.

== History ==
JDI grew out of People Organized to Stop Rape of Imprisoned Persons (POSRIP), founded in 1980 by Russell D. Smith, a survivor of prison rape. The organization's name was eventually changed to Stop Prisoner Rape (SPR). Smith was succeeded by Stephen Donaldson. Donaldson, a fellow survivor and longtime gay rights activist, incorporated SPR as a legal entity (in 1994), expanded its media presence, and coordinated the amicus curiae brief it filed in Farmer v. Brennan (1994), the first Supreme Court decision to address the issue of sexual assault in prisons. In his capacity as the president of SPR, Donaldson also testified on behalf of the American Civil Liberties Union in Reno v. American Civil Liberties Union (1996), the first Supreme Court decision to address issues of free speech and indecency on the internet. Donaldson ran the organization out of his apartment in Manhattan. After Donaldson, SPR was led by Don Collins and Tom Cahill, also prison sexual assault survivors. In 2001 SPR opened its first permanent office and hired Lara Stemple, an attorney with a human rights background, as executive director.

SPR played a key role in the passage of the Prison Rape Elimination Act of 2003 and similar state-level legislation. At different times T.J. Parsell and David Kaiser headed its board of directors. Andrea Marra has also served on its board. In 2008 the organization changed its name to Just Detention International. JDI began working in South Africa in 2004 (after being approached by a group of corrections officers at Pollsmoor Prison) and formally opened a South African branch in 2013.

== Activities ==
In addition to lobbying for new legislation, JDI has sought to educate correctional administrators about sexual violence in prisons, change public opinion on the issue, and provide resources to prisoners and ex-prisoners.

== Budget and funding ==
JDI's reported revenue for 2023 was $3.049 million.

== Bibliography ==
- Jenness, Valerie; Smyth, Michael (July 2011). "The Passage and Implementation of the Prison Rape Elimination Act: Legal Endogeneity and the Uncertain Road from Symbolic Law to Instrumental Effects". Stanford Law and Policy Review. 22 (2).
- Singer, Michael (2013). Prison Rape: An American Institution?. Bloomsbury Publishing.
