= National Prison Rape Elimination Commission =

U.S. bipartisan panel

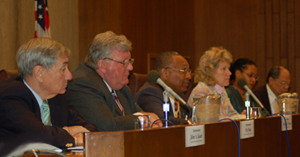
NPREC commissioners during a public hearing.

The National Prison Rape Elimination Commission (NPREC) was a U.S. bipartisan panel established by the 2003 Prison Rape Elimination Act. The commission was charged with studying sexual assaults in U.S. jails and prisons and presenting a report based on its findings.

The report was released in June 2009 and stated that approximately 60,000 U.S. inmates are sexually assaulted each year. NPREC sunsetted on August 22, 2009.

== Mission ==
The NPREC was charged with studying federal, state and local government policies and practices concerning sexual assaults and crimes within the prison and jail systems. The study culminated with the release of the aforementioned report on its findings, conclusions and recommendations to the President, Congress, the U.S. Attorney General and other state and federal officials.

== History ==
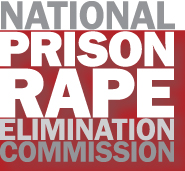
Logo of the NPREC in 2009

The National Prison Rape Elimination Commission (NPREC) was established when President George W. Bush signed the Prison Rape Elimination Act of 2003 (PREA) on September 4 of that year. The commissioners were appointed in June 2004. The commission was a major component of the PREA legislation and it was given subpoena powers as well as authorization to conduct a broad based study of prison rape in the United States. In 2005 the commission received a federal earmark of US$987,000 to begin the implementation of the mandated provisions of the 2003 law that established the panel.

The panel obtained information from a variety of sources, including a round of public hearings in locations nationwide. The first public hearing was held in Notre Dame, Indiana on March 31, 2005. Hearings continued into at least late 2007 in other locations, including Boston, New Orleans, and San Francisco, where commissioners heard from victims of prison rape as well as federal lawmakers.

After seeking outside input from aforementioned sources and others the commission announced the release of "draft standards for the reduction of prison rape" on May 5, 2008. Following a public comment period the standards were eventually incorporated into the final report.

The panel's original period of existence was until three years after its inception, when it would release its report. The miscellaneous provisions the Second Chance Act of 2007, largely a law designed to help reintegrate criminal offenders into the community, extended the existence of the NPREC from 3 years to 5 years after its inception date. Per the legislation that established the commission NPREC sunsetted sixty days after the report was released, which was August 22, 2009.

== Members ==
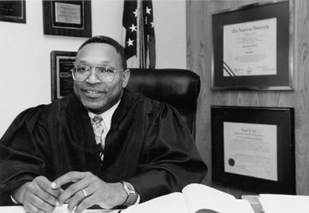
Reggie B. Walton, chairman of NPREC

Upon its creation the panel consisted of nine members, three presidential appointees and six Congressional appointees. The official NPREC web site listed eight commissioners, including a chairman and a vice-chair.

The chairman was Judge Reggie B. Walton of the Washington D.C. United States District Court. The vice-chair was John A. Kaneb; the other six members were: James E. Aiken, Jamie Fellner, Pat Nolan, Gus Puryear, Brenda V. Smith, and Cindy Struckman-Johnson.

== Report and recommendations ==
In late June 2009 NPREC released its mandated report. The report cited data that showed each year in the U.S. detention facilities (jails, prisons, et al.) 60,000 inmates are sexually abused. The report noted that too often prison rape is seen as a joke rather than the problem it represents. NPREC Commissioner Brenda V. Smith stated that sexual abuse in prison or jail is not a random event that can only "happen to other bad people", she added that the commission heard harrowing tales from victims, some of whom spent only one night in custody.

The report set out a series of recommendations aimed at curbing the number of rapes in U.S. incarceration facilities. Among the recommendations were better staff training in recognizing assaults, addressing overcrowding, and providing proper mental health care and medical care for victims. In addition NPREC recommended that harsher penalties exist for staff who engage in assault or contribute to a permissive atmosphere.

There were other findings presented in the report as well. NPREC found that inmates who are short, gay, young, or female were victims of sexual assault more often than other groups of inmates. The NPREC report also showed that inmate reports of sexual violence are not always taken seriously by staff and, thus, not always reported to the proper authorities.

The report's finding that 2.9 percent of inmates reported sexual abuse by staff versus 2.0 percent of inmates who reported rape by other prisoners was called surprising by commission chair Reggie Walton. Walton was specifically surprised by the incidence of male staff on male inmate sexual assault.

Following its release, the report was sent to U.S. Attorney General Eric Holder. Holder has one year to develop national standards, based on NPREC's report, for reducing prisoner rape. The national standards will then be presented to the states. States are not required to comply with the standards but those that do not risk a five percent federal prison funding decrease.

== Implementation of PREA Standards ==
Since the release of the National Prison Rape Elimination Commission's (NPREC) report in 2009, the implementation of the Prison Rape Elimination Act (PREA) standards has been an ongoing process. The Department of Justice published the final rule adopting national standards to prevent, detect, and respond to prison rape in May 2012. These standards apply to all confinement facilities, including jails, police lockups, and juvenile facilities.

Despite the establishment of these standards, the implementation has faced several challenges. Critics have noted that the process has been slow, and many states have struggled to fully comply with the standards. As of 2016, 40 states had not yet complied with PREA standards, resulting in financial penalties. Additionally, some lawmakers have attempted to weaken the provisions of PREA, further complicating the implementation efforts.

However, the PREA standards have also led to significant changes in the corrections culture. They have raised awareness about the issue of prison rape and have provided a framework for facilities to improve their policies and practices. Ongoing efforts by organizations like the PREA Resource Center continue to support the implementation and enforcement of these standards.

== See also ==
- Prison rape in the United States
- No Escape: Male Rape in U.S. Prisons
