= National Institute of Corrections =

U.S. government agency

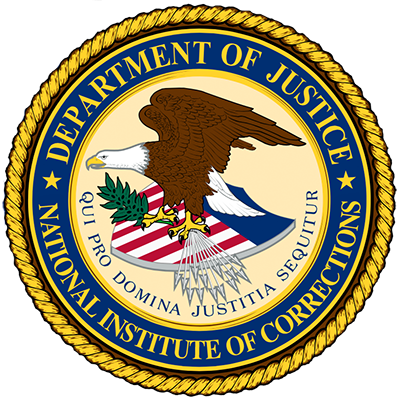
- Seal of the National Institute of Corrections

Agency overview
- Formed: 1974
- Agency executives: Stefan LoBuglio, Director; Robert Brown, Jr., Senior Deputy Director; Holly Busby, Deputy Director
- Parent agency: Department of Justice
- Website: nicic.gov

The National Institute of Corrections (NIC) is an agency of the United States government. It is part of the Federal Bureau of Prisons.

== History ==
The NIC was created by the United States Congress in 1974, based on the recommendation of the National Conference on Corrections convened by Attorney General John N. Mitchell in 1971. Mitchell called for the conference as a result of public pressure following Attica Prison riot in September 1971.

== Scope ==
The NIC provides training, technical assistance, information services, and policy/program development assistance to federal, state, and local corrections agencies. Additionally, the NIC provides funds to support programs that are in line with its key initiatives.

== See also ==
- Incarceration in the United States
