= Prison rape =

Forced sexual intercourse in prison

Prison rape or jail rape is sexual assault of people while they are incarcerated. The phrase is commonly used to describe rape of inmates by other inmates. It is a significant, if not controversial, part of what is studied under the wider concept of prison sexuality.

== United States ==
In the United States, the overwhelming majority of prison rape cases involve men who are raped by other men. This is due in part to the fact that in the United States the vast majority of incarcerated people are men. Sexual contact with inmates by prison staff is illegal, regardless of supposed consent.

Public awareness of common prison rape is a relatively recent development, and estimates of its prevalence have varied widely over the past several decades. In 1974, Carl Weiss and David James Friar wrote that 46 million Americans would one day be incarcerated; of that number, they held that 10 million would be raped.

According to a US Department of Justice report from 2013, an estimated 5.0% of people incarcerated in state and federal prison, and 3.2% of those in jail, reported at least one incident of sexual victimization in the prior 12 months. However, advocates dispute the accuracy of the numbers due to under-reporting of sexual assaults in prison, especially among incarcerated youths.

In terms of individuals' risk over their entire incarceration, estimates from the 1980s and 1990s range widely. A 1992 estimate from the Federal Bureau of Prisons suggested that between 9% and 20% of inmates had been sexually assaulted. Similarly, studies from 1982 and 1996, concluded that the rate was somewhere between 12% and 14%. In New York State maximum security prisons, a 1986 study put the proportion at around 23%. By contrast, Christine Saum's 1994 survey of 101 inmates determined that 5 had been sexually assaulted.

The Prison Rape Elimination Act of 2003 was the first United States federal law passed specifically dealing with the sexual assault of prisoners. The bill was signed into law on 4 September 2003.

== Middle East ==
Rape is regularly used in prisons across the wider Middle East. Sexual abuse of detained women, children and men is rampant in UAE, Saudi and Bahraini prisons.

=== Iran ===
Sexual violence against political prisoners is prevalent in Iran. Smuggled letters written by imprisoned political activists in 2011 alleged that the practice was even facilitated by prison authorities, who provided condoms to other inmates to encourage them to rape activists.

Reports issued to the United Nations allege that rape has been used by interrogators in Iran for decades. During the 1980s, following the Iranian Islamic Revolution, the rape of female political prisoners was so prevalent that it prompted Hussein-Ali Montazeri, Supreme Leader Ayatollah Khomeini's then-deputy, to write the following to Khomeini in a letter dated 7 October 1986: "Did you know that young women are raped in some of the prisons of the Islamic Republic?" Two prominent members of Iran's human rights community, the feminist lawyer and journalist Shadi Sadr and the blogger and activist Mojtaba Saminejad published essays online from inside Iran saying prison rape has a long history in Iran.

In the 2009 Iranian presidential election protests, opposition groups reported thousands were arrested and tortured in prisons around the country, with former inmates alleging mass rape of men, women and children by the Islamic Revolutionary Guards, in prisons such as Kahrizak and Evin.

Following the 2009 presidential election, Iranian presidential candidate Mehdi Karroubi said several protesters held behind bars in Evin Prison had been savagely raped, according to a confidential letter to former president and cleric Akbar Hashemi Rafsanjani. Karroubi said this was a "fragment" of the evidence he had and that if the denials did not stop, he would release even more.

On 9 August 2009, in a letter to the Chairman of the Expediency Discernment Council of Iran, Mehdi Karroubi demanded investigation of Iranian prisons for possible torture and, in particular, sexual harassment of men and women. On 19 August, he wrote to parliament speaker Ali Larijani, asking to meet with him, President Mahmoud Ahmadinejad, judiciary chief Ayatollah Sadiq Larijani, former president Akbar Hashemi Rafsanjani and the state prosecutor to "personally present my documents and evidence over the cases of sexual abuse in some prisons specially Kahrizak." Ali Larijani and Sadiq Larijani (Judiciary committee) both officially rejected his claims and Ali Khamenei's representatives, and Vice Chairman of National Security Commission of the parliament demanded Karroubi's arrest.

=== Turkey ===
Human Rights Watch and Amnesty International have both released reports of widespread rape and abuse of prisoners in Turkey spanning multiple decades. Kurdish prisoners have also been specifically targeted for rape and other forms of sexual violence.

== China ==
In February 2021, BBC News reported eyewitness accounts of systematic rape of Uyghur women in the Xinjiang re-education camps.

Multiple women who were formerly detained in the Xinjiang re-education camps have publicly made accusations of systemic sexual abuse, including rape. Sayragul Sauytbay, a teacher who was forced to work in the camps, told the BBC that employees of the camp in which she was detained conducted rapes en masse, saying that camp guards "picked the girls and young women they wanted and took them away". She also told the BBC of an organized gang rape, in which a woman around age 21 was forced to make a confession in front of a crowd of 100 other women detained in the camps, before being raped by multiple policemen in front of the assembled crowd. Tursunay Ziawudun, a woman who was detained in the camps for a period of nine months, told the BBC that women were removed from their cells "every night" to be raped by Chinese men, and that she was subjected to three separate instances of gang rape while detained. Qelbinur Sedik, an Uzbek woman from Xinjiang, has stated that Chinese police sexually abused detainees during electric shock tortures, saying that "there were four kinds of electric shock... the chair, the glove, the helmet, and anal rape with a stick".

== England and Wales ==
According to a 2023 report in The Observer, there were almost 1,000 rapes in prisons in England and Wales between 2010 and 2023.

== See also ==
- Sexual assault of LGBT people in prison
- Sexual assault of women in prison
- Teardrop tattoo
- T. J. Parsell
