= Gold digger =

Type of romantic relationship in which a person engages for wealth rather than love

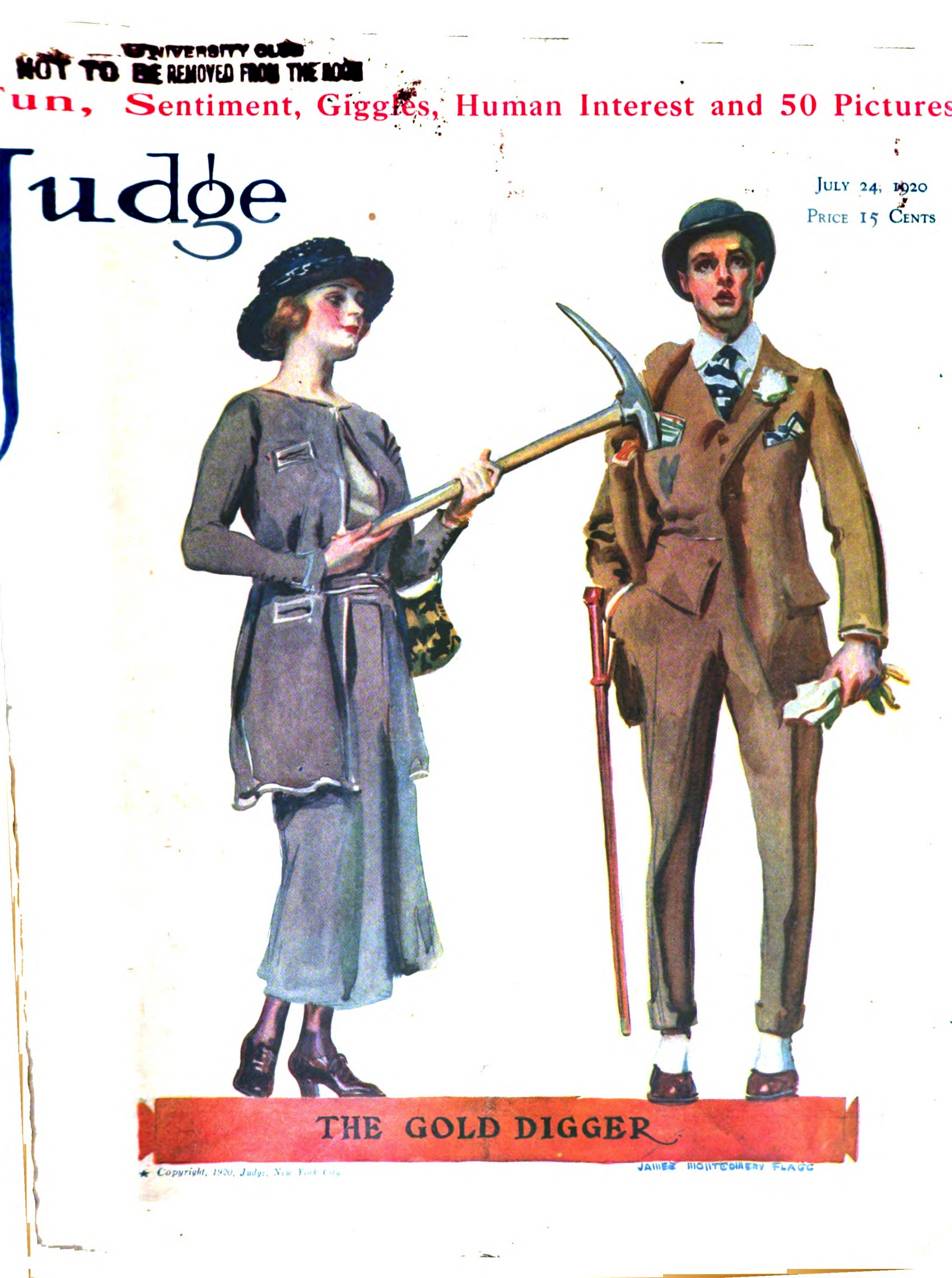
The Gold Digger (Judge, 24 July 1920)

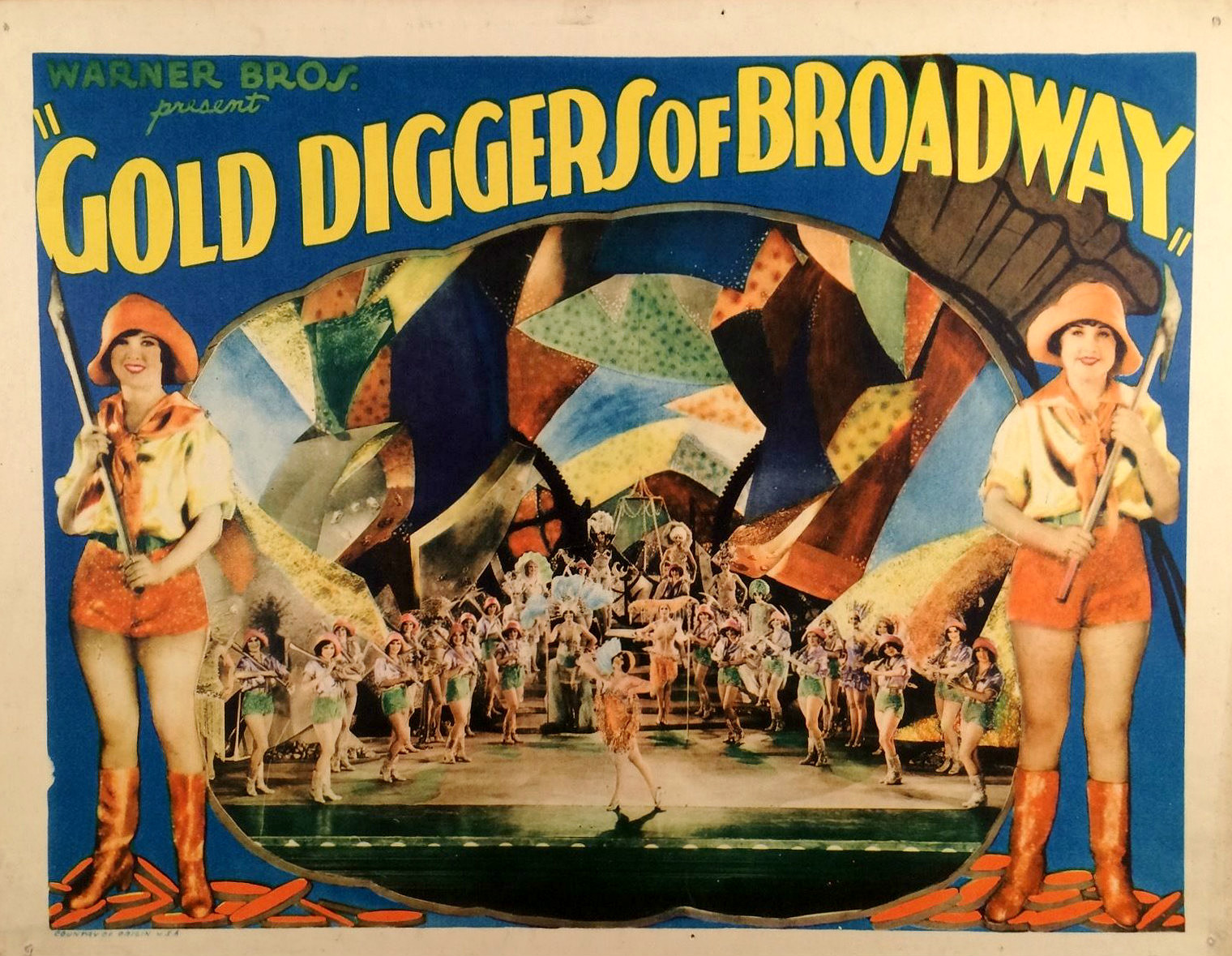
Lobby card for Gold Diggers of Broadway (1929), an example of a film which helped create the American public association of chorus girls with gold diggers

A gold digger is a person who engages in a type of transactional sexual relationship for money and social status rather than love. If it turns into marriage, it is a type of marriage of convenience.

== Etymology and usage ==
The term "gold digger" is a slang term that has its roots among chorus girls and sex workers in the early 20th century. In print, the term can be found in Rex Beach's 1911 book, The Ne'er-Do-Well, and in the 1915 memoir My Battles with Vice by Virginia Brooks. The Oxford Dictionary and Random House's Dictionary of Historical Slang state the term is distinct for women because they were much more likely to need to marry a wealthy man in order to achieve or maintain a level of socioeconomic status.

The term rose in usage after the popularity of Avery Hopwood's play The Gold Diggers in 1919. Hopwood first heard the term in a conversation with Ziegfeld performer Kay Laurell. As an indication on how new the slang term was, Broadway producers urged him to change the title because they feared that the audience would think that the play was about mining and the Gold Rush.

== Society and culture ==
=== General ===
There exist several cases where female public figures have been perceived as exemplars of the gold digger stereotype. The best-known gold digger of the early 20th century was Peggy Hopkins Joyce. Joyce was a former show girl who married and divorced millionaires. She was characterized as a "gold digger" during her divorce battle with Stanley Joyce during the early 1920s. Some have argued that she was the real-life inspiration for Lorelei Lee, the protagonist in Anita Loos’ 1925 novel Gentlemen Prefer Blondes which holds gold digging as a central theme. Additionally, some have contended that the term "gold digger" was coined to describe her. Former Olympian Eleanor Holm was dubbed the "swimming gold digger" for her divorce contest with Broadway impresario Billy Rose during the 1950s. The press and public described model/actress Anna Nicole Smith as a gold digger for marrying multi-millionaire octogenarian J. Howard Marshall II. There was even a book published as a Little Blue Book (Little Blue Book No. 1392, Confessions of a Gold Digger, by Betty Van Deventer, 1929).

=== Law ===
The recurring image of the gold digger in Western popular media throughout the 1920s and 1930s developed into an important symbol of a moral panic surrounding frivolous lawsuits. Sharon Thompson's research has demonstrated how public perception of the prevalence of gold digging has created disadvantages for female spouses without their own source of income in the negotiation of alimony cases and prenuptial agreements. The gold digger stereotype triggered public discussions about heartbalm legislation during the 1930s, particularly breach of promise cases. Public outrage surrounding the image of frivolous lawsuits and unfair alimony payouts related to the gold digger archetype contributed to a nationwide push throughout the middle and late 1930s to outlaw heart balm legislation in the United States.

== Popular culture ==
=== Film ===
The gold digger emerged as a dominant trope in American popular culture beginning in the 1920s. Stephen Sharot stated that the gold digger supplanted the popularity of the vamp in 1920s cinema.

By the 1930s, the term "gold digger" had reached the United Kingdom through a British remake of The Gold Diggers. While the film received negative critical reception, several sequels with the same title have been produced.

In the 1930s, the gold digger trope was used in a number of popular American films, most notably Gold Diggers of 1933, Gold Diggers of 1935, Baby Face, Red-Headed Woman, Dinner at Eight, and Havana Widows. Film historian Roger Dooley notes that the gold digger is one of the most common of the “stock company of stereotypes that continually reappear in the films of the 1930s.” Gold diggers in 1930s cinema were often portrayed in positive, sometimes heroic, ways. The character has featured in many films since the 1930s such as Gentlemen Prefer Blondes (1953) and How to Marry a Millionaire (1953), both starring Marilyn Monroe, or as a villainous foil, as in both versions of Disney's film The Parent Trap.

=== Music ===
The gold digger image or trope appears in several popular songs, including "My Heart Belongs to Daddy" (1938), "Diamonds Are a Girl’s Best Friend" (1949), "Santa Baby" (1953), "She Got the Goldmine (I Got The Shaft)" (1982), and "Material Girl" (1984). Rap music's use of the "gold digger script" is one of a few prevalent sexual scripts that is directed at young African-American women. The 2005 hit "Gold Digger" by Kanye West was the ninth best selling and ninth most played song of the 2000s, according to People Magazine.

== Related terms ==
The term sugar baby is a related term for a young woman who engages in transactional romantic relationships, and arose during the 1920s, not long after the popularization of gold digger. A distinction between the two might be made in that gold digger has the connotation of a woman whose goal is marriage to a wealthy husband, whereas sugar baby implies the status of girlfriend or mistress of a wealthy man.

== See also ==
- Age disparity in sexual relationships
- Hypergamy
- MRS degree
- Prostitution
- Separate property systems
- Social stigma
- Transactional sex
- Treating (dating)
- Trophy wife
