= Censorship in Malaysia =

Censorship is a long term issue in Malaysia which has become more apparent as it attempts to adapt to a modern knowledge-based economy. Despite having in its Federal Constitution that subject to certain conditions, "every citizen has the right to freedom of speech and expression" (Article 10), Malaysia has consistently sat low on global indexes related to press and media freedom.

In 2016, Malaysia was ranked 146th (out of 180) in the Worldwide Press Freedom Index by Reporters Without Borders. It was also given a "Partly Free" status on the Freedom in the World report by Freedom House in 2008 and remains so in 2016. On the Freedom in the World index, graded on a scale of one to seven, with one being the most free and seven being the least, Malaysia obtained four points for both political rights and civil liberties.

Unlicensed use or possession of a printing press is illegal under the Printing Presses and Publications Act of 1984. Journalists are frequently given guidelines by the Prime Minister's Office when reporting 'sensitive' issues, and media self-censorship is encouraged.

== Background ==
Ex-Malaysian Home Minister Datuk Seri Syed Hamid Albar said in 2003 that the guidelines surrounding censorship, which were drawn up in 1993, would be restudied because some of the rules "were no longer applicable". He reiterated that the main objective of the code was to build a better "Bangsa Malaysia". On the current film censorship guidelines, he said that if a scene was "too sexy", then the scene would be axed. "It's up to the Board. They watch the scene and if it's too glaring then they will cut it. If it's not pornographic in nature, then they will allow it. It is very subjective." He also said, "Today's standard of morality and spirituality must be strong because people are exposed to all sorts of challenges" and "There is a correlation between criminal offenders and sex and violence shown on screen."

After the negative reactions towards the censoring of an article concerning the 2011 Bersih 2.0 rally, in mid-August 2011, Prime Minister Datuk Seri Najib Tun Razak stated that media censorship "is no longer effective" and that the government will review its current censorship laws.

Despite this promise, the Malaysian government again censored reports by the BBC and Al Jazeera on the 2012 Bersih 3.0 rally. Both organisations sent very strongly worded complaints to Astro Malaysia, the broadcasting company delivering the news, about the doctoring of their news reports. The complaints were dismissed with Astro saying that the news agencies "did not take cognizance of the duty of Astro to comply with local content regulations". The Minister of Culture and Information, Rais Yatim, went on record to say that "only the best parts of the report" were shown. There were also reports of the police seizing and destroying cameras and attacking journalists who attempted to take photos of what appeared to be police brutality.

== Censorship policies ==
=== Nudity ===
Books, magazines and prints containing nudity (including nudity of aboriginal peoples) or government sensitive material are censored manually by shading areas in black ink. Some books are censored by removing entire pages.

Pornography of any kind is strictly banned in Malaysia. Sex and nude scenes are strictly disallowed by the censors.

=== Individual words ===
Under subsection 48(3) and (4) of the Penang Islamic Religious Administration Enactment 2004, the Selangor Non-Islamic Religions (Control of Propagation Among Muslims) Enactment 1988 and other state laws, non-Muslims in Peninsular Malaysia are penalised for using the following words, or to write or publish them, in any form, version or translation in any language or for use in any publicity material in any medium: "Allah", "Firman Allah", "Ulama", "Hadith", "Ibadah", "Kaabah", "Qadhi'", "Illahi", "Wahyu", "Mubaligh", "Syariah", "Qiblat", "Haji", "Mufti", "Rasul", "Iman", "Dakwah", "Wali", "Fatwa", "Imam", "Nabi", "Sheikh", "Khutbah", "Tabligh", "Akhirat", "Azan", "Al Quran", "As Sunnah", "Auliya'", "Karamah", "Syahadah", "Baitullah", "Musolla", "Zakat Fitrah", "Hajjah", "Taqwa" and "Soleh".

The use of individual words in publications by non-Muslims has been the subject to lengthy legal battles, including in Archbishop of Kuala Lumpur v Menteri Dalam Negeri, where the Federal Court of Malaysia overruled a High Court decision that the use of "Allah" by non-Muslims was a constitutional right. However, in the High Court case of Jill Ireland v Menteri Dalam Negeri (2021), a 1986 Federal ban under the Printing Presses and Publications Act 1984 of a similar set of prohibited words in Christian publications was overturned as "irrational and perverse", "unconstitutional" and outside of the statutory powers conferred in the Act. The court distinguished the two decisions, arguing that Archbishop of Kuala Lumpur dealt with the constitutional right to use the word "Allah", rather than the legality of the directive itself banning Christian publications from using the word. In 2023, the Malaysian government withdrew its appeal of the 2021 High Court decision. The State Government of Selangor maintains that the decision in Jill Ireland does not affect its state enactment.

=== Israel ===
Any Hebrew and Yiddish-language movies and movies from Israel are not allowed to be shown in Malaysian cinemas.

== Internet ==
Up till 11 June 2011 and beginning July 2014, Internet content was officially uncensored, and civil liberties assured, though on numerous occasions the government has been accused of filtering politically sensitive sites. Any act that curbs internet freedom is theoretically contrary to the Multimedia Act signed by the government of Malaysia in the 1990s. However, pervasive state controls on traditional media spill over to the Internet at times, leading to self-censorship and reports that the state investigates and harasses bloggers and cyber-dissidents.

As of 28 January 2014 many political sites have been blocked by the Malaysian government. Internet users will encounter a blue and black box with "This website is not available in Malaysia as it violates the National law" announcement. When users try to resolve the IP address of those domain, they will get back an IP address provided by TM [175.139.142.25]

The OpenNet Initiative found no evidence of Internet filtering in Malaysia in the political, social, conflict/security, and Internet tools areas in May 2007. and is on the Reporters Without Borders 2011 list of countries under surveillance.

Prime Ministers Abdullah Badawi and Najib Razak, on many occasions, have pledged that Internet access in Malaysia will not be censored and that it is up to parents to install their own censorship software and provide education to their children (provide self-censorship). The ISPs also actively deny that there are Internet filters in place when asked. However, the Communications Minister has occasionally announced that they are working on a nationwide filter, but each time such an announcement is made the Prime Minister makes a rebuttal to emphasise that there will be no Internet censorship. The state ministries of Terengganu and Kelantan have also announced that they have statewide filters in place in their respective states.

In 2006, Deputy Science and Technology Minister Kong Cho Ha announced that all Malaysian news blogs will have to be registered with the Ministry of Information. He justified this by stating the law was necessary to dissuade bloggers from promoting disorder in Malaysia's multi-ethnic society.

In April 2011, Prime Minister Najib Razak repeated promises that Malaysia will never censor the Internet. In 2016, the blogging platform Medium was blocked in Malaysia, after an investigative blog it hosted, Sarawak Report, covered allegations of corruption against Najib.

In February 2012, Malaysian authorities deported a Saudi journalist accused of insulting the Islamic prophet, Muhammad in a tweet.

In May 2013, leading up to the 13th Malaysian general election, there were reports of access to YouTube videos critical of the Barisan National government and to pages of Pakatan Rakyat political leaders in Facebook being blocked. Analysis of the network traffic showed that ISPs were scanning the headers and actively blocking requests for the videos and Facebook pages.

In July 2018, the Malaysian police announced the creation of the Malaysian Internet Crime Against Children Investigation Unit (Micac) that is equipped with real-time mass internet surveillance software developed in the United States and is tasked with the monitoring of all Malaysian internet users, with a focus on pornography and child pornography. The system creates a "data library" of users which includes details such as IP addresses, websites, locations, duration and frequency of use and files uploaded and downloaded.

In March 2020, routes to IP addresses belonging to the CDN provider for Pornhub and XVideos were blocked by Telekom Malaysia. Users were initially able to circumvent the block using an alternative DNS service provider, but these IPs were eventually blocked a few days later.

On 15 February 2021, online dating platform Sugarbook was blocked. Malaysian authorities claimed that the online dating platform violates Section 233 of the Multimedia and Communications Act 1998 for improper use of network facilities or network service. Malaysian Communications and Multimedia Commission (MCMC) has not confirmed the banning of Sugarbook, but the authority announced that they are investigating Sugarbook and several other applications that provide online dating services.

== Print and publishing ==
All newspapers need an official permit to print, which must be renewed annually until the annual licensing requirement was scrapped in a 2012 amendment to the law. The licensing system allows the government to close media outlets at will and often encourages publishers to toe the line.

In 2006 alone, 56 publications were banned by the Internal Security Ministry, including the Indonesian translation of Charles Darwin's On the Origin of Species.

Malaysia once banned the release of the Bible in Iban language. The translation of the word "God", i.e. "Allah Ta'ala" was deemed to be specifically for Muslim use. The ban has since been lifted.

In August 2008, the Sisters in Islam (SIS), an Islamic organisation in Malaysia, was surprised to find that a book published in 2005 featuring a compilation of research papers was banned by the Home Ministry of Malaysia. SIS research and publications programme manager Masjaliza Hamzah said that activists and academics from Southeast Asia and the Middle East contributed to the book in 2003 and that it mainly focused on challenges Muslim women faced in their countries. A statement from SIS described the book: "It discussed strategies...used to curb extremism and promote women’s rights".

On 27 October 1987, Operation Lalang was carried out. In this operation, two daily newspapers, The Star and Sin Chew Daily, and two weekly newspapers, The Sunday Star and Watan, were closed down for several months. They also had their publishing permits suspended temporarily. Prior to the operation, The Star was the primary English newspaper that provided news in the opposition's point of view. This was considered treason, and during Operation Lalang, this newspaper was shut down. Most of the staff working for the four newspapers were laid off or otherwise threatened with prison and detainment, under the Internal Security Act.

In 2003, Abdullah Ahmad, the former editor-in-chief of the New Straits Times, wrote an article criticising Saudi Arabian policies that aided the United States invasion of Iraq among other things. As a result, the Saudi government reduced the Malaysian quota for haj and in the same year Abdullah "was fired without warning by the daily’s management at the request of the ruling UMNO party following a complaint by the Saudi ambassador in Malaysia." UMNO, which holds a stake in the paper, later stated that he had jeopardised Malaysia's close relationship with Saudi Arabia.

In June 2010, Suara Keadilan's publication was not renewed because it published a report which claimed that a government agency was bankrupt. Suara Keadilan is run by opposition leader Anwar Ibrahim's Keadilan party. The Home Ministry, which overseas Malaysia's newspapers, said it was not satisfied with the paper's explanation for the allegedly inaccurate report.

In July 2011, parts of The Economist's article about the 2011 Bersih 2.0 rally were found to be censored by the Home Ministry on claims that the censored parts were "incorrect and misleading". The move was later slammed by politicians, who called it an outdated move in a maturing society. MCA vice-president Senator Gan Ping Sieu even recommended a better approach of rebutting the claims with facts and "lodging a complaint against the publisher" and that the censoring of the printed article which is also available online would only stir public curiosity and "would only result in more people learning about the article, thus defeating the ministry's purpose of censoring it in the first place."

In January 2012, eagle-eyed readers of the AFP website found that the local tabloid The Star had removed the mention of Malaysia from an article sourced from the AFP. This discovery was posted to the 1 Malaysia Don't Want SKMM Block File Sharing Website page where many of the members criticised The Star for their action. Malaysia was removed from a mention of countries that practice internet censorship, reaffirming the readers that the country is indeed practising internet censorship and is trying to hide the truth from the readers of the tabloid.

In January 2014, the image of pigs were censored in the Malaysian edition of International New York Times, which was partnered with The Malaysian Reserve in the country.

In March 2014, the Malay-language version of the comic book Ultraman the Ultra Power was banned in by Home Ministry, due to it referring to God as Allah, raising the ire of Malaysian netizens.

Silverfish Books in Kuala Lumpur has reported on the censorship of foreign books in Malaysia. They have discovered the censorship of Czech author Milan Kundera, the banning of works by Khalil Gibran, Chinua Achebe, and Iris Chang, and the restriction of books by Rushdie and many others. They also managed to get a list of some of the restricted books from one of their distributors. The list includes literary fiction (e.g. work from Salman Rushdie, Irvine Welsh, Anthony Burgess, New Village Zine, Rebecca Wells), a fantasy novel by Robert Jordan and children's books (e.g. SpongeBob SquarePants and Dora the Explorer titles).

Among the academic titles banned for "disrupting peace and harmony" in 2006 were Mona Johulan's The Bargaining for Israel: In the Shadow of Armageddon, Mathew S Gordon's Islam, Trudie Crawford, Lifting the Veil, Bobby S Sayyid's A Fundamental Fear of Eurocentrism and the Emergence of Islamism and Christine Mallouhi's Mini Skirts Mothers & Muslims. In 2014, the Home Ministry banned the novels "Perempuan Nan Bercinta" by Faisal Tehrani (for promoting Shiism), Alan Hollinghurst's The Line of Beauty (for promoting homosexuality), Jacob Appel's "The Man Who Wouldn't Stand Up" (for criticising Mohammed) and three other works of fiction.

Censored comics include It's a Good Life, If You Don't Weaken, Ultraman the Ultra Power and The Best of Drawn & Quarterly. Censorship of nonfiction varies; it includes academic works such as: Mao: A Life and Making Globalization Work, as well as a host of books dealing with human bodies and/or sexuality, such as The Vagina Monologues, Breastfeeding Your Baby: Revised Edition and How to Talk to Your Child About Sex.

== Journalism ==
On 1 May 2012, the BBC strongly condemned Astro for tampering with their content on the BBC World News programme which was broadcast on 28 April 2012, the day when a rally which demanded electoral reform named "Bersih 3.0" was held in Kuala Lumpur. According to the video posted on YouTube, some short interviews with two demonstrators were removed from the news clip. On top of that, a scene which showed the riot police firing tear gas and chemical-laced water at the protestors was also censored. On the next day, Astro admitted to censoring the BBC's Bersih 3.0 coverage but expressed their disappointment with the world-renowned news agency for failing to understand their intention to "comply with local rules". Meanwhile, Al-Jazeera asked for an explanation from the local satellite television operator to clarify reports it had censored their coverage of the same Bersih rally.

== Music ==
Malaysia has a history of music censorship. In radios they will censor lyrics with coarse language. Rastafarian reggae is often censored, as it refers to "Zion".

=== Music concerts ===
In 2003, American rock band Linkin Park was told to refrain from wearing shorts while performing and in 2004, singer Mariah Carey was asked to cover up. Madonna has been banned from Malaysian television and a scheduled concert by Norwegian metal band Mayhem was banned earlier in 2006. Malaysian organizers of a Pussycat Dolls concert were fined for flouting decency laws.

The country's opposition party, the Pan-Malaysian Islamic Party, urged the government to order the cancellation of a concert on 29 August 2008 by Canadian rock singer Avril Lavigne. Her onstage moves were considered too provocative for Malaysia's teenage population. Eventually the concert went on as scheduled; it sold over 10,000 tickets and was a critical success in Malaysia. After the event, the government lifted some bans, allowing musicians to perform in Malaysia to boost tourism.

In September 2009, the Malaysian government agreed to let Muslims attend a concert by US hip-hop stars The Black Eyed Peas, reversing an earlier ban imposed because the show was sponsored by an alcoholic beverage company. The government did not give further details on the U-turn, which had caused an outcry in the Muslim-majority nation. The protest reflects growing conflicts between moderate and conservative Muslims, including many occupying positions of power in the government and judiciary, in a country that has long been considered a moderate society in the Islamic world.

Shows by Gwen Stefani and Beyoncé Knowles (two concerts were cancelled in 2007 and 2009, respectively) have also faced protests by conservative Muslims over immodest clothing, forcing the artists to don attire that revealed little skin. Moderate Muslims, Chinese, Indians and other non-Muslims criticised conservative Muslims, calling them "narrow-minded" in the wake of these events.

In July 2010, the Wonder Girls were allowed to return to Malaysia for MTV World Stage Live in Malaysia, along with Katy Perry, despite her songs and clothing being too "sexy" for the Malaysian teenagers. In October the same year, Adam Lambert scheduled concert in Malaysia was given the green light amid moderate protests from fundamental Muslims over controversies pertaining to his sexuality.

In February 2012, an Erykah Badu concert was cancelled because it was found that she had applied a temporary tattoo of the word Allah on a part of her body.

In October 2013, a Kesha concert was cancelled at the 11th hour which has brought so much anger to the Malaysians. Although Kesha has tried to fit the rules set by the authorities but they still warned her that she will be imprisoned if she disobey the rules.

In July 2023, a The 1975 concert was cancelled during Good Vibes Festival in Kuala Lumpur and got banned from performing in Malaysia. During the festival, Matty Healy, the frontman of the band kissed their bassist, Ross McDonald in an act to protest against the country's anti-LGBTQ+ policies. He later made a speech, "I made a mistake. When we were booking shows, I wasn’t looking into it. I don't see the fucking point of inviting The 1975 to a country and then telling us who we can have sex with."

=== Songs ===
Any songs whether from local or foreign singers, may be censored if the song contains explicit lyrics or sexual references. For example, in 1989, the nation's public broadcaster, Radio Televisyen Malaysia, bans 71 songs by local artists in just three months alone. RTM also no longer plays or airs the song Despacito from their TV and radio stations in 2017 due for sexually charged lyrics. However, privately owned radio stations and online streaming services are still allowed to play and host the song.

Most song censoring were done by local radio stations such as Astro Radio's Hitz and Mix with stricter form of censorship and Malaysian feed of MTV Asia were delayed by 1 hour for censorship purpose. In addition, singles released to Malaysian radio stations may be different from the version released in the album due to censorship purpose.

== Film and cinema ==
Film censorship in imposed in Malaysia and the Film Censorship Board of Malaysia is the government ministry that vets films and is also the government agency responsible for granting licenses to the films for commercial viewing. It is under the control of the Home Ministry.

The two main cinema operators in Malaysia, Golden Screen Cinemas and Tanjung Golden Village, are known to be strict in ensuring that only patrons aged 18 and above are allowed to view films rated "18". Although movies shown in Malaysian cinemas carry an age-restricted rating such as "18", films that contain scenes of sex and nudity are completely censored off by the Film Censorship Board of Malaysia, which renders the 18 rating meaningless and strict entry by the cinema operators pointless. Kissing and make-out scenes are also censored in movies rated "P13" but in recent years the Board has loosened the censorship. On the other hand, there have been many "18" rated films filled with profanity and graphic violence that were hardly censored or uncensored in recent years. This shows that the board mostly views sex and nudity as completely unacceptable for a Malaysian audience.

Malaysia's film censorship guidelines were further tightened in 2003 amid rising Islamic conservatism: In addition to nudity and sex scenes being strictly censored off, kissing scenes and cleavages were also censored and many movies were banned altogether. Many movies have been banned for high impact violence and/or cruelty, which is also not allowed by Malaysia's film censorship guidelines. Censorship guidelines for local movie productions were only slightly eased in March 2010 to allow LGBT characters who could only portray their sexual orientation through hugging the same sex. No kissing was allowed between two men or two women.

Censorship guidelines for films were loosened in March 2010, the first revision since 1994, allowing movies with violence and profanity to be screened in local cinemas, some without cuts, such as Night at the Museum: Secret of the Tomb, Zookeeper, Life of Pi and We Bought a Zoo. Minimal cuts are applied to some films, including Divergent, The Host, The Mortal Instruments: City of Bones, The Maze Runner and The Fault in Our Stars.

In billboards for the 2016 film The Monkey King 2, the billboards promoting the movie removed all images of Zhu Bajie, a part human and part pig character who was one of the main characters of the movie and the story it was based on.

== Television ==
Ownership of satellite receivers other than those provided by Astro is illegal without a license (which in itself is difficult and prohibitively expensive to obtain). Owners of such receivers without a license can face confiscation of equipment as well as a hefty fine if discovered. This is enforced through tip-offs, and owners can be found out quite easily, as many of these receivers rely on dishes that are significantly bigger than those provided by Astro.

In other aspects, kissing onscreen on local television networks, whether free-to-air or pay television is prohibited, as are homosexuality, sex scenes/nudity and strong graphic violence. As well, strong language is also censored, whether on both free-to-air or pay television. For a short time in the early 2000s, images of pigs on terrestrial TV were also censored, although images of pigs are now apparently allowed, and there was no such censorship on satellite/cable TV. Although contractually, satellite networks cannot be censored in the country, Astro has censored news footage that is critical of the ruling government. It is the network's duty to ensure that the feed provided to cable and satellite providers in the country is free of all banned content. Therefore, the Malaysian feed of most channels is often the one meant for conservative areas, i.e. Cambodia and Indonesia.

In August 1994, private channel TV3 and public broadcaster, RTM were given a prerogative by the Information Minister, Mohamed Rahmat to ban appearances of khunsa (intersex people) and "cross-dressing men" (pondan) from appearing in any of their programmes; the minister had alleged their appearances were "influenced by bad culture practiced by the Western communities". In 1995, Saban's Mighty Morphin Power Rangers was taken off the air because of the similarities of the word "Morphin" (a short form for "Metamorphorsizing"), to the drug Morphine.

On 6 April 2012, Information Communications and Culture Minister Rais Yatim said in a Twitter post that there is no censorship regarding the portrayal of LGBT characters on state-owned TV channels, including the portrayal of effeminate men; however the ministry has the right of select content suitable for the Malaysian public.

When the Eurovision Song Contest Asia 2026 was broadcast on TV3 in Malaysia, scenes with the Philippine drag queen and presenter Vice Ganda were edited out due to complying with local regulations. TV3 also censored the opening number by replacing close-up scenes with Thai drag performers on street foot carts with wide shots taken from rehearsals. Eurovision's organisers have said they are "surprised and disappointed" that the first Eurovision Asia was altered when it was broadcast in Malaysia, and they'll take this matter seriously and will be writing to Voxovation, the producers of the show, to seek clarification and ask them to establish with Malaysian broadcaster TV3 why this happened. Eurovision's organisers also clarified that the censorship appears to be isolated to the Malaysian broadcast of the show, and all other transmissions were not altered. Voxovation said in a statement that it was aware of the concerns raised and was looking into the matter with the broadcaster to establish the circumstances, and they're working with the Malaysian broadcaster to make sure this doesn’t happen again.

=== Television shows ===
- Malcolm in the Middle has been banned outright because it depicts violent and sexual content for school-aged children along with offensive depictions of sexual anti-social behaviour.
- Supernanny UK has been banned outright because it has disgusting behaviour, heavy realistic violence, very coarse language and nudity for children. The U.S. version of the television program is also banned.
- Home and Away has been banned outright because it has heavy violence, sexual content, strong adult themes, cruelty and horror beyond 2011.
- From 1989, Neighbours has been banned because it depicts vulgar and sexual content along with offensive depictions of sexual behaviour. It was lifted by the end of 1994, as it became available on satellite network Astro.
- Sydney-based news bulletins shown on both Australian advertisement networks Seven and Nine were banned because they had heavy violence, language and nudity.

Among the titles that were blacklisted include:

- "A Wedding" episode on Glee
- "The Queen Bee" episode on Ally McBeal
- "The One with the Video Tape" and "The One Who Says "But I'm A Cheerleader"", two Friends episodes
- South Park is banned outright because it has excessive vulgar content, sexual content and offensive, high impact violence, but is now available on Comedy Central Asia through HyppTV.
- Family Guy has been banned outright because it depicts vulgar and sexual content along with offensive depictions of sexual behaviour. It was unbanned in 2010 due to the availability of FOX Asia through Astro, but remains heavily censored. The TV series, however, can still be watched on the national airline Malaysia Airlines' inflight entertainment.

== See also ==
- Malaysia Internet Blackout Day (2012)
- Human rights in Malaysia
- List of books banned in Malaysia
