= Seduction (tort) =

Obsolete common law civil wrong

The tort of seduction was a civil wrong or tort in common law legal systems, and still exists in some jurisdictions.

Originally, it allowed an unmarried woman's father – or other person employing her services – to sue for the loss of these services, when she became pregnant and could no longer perform them. Over time, the tort was altered, so that instead, it would be used by an unmarried woman to sue on the grounds of seduction to obtain damages from her seducer, if her consent to sex was based upon his misrepresentation.

Breach of promise was a similar, but not identical, tort that was used frequently in similar situations in the past, but has now been abolished in most jurisdictions.

== Legal basis ==
Initially, the tort of seduction was a remedy for a father's property interest in his daughter's chastity. However, the damages to which the father would be entitled were based on the father's loss of the working services of a daughter, much as a master could sue if a third-party caused injury to his servant that rendered the servant unable to work, because she was "seduced and debauched" and became pregnant as a result of nonmarital sexual activity. The tort of seduction was one of the most common civil actions toward the end of the 19th century, and fathers were often successful before juries.

In the 20th century, the action was criticised as maintaining "property interests in humans", and the tort was recast to recognize personal injury to the woman, rather than solely deprivation of a father's property right. Most jurisdictions granted the victim (the wronged woman) the right to sue in her own name. (Fathers could still sue as well, on the ground that they had a moral interest in their daughters' chastity). The suing woman was "usually but not always a virgin".

== England ==
Historically, the seduced female could not bring a suit herself. Rather, it would usually be brought by her father, acting under the legal fiction that the parent-child relationship falls under the master-servant relationship. However, if the daughter was a contracted servant, a suit could not be brought by her father against her master. English courts did not require the father to bring the suit: any person who had suffered a loss of the woman's services could bring a claim, and successful claimants included widowed mothers and aunts. Generally, seductions had to result in pregnancy in order to be actionable, although exceptions did exist. Although damages were nominally awarded for the financial loss to the claimant, by the 19th century they tended to reflect more the social embarrassment and stigma associated with pregnancy out of wedlock that was suffered by the claimant.

The tort was abolished in England & Wales in 1971, under section 5 of the Law Reform (Miscellaneous Provisions) Act 1970.

== Canada ==
Property and civil rights is a provincial power in Canada, so all torts can vary by province. Many Canadian judges highly disliked the tort, and sought to interpret it as narrowly as possible, citing concerns that the tort could be used for extortion, vindictiveness and the encouragement of immorality. Most provinces abolished it due to incompatibility with the Canadian Charter of Rights and Freedoms, although successful actions by the latter half of the 20th century were increasingly rare anyway.

=== Alberta ===
As described below, the Northwest Territories enacted seduction laws in 1903, when Alberta was still part of the Territories. When it became a separate province in 1905, it retained this law. The 1934 John Brownlee sex scandal revolved around a seduction suit. The law was repealed in 1985 by the Charter Omnibus Act, S.A. 1985, c. 15, since the law was considered contrary to section 15 of the Canadian Charter of Rights and Freedoms which precludes discrimination.

=== British Columbia ===
The action was abolished by the Family Law Reform Amendments Act 1985, c72.

=== Manitoba ===
In 1892, Manitoba adopted anti-seduction laws, copying and citing in part the Ontario legislation. It abolished these laws in 1982, under the Equality of Status Act, alongside all other heartbalm actions.

=== New Brunswick ===
New Brunswick repealed seduction laws in 1985, since they were incompatible with section 15 of the Canadian Charter of Rights and Freedoms, which precludes discrimination.

=== North West Territories ===
In 1903, the Northwest Territories adopted anti-seduction laws. At this time, Alberta and Saskatchewan were both part of the North West Territories, and retained this law even after becoming separate provinces in 1905. Similar to Prince Edward Island's 1852 statute, this notably allowed for a seduced woman to sue for herself with this tort, for personal hurt and injury (as opposed to much of the previous law, targeted at compensating a father). The law was abolished in 1985, due to incompatibility with section 15 of the Canadian Charter of Rights and Freedoms, which precludes discrimination.

=== Ontario ===
An Act to make the remedy for cases of seduction more effectual, and to tender the fathers of illegitimate children liable for their support, was passed in Upper Canada on March 4, 1837. Amending traditional common law, it allowed fathers to sue their daughters' masters for the tort of seduction. It also held biological fathers liable for children conceived out of wedlock.

The Seduction Act was repealed in 1978 by the Family Law Reform Act.

=== Saskatchewan ===
As described above, the Northwest Territories enacted seduction laws in 1903, when Saskatchewan was still part of the Territories. When it became a separate province in 1905, it retained this law. The province repealed its seduction law in 1990: becoming the last province to do so.

=== Prince Edward Island ===
An 1852 statute in Prince Edward Island notably allowed for a seduced woman to sue for herself with this tort, for personal hurt and injury (as opposed to much of the previous law, targeted at compensating a father), although damages were capped at 100 pounds. However, two years later, in McInnis v McCallum, the court held that a woman could only sue for damages herself if she could show that at the time of the seduction, she also had had a parent, master or guardian entitled to sue under the common law action, for loss of her services.

== United States ==
The common law for a cause of action for seduction in the United States developed from the same principles and in much the same manner as it developed in Canada. In fact, the courts in each country would rely on decisions from the other in reaching judgments. Statutory frameworks also followed similar trajectories in both countries.

There were “three great periods of legislative reform in the field of heart balm actions” in the United States. These periods generally encompassed (1) the late 19th and early 20th centuries, when seduction statutes were enacted, (2) the 1930s, when eleven states repealed or dramatically circumscribed the availability heart-balm statutes including seduction, and (3) the 1970s to 1980s, when eleven more states took action to repeal or reduce the applicability of heart-balm statutes.

States have continued to remove such causes of action, with the result that there remain two states, North Carolina and South Dakota, where a cause of action for seduction currently may be brought.

=== California ===
When the Code of Civil Procedure (CCP) for California was enacted in 1872, it included two statutes that provided a basis for a civil suit for seduction. One allowed a woman to sue on her own behalf (CCP §374), and the other allowed the parent to sue for the wrongs a child sustained (CCP §375). The original law did not require that the woman be a minor at the time of the alleged seduction. In 1939, concurrent with the repeal of a cause of action for seduction in many states, CCP §374 was amended to limit the cause of action to a woman less than the age of majority.

A case that is illustrative of the cause of action for seduction in California is the 1890 of Jessie Norris Marshall v. Jacob Shell Taylor. Miss Marshall, a teenaged waitress, was seduced by her employer, Jacob Taylor, owner of the Casa Del Mar hotel in Del Mar, California. The trial lasted a week, and included testimony from Miss Marshall that Mr. Taylor had drugged her; further testimony from Miss Marshall of on-going relationship between she and Mr. Taylor; testimony from Jacob Taylor denying any relationship at all; and additional testimony from defense witnesses that Miss Marshall was not of chaste character.

The trial was reported on daily by the Los Angeles press, with disagreeing predictions among the papers as to which party would prevail. Public interest in the trial was extraordinary. According to the Los Angeles Times, “ ... what is really surprising is to see so many spectators whose faces and general appearance indicate that they have passed the fifth decade in life and who eagerly listen to the testimony as it drops from the lips of the witnesses, even to a degree greater than the young man about town who has just dropped in for a minute to look upon the plaintiff and defendant and to see how the case is going.”

At the trial’s end, the jury found for Miss Marshall, giving her a judgment for $25,000. In addition, Mr. Taylor and one of his witnesses were subsequently tried for perjury. Mr. Taylor appealed the judgment, but was unsuccessful. Sadly for Miss Marshall, however, Jacob Taylor had disposed of his substantial assets prior to her receiving affirmation of the judgment on appeal, and she was never able to collect a penny.

The case exemplifies the pitfalls of seduction actions for the woman bringing suit. It shows how difficult it was for a young woman to speak of private matters in a courtroom, how eagerly the public consumed the daily trial testimony, and how much power was held by the man whose character was called into question, including his ability to avoid a lawfully obtained adverse monetary judgment.

As in other states, societal changes in California rendered the cause of action for seduction unnecessary.

In 1967, a document entitled “Report of the Advisory Commission on the Status of Women: California Women” addressed a number of legal issues where women were treated differently than men, including property law, family law, the probate code, and the laws on seduction. The Commission stated the belief that Civil Procedure Codes §§374 and 375 allowing a civil action for seduction were “outmoded and useless and should be repealed.” Sections 374 and 375 of the California Code of Civil Procedure were repealed in August 1967.

=== Indiana ===
The state of Indiana was the first state in the United States to repeal heart-balm statutes.

In 1935, a first-term representative named Roberta West Nicholson introduced an anti-heart balm bill in Indiana. Mrs. Nicholson thought that women were of a better moral character and did not need heart balm statutes to protect them. She introduced the legislation to repeal the laws.

When Mrs. Nicholson was interviewed some forty years later, she was quoted in the Jasper, Indiana, Herald as stating, “I had always felt it was ridiculous for a woman to change her mind and say it was all over but a man couldn’t if he had any money.” […]. “I thought such suits were a blot on the honor of women. I was pretty young and didn’t realize at first I was challenging a basic common law, that the woman was a chattel and that the man, in marrying her, was saying, ‘I buy you and agree to feed you and clothe you.

=== New Mexico ===
In February 2026, the New Mexico Supreme Court abolished the tort of alienation of affections, overturning a 1923 decision that recognized such a claim. The decision describes “a sweeping undercurrent of social change ... [that] robs the tort of any lingering justification in the law.” One could infer from language and logic of the decision that the cause of action for seduction also has been barred.

=== North Carolina ===
North Carolina is one of only two states where a cause of action for seduction is viable. As recently as 2022, the North Carolina appellate court upheld a cause of action for seduction alleged by a young woman against a spiritual leader of the church she attended. The defendant attempted to assert that the matter was not properly before the civil court as it was an ecclesiastical question. The court held that the matter could be resolved using principles of civil law to determine whether the defendant procured a sexual relationship with plaintiff by “deception, enticement or other artifice.”

=== South Dakota ===
The state of South Dakota still has a specific statute addressing seduction: South Dakota Statute 20-9-7. Abduction, enticement and seduction forbidden by rights of personal relation. The seduction of a wife, daughter, or orphan sister, or husband, son, or orphan brother are listed as potential tort causes of action.

== See also ==
- Alienation of affections
- Kranzgeld in Germany
