= Gold digging =

Gold digging may refer to:

- Gold digger, a person, usually female, who enters a relationship purely for monetary gain
- Gold mining, the process of mining for gold ore
- Gold panning
