= Treating (dating) =

Transactional social activity

In the social context of dating, treating is the practice of providing companionship and intimate activity in exchange for entertainment outings, gifts, and other items of monetary value. The activity was prevalent in the large urban areas of the United States from the 1890s to the 1940s and was most commonly engaged in by young working class women. As treating became more widespread, the activity acquired the label "charity," and the young women who engaged in the more risqué aspects of the practice were often called charity girls.

Although some reformers in the early 20th century equated treating with prostitution, the young women who engaged in the activity strongly rejected this view and drew sharp distinctions between the two. As social dating between the sexes became more standard in the 1920s, treating began to blend with the system of dating and by the 1940s the specific language of treating had largely disappeared.

== Etymology and usage ==
The word "treating" began as a political term with the practice of "providing" understood as a means to influence people and gain benefits. In modern usage, it is generally defined as the act of providing food, drink, and entertainment to an individual or a group free of charge. The word's use as a verb in a social context is believed to have originated in the male sphere of saloons when individuals would treat each other to another round of drinks. Around the turn of the nineteenth century, young working-class women who were seeking language for their interactions and bartering with young men adopted the word. Similar to the activity in the saloon, the practice of "to treat" evolved to mean the providing of something by a man to a woman, the women being the recipient of the "treat."

== Origin ==
Treating came about with the birth of leisure time in the late nineteenth century. It emerged about the same time cheap amusements in cities gave working-class men and women opportunities to enjoy new aspects of city life away from cramped tenements and noisy, oppressive workplaces. For young women, the issue was how to afford the new entertainments, and one solution which materialized was treating.

In the late 19th century, inexpensive entertainment venues, such as public dance halls, amusement parks, and nickelodeon movie theaters, emerged and flourished in large American cities. At the same time, changing societal mores allowed more young women who previously had to be escorted in public more freedom to go out on their own or in same-sex groups. Although the cheap amusements were a major draw, going out for young working-class women still proved difficult due to their low wages, a portion of which was more often than not handed over to support the family. This lack-of-money issue was dealt with in various ways: some women refrained from going out altogether or limited going out to special occasions, while others depended on friends or their male counterparts to finance their entertainment pleasures. Inevitably, as more young women regularly went out, some found it necessary to depend on males for their entertainment and fun. As such, the practice of treating by young working-class women emerged.

== Bartered exchange ==
The practice of treating ranged from the innocent bartered exchange to the more scandalous. It was seen as a harmless activity when conducted between a “steady” couple and more risqué when performed on a casual basis. Often the treating exchange was a tacit understanding with nuanced communication. However, even with little communication, young women well understood they were indebted to a certain extent to the men who treated. Like any interaction between a couple, whether tacit or not, sometimes it went smoothly with each party pleased with the outcome; other times, it did not. Occasionally, because men were sometimes tricked by women who skipped out after being provided a meal or an evening out, the exchange was more direct, for example a man asking directly what he would get in return. Unlike prostitution, in the treating exchange there was no guarantee the man would get what he wanted.

Young women who wanted more from the exchange—clothes, shoes, jewelry, or payment of bills—often engaged in the more risqué forms of treating. This may have involved, for example, being picked up from a dance hall or other venue and offering companionship for the evening, sometimes up to and including sexual favors. The women who engaged in the more risqué activities were referred to as charity girls. Cash was very rarely used in the treating transaction; that was considered an aspect of prostitution. The young women who engaged in treating did not see themselves as prostitutes, and, in fact, drew sharp distinctions between the two, but they often walked a fine line between being treated and being paid for their intimate activity.

Treating was predominantly practiced by young working-class women. It was seldom taken up by young women of middle- or upper-class means as members of those classes generally could afford their own entertainments. The activity was largely confined to the large urban areas of the United States as cities contained the entertainment venues and offered, as well, a degree of anonymity against prying family members and watchful neighbors. Treating differed from gold digging in that it was mainly a dating practice utilized to enjoy the entertainments and pleasures of city life and to acquire, perhaps, some desired personal items. To be sure, some women took "charity" a step further, but finding a wealthy man to marry, or becoming a mistress, was generally not the goal of the treating exchange.

== Societal problem ==
As the practice of treating by young women became more widely known, it attracted the attention of reformers and vice squads who were alarmed by the activity. It was considered nothing less than outright prostitution by some. Entertainment venues, such as dance halls, where young men and women interacted came under close scrutiny. The taxi-dance halls where young women hostesses could be danced with for a modest sum per dance, usually ten cents, drew the particular ire of reformers, and some venues were shut down.

== Treating in popular culture ==
The protagonist of the Broadway musical Sweet Charity, Charity Hope Valentine, was a taxi-dancer and likely charity girl. In the show, the title character is all too "charitable" but has a heart of gold. The musical was later adapted to the movie of the same name, directed by Bob Fosse.

In Truman Capote's Breakfast at Tiffany's, the dating activities of protagonist Holly Golightly closely resemble treating. She is not employed, so to support her New York City lifestyle she has to depend on gifts and assistance from the men in her life. In a March 1968 interview with Playboy, Capote asserted that Holly was not a prostitute and instead labeled her, and other young women like her, "authentic American geishas." He noted that "if [Holly] felt like it, she might take her escort home for the night." Capote, who wrote Breakfast at Tiffany's in the late 1950s, may not have realized the behavior he ascribed to Holly was previously known as treating, as by then the earlier language used to describe the activity had largely disappeared from the American vernacular. In 1961, the novella was adapted into the film of the same name, directed by Blake Edwards and featuring Audrey Hepburn as Holly.

== See also ==
- Casual sex
- Enjo kōsai
- Girlfriend experience
- Gold digging
- Prostitution
- Protective pairing
- Sugar dating
- Transactional sex
