= Kranzgeld =

German legal concept

The obsolete German legal concept Kranzgeld (literally "wreath money") was compensation paid to a woman of "immaculate reputation" if a man broke off his engagement after having had sexual intercourse with her. This was a form of legal damages based on the premise that the woman would now have reduced marriage prospects. "Immaculate reputation" (Unbescholtenheit) in this context meant "intact sexual honour" (Unversehrtheit der Geschlechtsehre), not strictly virginity; therefore, it could also apply to widows, but was lost through consensual extramarital sex. (For example, a 1967 case was rejected because the woman had previously had sex outside marriage one time.)

The term refers to the wreath that a bride customarily wears at her wedding. Traditionally, a virgin bride was entitled to wear a wreath of myrtle flowers; a non-virgin bride, on the other hand, had to wear a wreath made of straw.

In Germany, Kranzgeld was regulated in paragraph §1300 of the family law, part of the civil code Bürgerliches Gesetzbuch published in 1896 and taking effect in 1900. Kranzgeld was abolished in East Germany in 1952, but continued to exist in West Germany, and applied throughout Germany again after German reunification.

The amount of compensation awarded to women in these cases decreased over time. Finally, Kranzgeld was repealed on 4 May 1998. This followed a 1993 trial in which a woman had sued for 1,000 DM (about USD 600 in 1993) because her ex-fiancé left her after they had had sex. The judge ruled that social norms had changed so that engaged couples having sex was no longer scandalous and a woman did not suffer reputational loss for having sex with her fiancé, and that the Kranzgeld law was therefore unconstitutional for violating the principle of gender equality.

== See also ==
- Seduction (tort)
- Breach of promise
- Heartbalm tort
