= Trophy wife =

Woman married to a man as a status symbol for her beauty

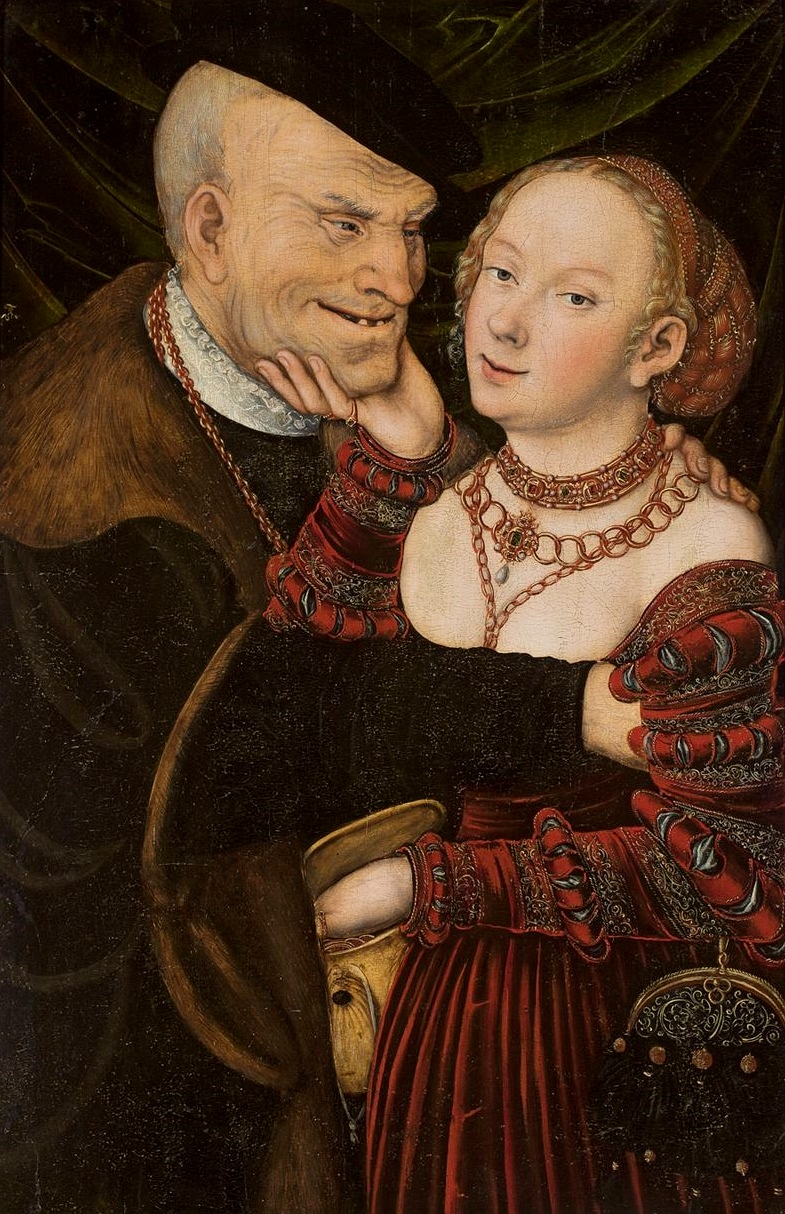
The ill-matched couple, by Lucas Cranach (c. 1550), National Museum in Warsaw

A trophy wife is a wife who is regarded as a status symbol for the husband. The term is often used in a derogatory or disparaging way, implying that the wife in question has little personal merit besides her physical attractiveness, requires substantial expense for maintaining her appearance, is often unintelligent or unsophisticated, does very little of substance beyond remaining attractive, and is in some ways synonymous with the term gold digger. A trophy wife is typically relatively young and attractive, and may be a second, third or later wife of an older, wealthier man. A trophy husband is the male equivalent.

== History ==
In his Theory of the Leisure Class (1899), Thorstein Veblen suggested that "The original reason for the seizure and appropriation of women seems to have been their usefulness as trophies." The term's more recent etymological origins are disputed. One claim is that "trophy wife" originally appeared in a 1950 issue of The Economist newspaper, referring to the historical practice of warriors capturing the most beautiful women during battle to bring home as wives. William Safire claimed that the term "trophy wife" was coined by Julie Connelly, a senior editor of Fortune magazine, in a cover story in the issue of August 28, 1989, and immediately entered common usage. Author Tom Wolfe, himself often credited with coining the term, disclaimed it in a talk given at Brown University in 1996, wherein he also credited Fortune magazine in an article published "not that long ago". Many sources claim the term was coined earlier (for example, the Online Etymology Dictionary cites 1984), but easy online access to William Safire's article about the term has led many (such as the Oxford English Dictionary) to believe that August 28, 1989, was its first use. However, the idiom is found in passing in a quote in a 1965 publication, apparently referring to the wife of Bernie Madoff. The 1994 marriage of former Playboy Playmate Anna Nicole Smith to oil billionaire J. Howard Marshall was widely followed by the US mass media as an extreme example of this concept. At the time of their marriage, he was 89 years old and she was 26.

Elizabeth McClintock, a sociologist at the University of Notre Dame, believes the phenomenon in modern society is less common than other research suggests.

== See also ==
- Age disparity in sexual relationships
- Conspicuous consumption
- How to Marry a Millionaire
- The Millionaire Matchmaker
- Sexual capital
- Sugar baby
- WAGs
- Who Wants to Marry a Multi-Millionaire?
