= Sugar dating =

Person in romantic relationship for financial benefits

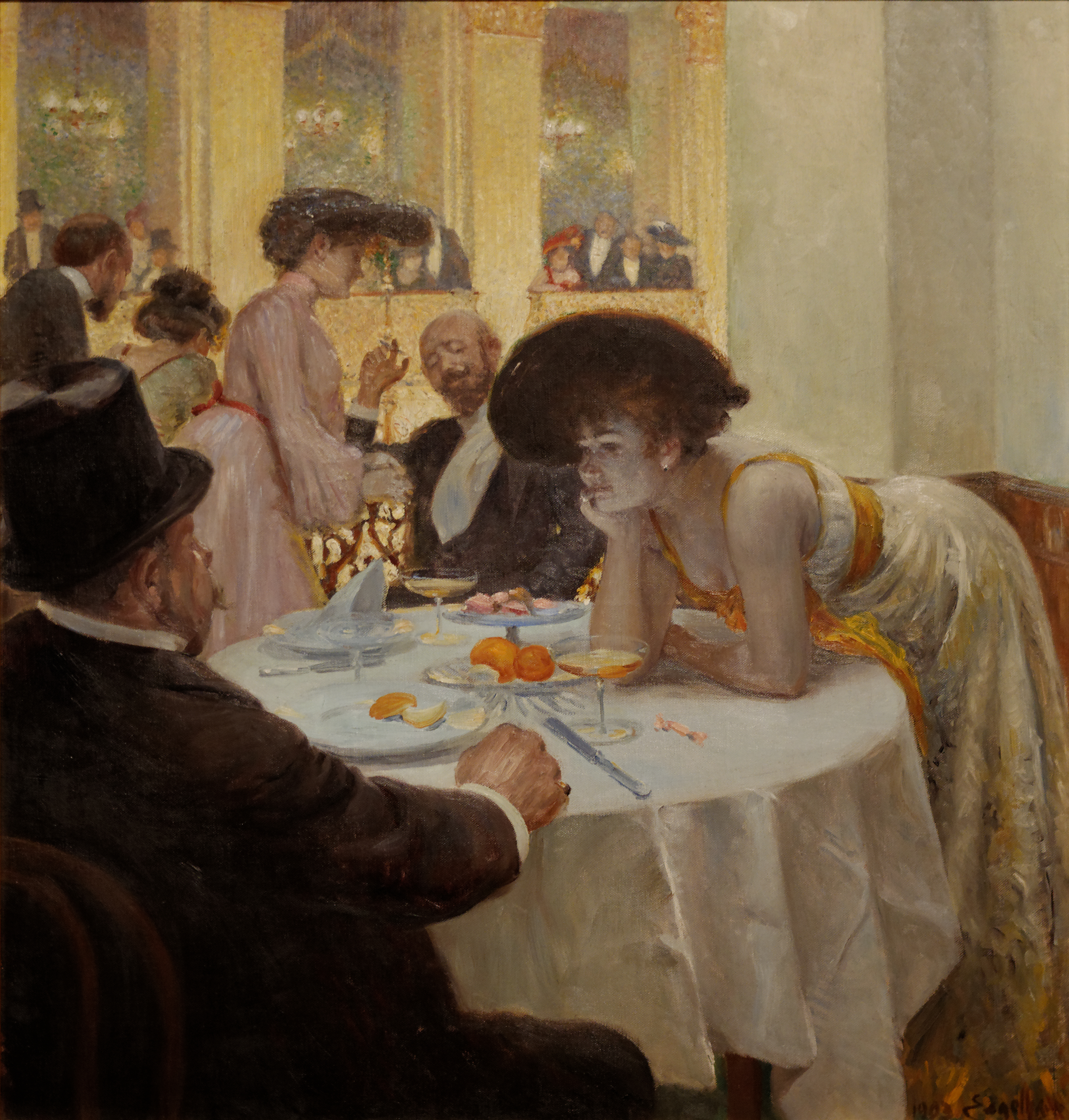
Loge im Sofiensaal by Josef Engelhart, 1903. A scene from the Vienna demimonde of the era.

Sugar dating or sugaring is a type of pseudoromantic interpersonal relationship where one person receives money or gifts in exchange for intimacy or companionship. The provider (called a sugar daddy or sugar mommy) is typically older and wealthier, while the recipient (called a sugar baby) is typically younger, attractive, and interested in improving their quality of life. The recipient can obtain gifts such as jewelry, luxury goods, vacations, fine dining, mentorship, leisure outings, financial support, and offers social benefits such as companionship, dedication, devotion, affection, dating or intimacy.

Sugar dating is especially popular in the online dating community due to the ease of accessing specific niches and desires.

== History and etymology ==
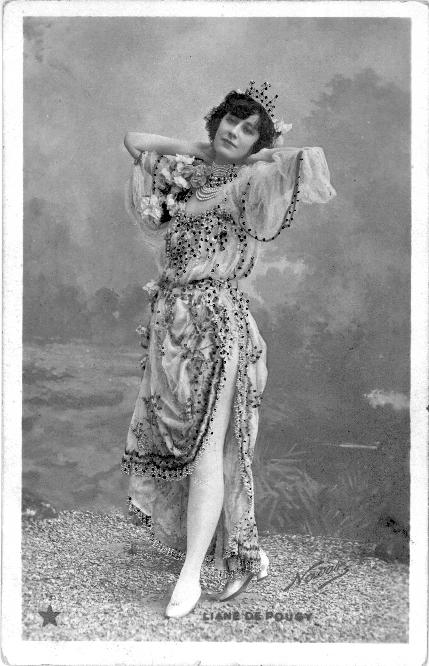
Liane de Pougy, famous demi-mondaine, 1902

Transactional companionship and transactional sex between wealthy and often older men and younger attractive women (or in some cases, young men) has existed throughout history and across many cultures. Various forms of courtesanship, both informal and institutionalized, have existed since antiquity. In France during the Belle Époque era (1871–1914), there was a well-known demimonde of wealthy men and demi-mondaines, attractive women who provided entertainment and companionship. At the end of the 19th century in the United States, a similar phenomenon known as treating arose. In the early 20th century, women who would use their sexual attractiveness to win over wealthy men came to be known as "vamps" and "gold diggers". In Japan and other East Asian countries, the phenomenon of enjo kōsai, which bears a strong resemblance to western "sugaring", has become well-known since the 1990s.

There are several versions of how the terms "sugar daddy" and "sugar baby" originated. (Note: The combination "sugar baby" is far older than its use as a counterpart to "sugar daddy", dating back to the 19th century. It was used variously as a term of endearment or as a nickname or hypocorism for everything from racehorses to sugar subsidies to chorus girls.) Oxford English Dictionary attributes the earliest evidence of "sugar daddy" as being from a 1926 work by British author Gilbert Frankau titled My Unsentimental Journey, a travelogue of his journey through the United States. Merriam-Webster Dictionary and The New Partridge Dictionary of Slang and Unconventional English also list the term as dating from 1926, though without attribution. However, examples of the term's appearance in print exist prior to 1926.

One commonly-stated origin story holds that the term "sugar daddy" originated as a pet name for Adolph B. Spreckels, heir to the Spreckels Sugar fortune, given to him by his much younger paramour Alma de Bretteville, whom Spreckels married in 1908. However, etymologist Michael Quinion argues that this version of the story is doubtful, noting that no contemporary sources link the term to Adolph and Alma Spreckels, and that seemingly the earliest source for this story dates from about 2009. Mention of any such connection is also notably absent from the 1990 biography of Alma de Bretteville Spreckels.

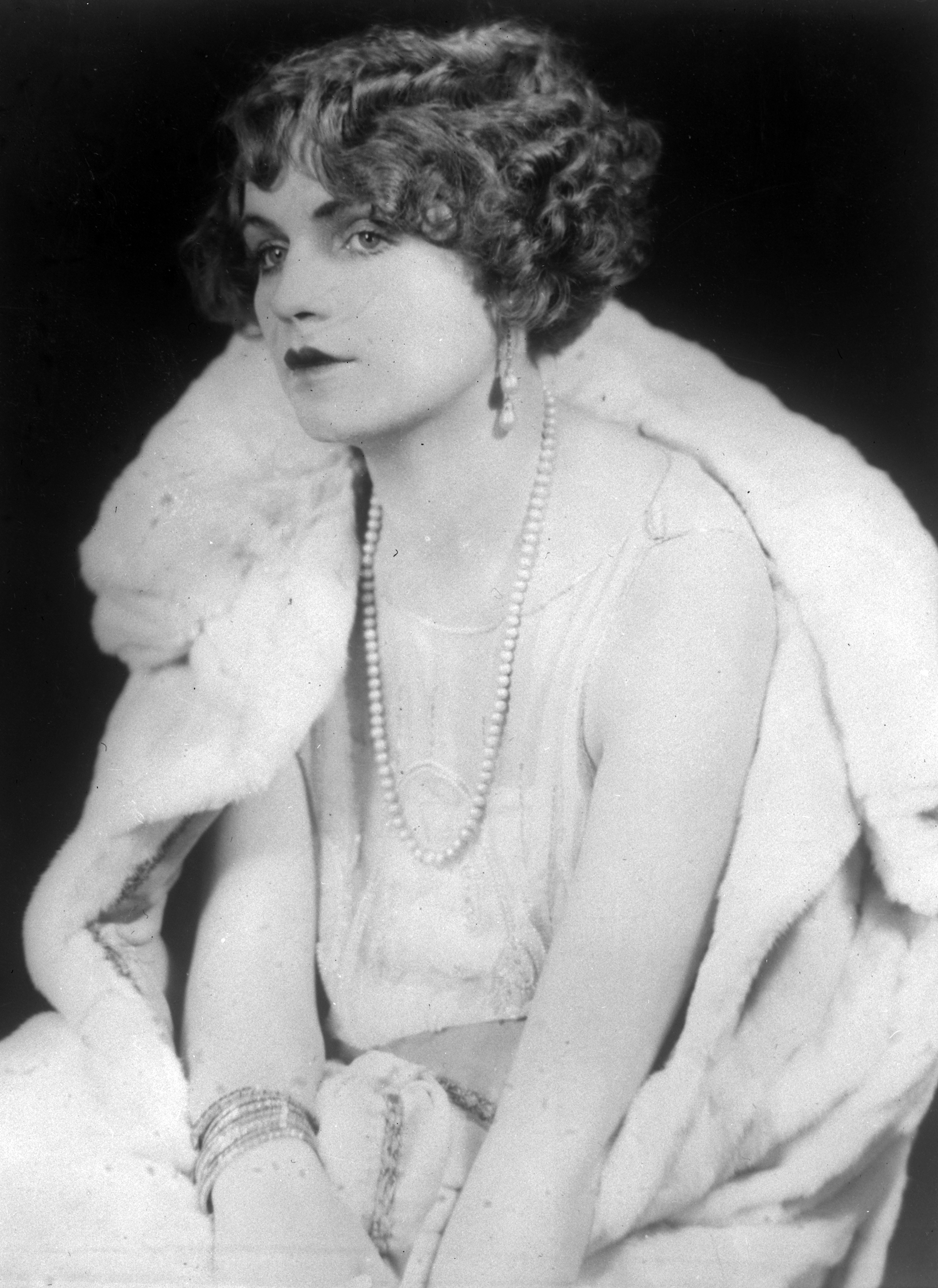
Dorothy "Dot" King (1894–1923), the "Broadway Butterfly"

Michael Quinion, Barry Popik, and several other authors point to the publicity surrounding the unsolved killing of Dorothy "Dot" King in 1923 as the earliest appearance in print of the term "sugar daddy", as well as the analogous "sugar baby". Dot King, nicknamed the "Broadway Butterfly", was a flapper in her late 20s, who had a number of associates and lovers in the New York City demimonde of that era, including wealthy men who patronized her and took care of her expenses, maintaining a well-off lifestyle. Her major benefactor was a Philadelphia financier, John Kearsley Mitchell III, whom King referred to in love letters as her "heavy sugar daddy". Mitchell was not a suspect in the killing, but his relationship with King was publicized during the investigation and the transactional relationship between King and Mitchell became subject of much tabloid fodder and personal scandal for Mitchell.

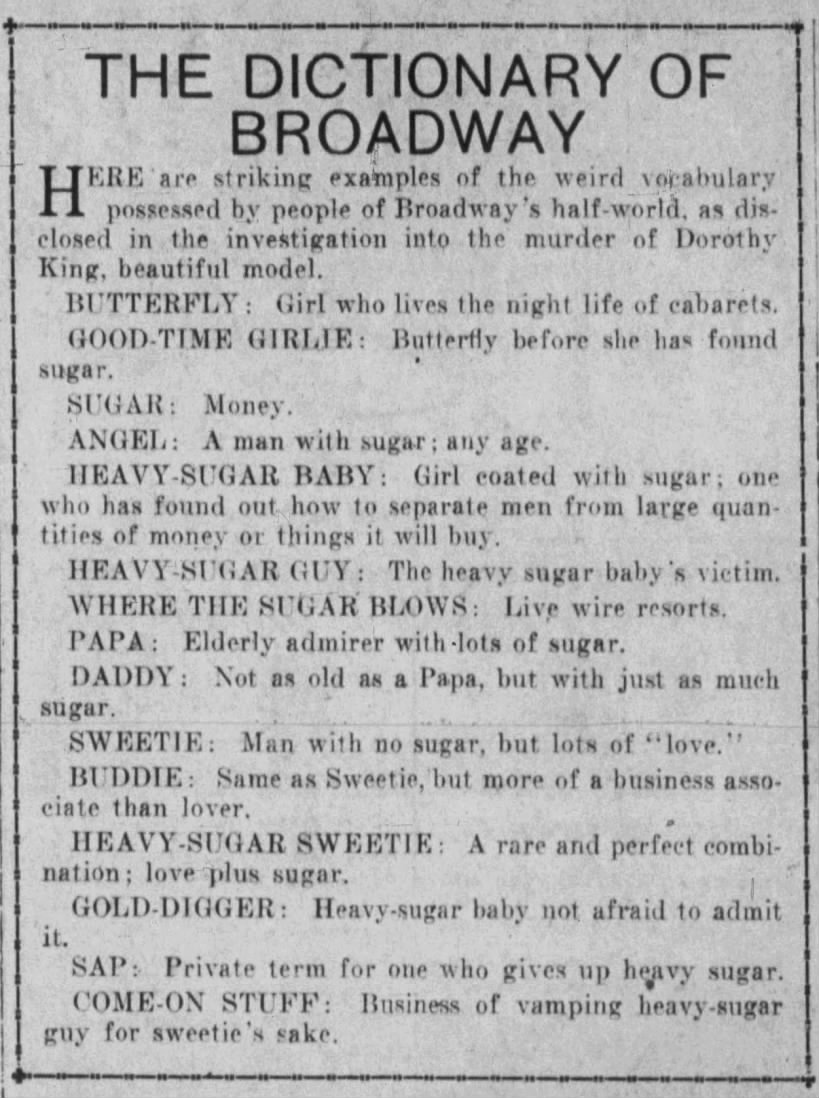
"The Dictionary of Broadway", from a 1923 newspaper

Publicity from the affair introduced the general public to the world of "heavy sugar babies" and "heavy sugar daddies", terms derived from the use of "sugar" as slang for money and "heavy sugar" for large amounts of wealth. The "heavy" part of the terms were soon dropped, and "sugar daddy" and "sugar baby" became part of the English lexicon. The popularization of "sugar baby" came not long after that of the similar term "gold digger", which began in the late 1910s, with reputed gold-digger Peggy Hopkins Joyce being one of the most written-about women in the American press in the 1920s.

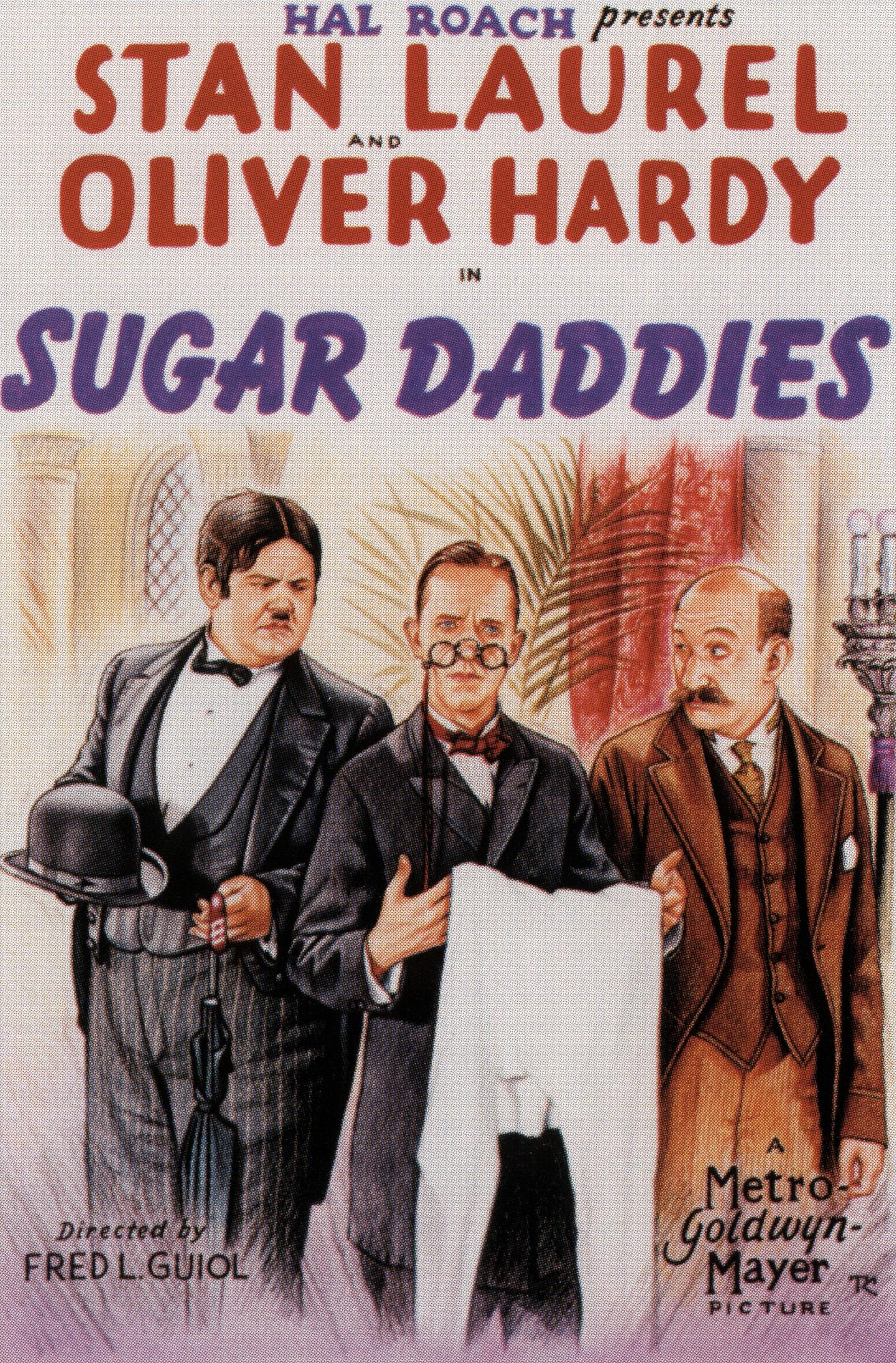
A poster for the Laurel and Hardy film Sugar Daddies (1927)

As was the case with "gold digger", "sugar daddy" became ensconced in popular culture beginning in the 1920s, often in less-risque and light-hearted contexts. A Laurel and Hardy short titled Sugar Daddies was produced in 1927. Sugar Daddy and Sugar Babies brands of candy were introduced in 1932 and 1935, respectively. "Sugar daddy" and "heavy sugar daddy" have also sometimes been used to describe a wealthy patron of a person or institution without any sexual or romantic connotation.

During the 20th century, women who were interested in seeking out wealthy men for financially beneficial relationships would seek entry into social networks frequented by unattached affluent men or seek them directly using personal ads. Similarly, affluent men might seek out partners from those in appearance-based professions such as modeling or adult entertainment, with the often unspoken assumption that the relationship will be transactional in nature. The 2000s saw the rise of "sugaring" websites, a subset of dating sites that were expressly oriented toward sugar daddies (and occasionally mamas) and sugar babies seeking to connect. Among the earliest was Sugardaddie.com, which started in 2002. The growth of sugaring websites led to the rapid growth and increased visibility of the phenomenon of "sugar dating" by the late 2000s, and turned the networking aspect of sugar relationships into a largely online phenomenon.

== Relationship arrangements and motivations ==
=== Diversity of arrangements ===
Research describes sugar dating as encompassing different forms of interpersonal relationship, rather than a single uniform arrangement. A 2026 scoping review of 27 studies found substantial variation in definitions, including differences in the roles of financial compensation, companionship and sexual intimacy. Some arrangements involved sexual activity, while others focused on companionship, mentorship or shared social experiences.

In a study of heterosexual sugar dating in Sweden, Lena Gunnarsson and Sofia Strid examined differences along three dimensions: the activities involved, the form of compensation and the motivations of participants receiving support. Their research drew on 24 interviews and questionnaire data from members of a sugar-dating website. Participants described experiences ranging from explicitly negotiated exchanges to more extensive personal relationships combining material support with dating and companionship. The authors distinguished between participation pursued primarily for material benefits and participation that was also valued for the experiences or relationships themselves.

Maren T. Scull's study, based on 48 in-depth interviews with women in the United States who had experienced sugar relationships, proposed a seven-category typology. It distinguished arrangements involving explicit sexual transactions from other forms of compensated dating, companionship, friendship and romantic attachment. Scull argued that participants enacted sugar relationships in different ways despite sharing a broader cultural understanding of what such relationships involved. Her categories describe patterns identified in the interview material.

=== Compensation and motivations ===
The Swedish study distinguished explicitly negotiated payments from less regulated financial support and arrangements based mainly on covering dating expenses or providing gifts. Non-monetary support could include practical assistance and career-related mentorship. Participants did not necessarily describe these transfers in the same terms: some understood them as payment, while others framed them as gifts, support or being treated by a partner.

The 2026 review grouped reported motivations into financial, experiential and social themes. Across the studies reviewed, material benefits could coexist with interest in companionship, new experiences or personal connections. These findings indicate variation in participants' reasons for entering arrangements, rather than a single motivation shared by everyone involved.

Research has also examined tensions between material exchange and expectations of mutual attraction. In a Swedish study drawing on nine interviews and 37 questionnaire responses from men identifying as sugar daddies, Gunnarsson and Strid found a tension between using economic incentives to obtain access to partners and wanting encounters to be based on mutual enjoyment. The interview participants preferred arrangements involving a personal relationship, making their accounts specific to that group.

=== Limitations of the research ===
The 2026 review identified limited diversity in study samples and a predominant focus on heterosexual arrangements. Most included studies used qualitative methods, and the review covered research published between 2005 and 2022. The authors highlighted the need for broader samples and greater involvement of participants in research design and implementation. These limitations affect how widely findings about relationship forms and motivations can be generalised.

== Prevalence ==
With the rising costs in tuition, cuts to scholarships and bursaries, and the increasing pressures of student debt, sugar dating has become prevalent among students. Some research suggests that there is a growing phenomenon of female university students working in the sex industry to pay for their post-secondary education. Due to the nature and stigmatization of sex work in the marginalized and hidden population, there is limited information on the number of students participating in these types of relationships. Those that decide to participate in sugar dating often use various websites to come in contact with these people. Membership on one site in 2016 was US$70 per month for sugar daddies or mommies, but free for sugar babies.

Attitudes towards sugar relationships are shaped by economic conditions, societal norms, psychological traits, and cultural values. A 2024 research paper suggests that these arrangements are related to traditional gender roles, sociosexual orientation, parasite-stress theory, economic inequality, individualism, and personality traits like the Dark Triad.

== Legality and comparison to sex work ==
There is debate about whether this practice can be considered sex work and whether a clear line between sugaring and sex work exists. Some forms of full-service sex work, such as the girlfriend experience, trade on emotional intimacy and companionship as much as they do the direct purchase of sexual services. Many forms of historical courtesanship have existed in a grey area between transactional companionship and outright prostitution.

Brandon Wade, the CEO of Seeking.com has stated that "escorts and their clients are never welcome on our sites". In Malaysia, sugar dating is illegal, to the point where the CEO of Malaysian sugar dating company Sugarbook was arrested and their website blocked by Malaysian Internet service providers.

== See also ==
- Age disparity in sexual relationships
- Client (prostitution)
- Enjo kōsai
- Host and hostess clubs
- Mistress (lover)
- Trophy wife
- Mail-order bride
