= Cecily Jordan v. Greville Pooley dispute =

Prosecution for breach of promise

The Cecily Jordan v. Greville Pooley dispute was the first known prosecution for breach of promise in colonial America and the first in which the defendant was a woman. This case was tried in the chambers of the Virginia Company, and never went to a civil court, for the plaintiff withdrew his complaint. The first successful case was Stretch v. Parker in 1639.

== Background ==
Reverend Greville Pooley proposed marriage to Cecily Jordan, a widow whose husband (Samuel Jordan) had died 3 or 4 days previously. Pooley subsequently discovered that his bride-to-be had become engaged to another man, William Farrar. The resulting lawsuit for breach of promise was significant because, until then, such suits had only been filed by women against men.

=== Historical context ===
Women - spinster or widow - could own property, and could transfer it in a will. However, they could not patent, purchase or sell land in their own name and own right: for that, a woman needed a male family member.

A woman's marriage options, however, were limited to her social class, which produced limited choices if she was "of quality".

There was such a shortage of suitable women for the upper class in colonial Virginia that upper class men would try to bring their unmarried sisters over.

The Virginia Company set about procuring wives for the tenants of its plantation by offering to each woman who migrated to Virginia a dowry of clothing, linens, furnishings and a plot of land. The younger women who were chosen were of a lower social order but selected for their good character. About 189 maids and one widow were selected and shipped to Virginia, at a cost of £12, each (about $5,000 in 2018 US dollars), the value of 150 pounds of Virginia tobacco. The prospective husband also had to pay the woman's transportation expense.

== Involved parties ==
=== Greville Pooley ===
Greville Pooley was an Anglican pastor who arrived in Jamestown, Virginia in August 1622 aboard the James, and took up residence at Fleur Dieu, a plantation belonging to Sir George Yeardley.

=== Cecily Jordan ===
Cecily Jordan (known in some accounts as Cecilia, Cecily or Sisselye) was born in 1600 and came to the Jamestown colony as a child aboard the ship Swan in 1610.

Living in the household of William Farrar and Cecily Jordan at the time of Jamestown Muster was a female age 7, name of Temperance Baley [sic].

Her second marriage was to Samuel Jordan and she had two daughters with him, Margaret and Mary. Jordan died about April 1623, leaving Cecily a widow with three children.

=== William Farrar ===
William Farrar arrived in Jamestown aboard the Neptune in August 1618. He had a 100-acre patent upon the Appomattox River. He survived the Indian massacre of 1622, and is noted in the Jamestown muster as head of house in the fort of Samuel Jordan, a relatively safe fortified rallying place for the massacre survivors. quoted as follows:

"It is recorded in The Generall Historiie of Virginia, New-England and the Summer Isles, by John Smith (1624) that during the Indian uprising by the Pamunkeys in 1622 when many settlers were killed that "Master Samuel Iordan gathered together but a few of the straglers about him at Beggers Bush which he fortified and lived in despight of the enemy".

After surviving the Indian massacre of 1622, he is found living with Mrs Jordan in 1624 at Jordans Journey.

== Controversy ==
Within a span of four months after Greville Pooley's arrival, his neighbor Samuel Jordan died, leaving Ciceley a widow with two daughters.

According to one account, three or four days after the funeral, Pooley took hold of the hand of Mrs Jordan and pledged himself to her in marriage. She protested that it would not look right because it was too soon after the funeral. Pooley's version of the affair was that he approached Captain Isaac Madison to act as an intermediary for his marriage proposal. Madison asserted that, while she would "as soon marry Mr Pooley as marry anyone else", she would not marry any man until she was delivered of her child.

Pooley, encouraged by this and fearful that some other man would beat him to the "trough", rushed to visit her. During the visit he asked for a drink. She sent a servant to get it; Pooley asked that she get it herself, and afterwards, they drank a toast. He claimed that he then grabbed Mrs Jordan's hand and said: "I Grivell Pooley, take thee Sysley, to my wedded wife, to have, and to hold, till death us depart, and thereto I plight thee my troth." Then (holding her by the hand) she replied "I Sysley, take thee Grivell, to my wedded husband, to have, and to hold, till death us depart". Captain Madison stated that he did not hear Mrs Jordan say any of those words, nor did he remember Pooley asking her if she consented to those words.

Mrs. Jordan, fearful of gossip, asked Pooley to keep the affair a secret, but Pooley began to brag of the proposal and upcoming marriage. This angered Mrs Jordan, and she said, as sworn to by Mrs Mary Madison, "that if he had not revealed it, he might have fared better". Captain Isaac Madison, as recorded in C. O. 1, Vol. II, No. 30 Document in Public Record Office, London List of Records No. 521, testified that he had not heard the words of a proposal, nor acceptance by Mrs. Jordan.

Instead, Mrs Jordan accepted the proposal of William Farrar. Rev Pooley, upon learning that Mrs Jordan had contracted herself to Farrar, filed suit with the Virginia Company. The company could not decide if Rev Pooley's relationship to Mrs Jordan was a formal or legal contract, and deferred it to civil lawyers.

Before the matter could be taken further, Rev Pooley met another widow and dropped the suit. Subsequently, Pooley was the defendant in another suit, brought by a Mr Pawlett, who accused Pooley of insulting him. He was summoned to court in March 1629 because of a dispute with Edward Auborne.

Subsequently, Pooley and his family were all killed in 1629 in an Indian massacre.

== Aftermath of the controversy ==
The governor and council perceived the Jordan-Pooley-Farrar affair to be a dangerous precedent and issued a proclamation against a recurrence. But that didn't dissuade others: within a year, Eleanor Spragg had to stand before her congregation and confess to contracting to two men at the same time. The court, in an attempt to halt the spread of the practice decreed that each minister give warning in his church that offenders, male or female, will be whipped or fined according to their social status Like all prohibitions, this too was ineffective,.

It was not until Stretch v. Parker in 1639 that a breach of promise suit in which the woman was the defendant was successfully pursued.
