= Roberta West Nicholson =

Legislator and civic leader

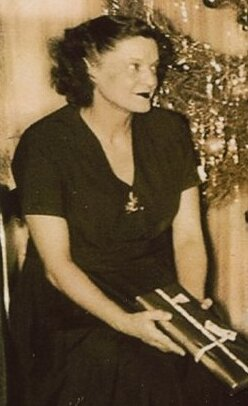
- Born: January 17, 1903; Cincinnati, Ohio, United States
- Died: November 6, 1987 (aged 84)
- Resting place: Crown Hill Cemetery and Aboretum, Section 4, Lot 6; 39.8264098°N 86.1746174°W
- Occupation: Legislator
- Political party: Democratic
- Relatives: Meredith Nicholson (Father in law)

Roberta West Nicholson (January 17, 1903 – November 6, 1987) was a legislator and civic leader in Indiana. She co-founded the Indiana Birth Control League, a precursor of Planned Parenthood of Indiana, contributed to repealing Indiana's prohibition laws, and had a lead role in reforming Indiana's juvenile justice system. Her work to repeal breach of promise laws in Indiana contributed to changes in family law in the United States.

== Early life ==
Roberta West Nicholson was born on January 17, 1903 in Cincinnati, Ohio. She attended and graduated from the University of Cincinnati.

After meeting her husband, Meredith Nicholson Jr. (who was the son of the Indianapolis author Meredith Nicholson), she moved to Indianapolis in 1925.

== Career ==
Roberta West Nicholson dedicated her career to advocating for equality in Indianapolis. Nicholson grew up in a Republican household. However, upon learning about the significant influence of the Ku Klux Klan on the Indiana Republican Party during the 1920s, she became an engaged member of the Democratic Party.

In 1932, Nicholson embarked on her initial reform efforts by co-founding the Indiana Birth Control League, which eventually evolved into Planned Parenthood of Indiana. In this work, she was encouraged by birth control advocate Margaret Sanger. This marked the beginning of Nicholson's extensive advocacy for family planning and social hygiene. She became the inaugural director of the Indianapolis Social Hygiene Association in 1943, which later became the Social Health Association of Central Indiana (now known as LifeSmart Youth). Nicholson remained in this role until her retirement in 1960.

With the support of her father-in-law, Meredith Nicholson, she participated in the movement to repeal prohibition. She voiced concerns about the increase in gang-related crime due to prohibition and worried that her children might perceive her as breaking the law by consuming alcohol. In 1933, she was appointed by the governor, Paul V. McNutt, to serve on the Liquor Control Advisory Board and became a member of the Women's Organization of National Prohibition Repeal. Additionally, she was elected as secretary for the Indiana convention which ratified the 21st Amendment, ultimately repealing Indiana's prohibition laws.

In recognition of her public service, in 1934, the county chairman persuaded her to run for the state legislature. As the sole female member of the Indiana House of Representatives during the 1935-1936 session, she gained national attention for her proposed legislation known as the “Breach of Promise Bill,” alternatively called the “Anti-Heart Balm Bill” and “Gold Diggers Bill.” Nicholson's bill aimed to prohibit individuals, primarily women, from suing their fiancés for breaking engagements or marriages for their spouse's infidelity. Nicholson's legislative career also contributed to re-codifying Indiana's insurance laws.

After leaving office, Nicholson became the director of Women's and Professional work for Marion County's chapter of the Works Progress Administration (WPA). She led Indianapolis's WPA seamstresses in producing garments for the 1937 Ohio River Flood victims. These workers were based at the Indiana State Fairgrounds, where the Red Cross relocated flood victims during the crisis. First Lady Eleanor Roosevelt paid a visit to the seamstresses, and Nicholson perceived her endorsement of their work as affirming the value of the WPA project.

Nicholson actively participated in various civic organizations and events. She held positions in the League of Women Voters, Council of Social Agencies, the Indianapolis Orphans’ Home, Junior League of Indianapolis, Parent-Teacher Association, Mayor’s Advisory Committee on Recreation, and the state advisory committee on child welfare. Additionally, she served as the state chairwoman for the World’s Fair in New York, the President’s Birthday Ball, and a committee aiding orphans from China.

During World War II Nicholson worked to the establish an Indianapolis Servicemen’s Center following the passage of the Selective Service Act. The center, meant to serve African American soldiers, received fewer donations Indianapolis businesses than she expected. As a result, Nicholson established the center with private funding at Camp Atterbury. Subsequently, she encouraged and pressured businesses to support the new facility.

Nicholson dedicated herself to advocating for reform in the juvenile justice system. She co-founded and served on the Juvenile Court Bi-Partisan Committee, an organization that collaborated across political lines to nominate qualified candidates. Additionally, she was part of the Juvenile Court Advisory Committee, a group of child welfare activists who regularly met with Juvenile Court judges to offer counsel and assistance.

Nicholson also contributed to supporting underprivileged children through her involvement with the Children's Bureau of Indianapolis. The bureau placed children in foster homes and worked to address their medical, social, and educational needs. Beginning in 1935, Nicholson served on its board, a position that she held in honor for the rest of her life.

== Honors ==
In 1957, Nicholson was honored with the Distinguished Public Service Award by the Indiana Public Health Association for her exceptional contributions to public health.

== End of life ==
Suffering from ulcers and seeking a place of rest, Nicholson purchased a house in Brown County as a retreat in 1952. In 1960, Nicholson stepped down from her role as the inaugural director of the Indianapolis Social Hygiene Association, a position she had held since 1943. She suffered from ulcers, likely brought on by excessive exertion. Nicholson died in her home on November 6, 1987.
