= Sugarbook =

Southeast Asian online dating service

- Website type: Online dating service Social network service
- Owner: Darren Chan Eu Boon
- Website: sugarbook.com / sugarbook.app
- Commercial: Yes
- Registration: Yes
- Launched: 2016
- Current status: Active

Sugarbook is an online dating service that was founded in Kuala Lumpur, Malaysia. Sugarbook is most popular in the Southeast Asian countries of Malaysia, Singapore and Philippines.

The site is controversial in Malaysia, the country where it was founded. On February 23, 2021, Sugarbook founder and CEO, Darren Chan was arrested by Malaysian police and put in lockup for 10 days, as authorities in the Muslim-majority country believed that Chan had violated anti-prostitution laws.

== History ==
Sugarbook was founded by Darren Chan in Kuala Lumpur, Malaysia in 2016. The site focuses on connecting "sugar daddies" with "sugar babies." The "sugar babies" can register for free, while the "sugar daddies" pay membership fees to find matches.

== Controversy ==
=== Formula One sponsorship ===
In 2018, Sugarbook had sponsored a party as part of the Singapore Tourism Board's Formula One-themed Sky Grande Prix event, but it was cancelled due to the controversial nature of the company's platform.

=== Arrest of founder and ban in Malaysia ===
On February 23, 2021, Sugarbook Founder and CEO, Darren Chan was arrested and put in lockup for 10 days. The arrest was internationally condemned, prompting attorneys and netizens to questions its legality. Chan later pleaded not guilty to the charges.

Sugarbook was also blocked by Malaysian ISPs, but users in Malaysia found ways to bypass the blocks, such as using VPNs. There was a public outcry across the Asia-Pacific region, with the media publishing articles about the controversy in Thailand, Singapore, and Hong Kong.

A day after the ban the company circumvented the block by using the URL sucrebook.com.

On April 4, 2021, Darren Chan spoke out about the case to VICE News. Chan's arrest also prompted coverage from the BBC, New York Post, Astro AEC, among others.

=== Google Play ban ===
As of September 1, 2021, Google has banned Sugarbook and a number of other sugar baby apps from its Google Play store.

== See also ==
- Comparison of online dating services
- SeekingArrangement
- Tinder (app)
- Censorship in Malaysia
- Human rights in Malaysia
