= Killing of Dot King =

1923 unsolved murder

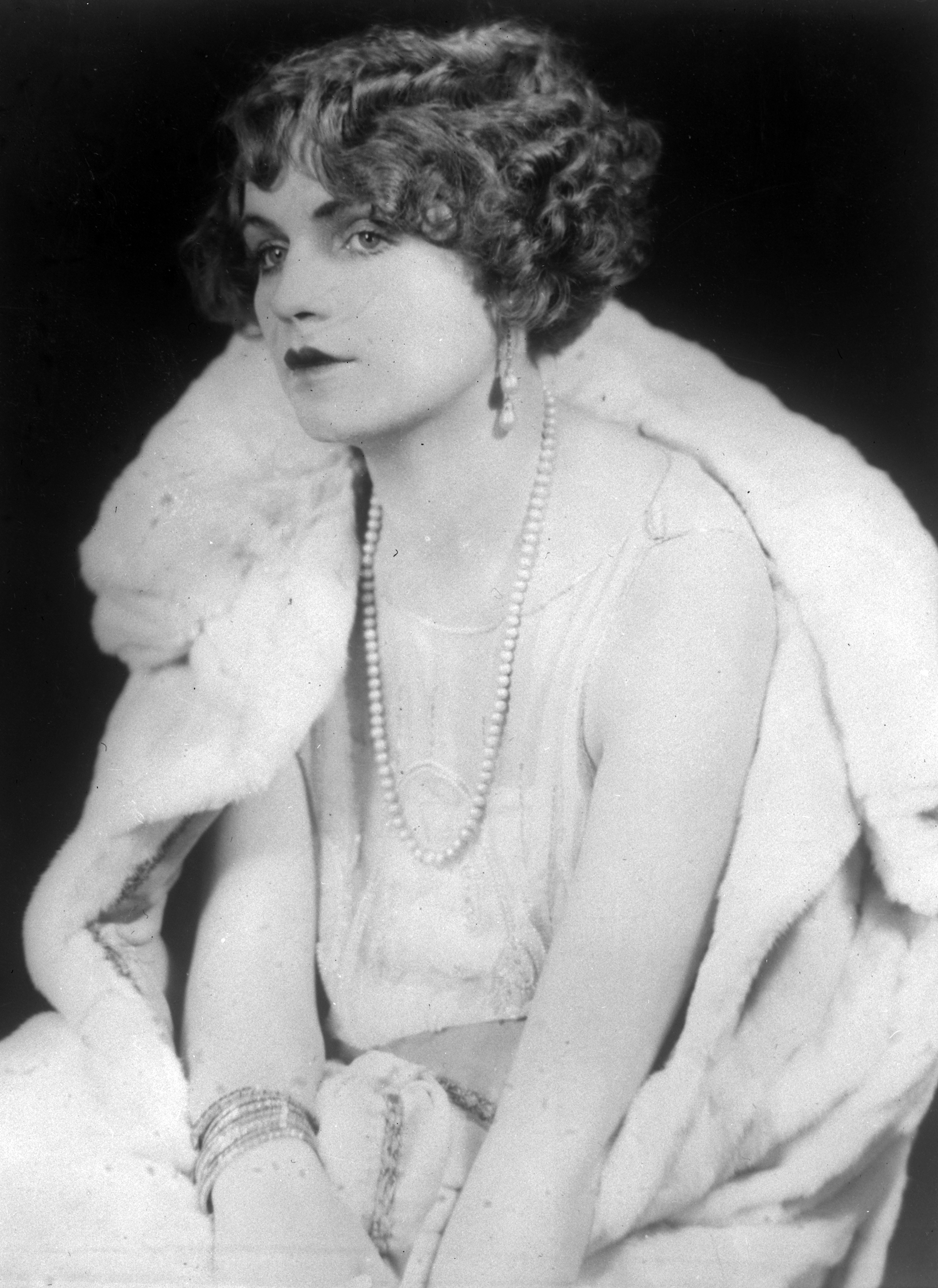
- Dorothy "Dot" King, victim of the murder
- Date: March 15, 1923
- Time: between 7 and 7:30 a.m.
- Location: 144 West 57th Street, New York City, US
- Type: Murder
- Perpetrator: Unknown

On the morning of March 15, 1923, the body of Dorothy King, 29, (born Anna Marie Keenan) was found in her apartment at 144 West 57th Street in the Manhattan borough of New York City, United States. King was a model, actress, and demimondaine whom the press dubbed "The Broadway Butterfly". Her still-unsolved murder was a press sensation at the time it occurred. The term "sugar baby", originally New York City nightlife slang, may have been popularized by journalists reporting on the case.

== Background ==
Dorothy "Dot" King was born Anna Marie Keenan, the youngest of four children to a poor family. In 1912 she married a traveling salesman, Eugene H. Oppel, but the couple divorced in 1914, whereupon Keenan took the name of Dorothy King.

King began working as a model in a fashionable dress-making house, also earning money as a dancer and courtesan. Her lifestyle at this time became conspicuously lavish.

== Investigation ==
The condition of the body and crime scene are described by Arthur A. Carey, a detective assigned to the case, in his 1930 Memoirs of a Murder Man. According to Carey, King's body was discovered by a maid, who entered King's fifth-floor studio apartment at around 11:30 a.m. on March 15, 1923. The death, which the maid reported to a policeman posted in the vicinity, was considered a suicide by poisoning by first responders, who based this assessment on burns around King's mouth and an empty bottle found in the bed with her. King's body lay on its right side, with the left arm under the body and the right hand dangling off the bed; a pillow half-covered the head. A time of death between 7 and 7:30 a.m. was gathered from the maid's testimony that, on her discovery of the body, the feet were cold but the chest was still warm.

Later that day, Carey writes, an examiner expressed his doubts about the suicide verdict to Carey, upon which Carey went to investigate the apartment, where it immediately became evident to him that King had been murdered, a finding corroborated by assistant medical examiner George P. LeBrun. A search for fingerprints was conducted, with no results, and photographs of the crime scene were taken. Evidence noted at the time included "an empty bottle which had contained chloroform and pieces of absorbent cotton," near which lay "a vest pocket comb such as a man might carry and which apparently had fallen out of the pocket of a man as he leaned over the bed to apply the chloroform." An umbrella was found in the hallway on a rack; inside of it was another, similar piece of cotton. Under a couch in the living room was stuffed a pair of large, yellow men's pajamas. The state of her sheets indicated that a struggle had taken place. Two coats belonging to King were found on the floor by the living room door. The telephone had been moved from King's nightstand to another room. LeBrun adds the details that "a large wad of cotton was jammed under her nostrils," and that several unsigned wills, sealed with wax, lay on the floor next to the bed. By the time it became evident to police that King had been murdered, rigor mortis had set in, and the time of death was harder to accurately estimate. The autopsy found that the death was due to chloroform, that there were bruises around King's mouth and a slight abrasion inside her lower lip.

The perpetrator's mode of entry and exit posed difficulties for investigators. The lock on the door from the living room into the outer hallway had not been forced, and the bedroom window was open; Carey concludes that King may have voluntarily admitted the killer through the door, and does not rule out the window as a possible point of entry. As to the motive, Carey writes, he was certain it was a case of robbery: the telephone would not have been moved had the killer known they had murdered King, and the use of chloroform suggests an intent only to render her unconscious. He deduces from this latter fact that the perpetrator was unknown to King, as her recovery would have meant identification had they been familiar to her. According to a contemporary New York Times article, "the peculiar construction of the house, 144 to 146 West Fifty-seventh Street, made an unobserved entry difficult, but that any one might have slipped down the stairs in 146, without coming within the range or vision of the elevator operator in 144."

Valuable items were missing from the apartment: $15,000 worth of jewelry ($220,000 in 2025) had been taken, as well as an ermine fur coat, a costly wrap, a suitcase, and cash. The subject matter familiarity implied in the killer's choice of clothing was taken to mean that the crime was the work of a professional thief. The coats by the door were explained as overflow from the stolen suitcase in which the killer had packed the items. Carey makes racially charged comments about the nature of the theft, which he believed to be consistent with the actions of Black criminals. The New York Times article states that the police believed that the value of King's jewels came to the attention of "some one familiar with her habits [who] passed the information to a hanger-on, who carried through the theft. They believe that this man gained access to the building and secreted himself where he or a confederate could observe conditions in the girl's apartment." This article also proposes that the death was a mistake, that "the drug applier knew little of the potency of chloroform and continued to tame [sic] the gauze-and-cotton soaked mask against the girl's nose and mouth until death came." The detectives also believed that the window had been opened so as to dissipate the chloroform fumes.

The maid provided many letters from admirers to Dot King. According to the maid, many of these had been sent by a Bostonian named Mr. Marshall, who also owned the pajamas found under the couch. She characterized this Mr. Marshall as "a nice man", "tall, dignified, and white-haired", and said she believed he had stayed over the night before the killing. She also indicated that she did not think Marshall was his real name. Marshall had taken King out for lunch with his secretary on March 14, and promised to take her to dinner that evening: on getting home after lunch, King called another man, Albert Guimares, to tell him about jewels and money that Marshall had given her. Marshall then came back to take her to dinner, and afterwards returned with King to her apartment, staying until 2:30 a.m., when the elevator operator took him downstairs. Marshall was not fully identified until his attorney told an assistant district attorney that his client wished to make a deposition. He admitted that Marshall was not his real name, but did not provide his true identity. Carey came away with the impression that he had nothing to do with the murder. Marshall's identity was never officially released, but a reporter tracked the phone bills from the Ritz-Carlton switchboard to find the call Marshall had declaredly made to King the day before the murder, and found he was a J. Kearsley Mitchell, a man in his fifties, husband of Frances B. Stotesbury, daughter of banker Edward B. Stotesbury. Chief Assistant District Attorney Ferdinand Pecora denied the existence of love letters from Marshall to King, and stated that all his gifts to her had been in cash.

Eugene Oppel, King's ex-husband, was also questioned in the investigation, but nothing came of it; Oppel stated he had only seen King three times since their divorce, and on none of these occasions had they spoken.

Albert Guimares was arrested in connection with the murder. He was Puerto Rican, described by LeBrun as "swarthy". King's mother had previously told detectives that Guimares had been romantically involved with her daughter, and had been physically and psychologically abusive to her. Guimares had a criminal record, having before "dealt in worthless stocks and bonds". On his previous arrest, King had paid his bail. Guimares admitted being romantically involved with King, and that King had routinely given him gifts, including, LeBrun writes, "a thirteen-hundred dollar platinum watch, a seven-hundred dollar fur overcoat ... and with the cash she gave him, he opened a brokerage office"; at the time of his arrest, he was observed to be wearing a pair of diamond cufflinks that had been given by Marshall to King, and which she had given Guimares some time before her death. There were several bruises on Guimares' right hand, which he stated were the result of a fight the night before; his testimony on this point was later verified. Guimares had a solid alibi, as he was clubbing with friends on the night of March 14, and was served breakfast in his hotel room at around 7:30 on the morning of the 15th. As a gun was found in his hotel room, he was held under the Sullivan Act, but was released after it was found that "he could not have been in the King apartment immediately before, during, or after the murder." Soon after, he was arrested again, convicted of fraud and imprisoned in Atlanta. When he died in 1952, the murder was still enough in the public consciousness at that time for Guimares to get an obituary referencing it in the New York Times.

== Press reaction ==
The popular press objected strongly to the exculpation of Mr. Marshall, as well the police's decision not to force him to reveal his name; it attributed these facts to Marshall's wealth, and contrasted his treatment with that of Guimares. Guimares' attorney also made a statement to the press to this effect. According to LeBrun: "Within twenty-four hours the public was less concerned about who had killed the butterfly girl than it was in getting the answer to the intriguing question, 'Who is Mr. Marshall?'" The unsigned wills were also a significant source of speculation.

Major Draper Dougherty, a friend of King's, was speculated by the press to have been involved, on the grounds that his army service would have allowed him access to chloroform. However, the army provided chloroform in tins, not in bottles like the one found by King's body, and Dougherty was not considered by police as a suspect. Daugherty told reporters that he had been involved with King and that one of King's brothers, Francis Keenan, had been trying to blackmail him so that Daugherty would obtain him a job with the Secret Service. Shortly after, Daugherty was committed to a sanitarium by his wife for alcohol abuse.

== In culture ==
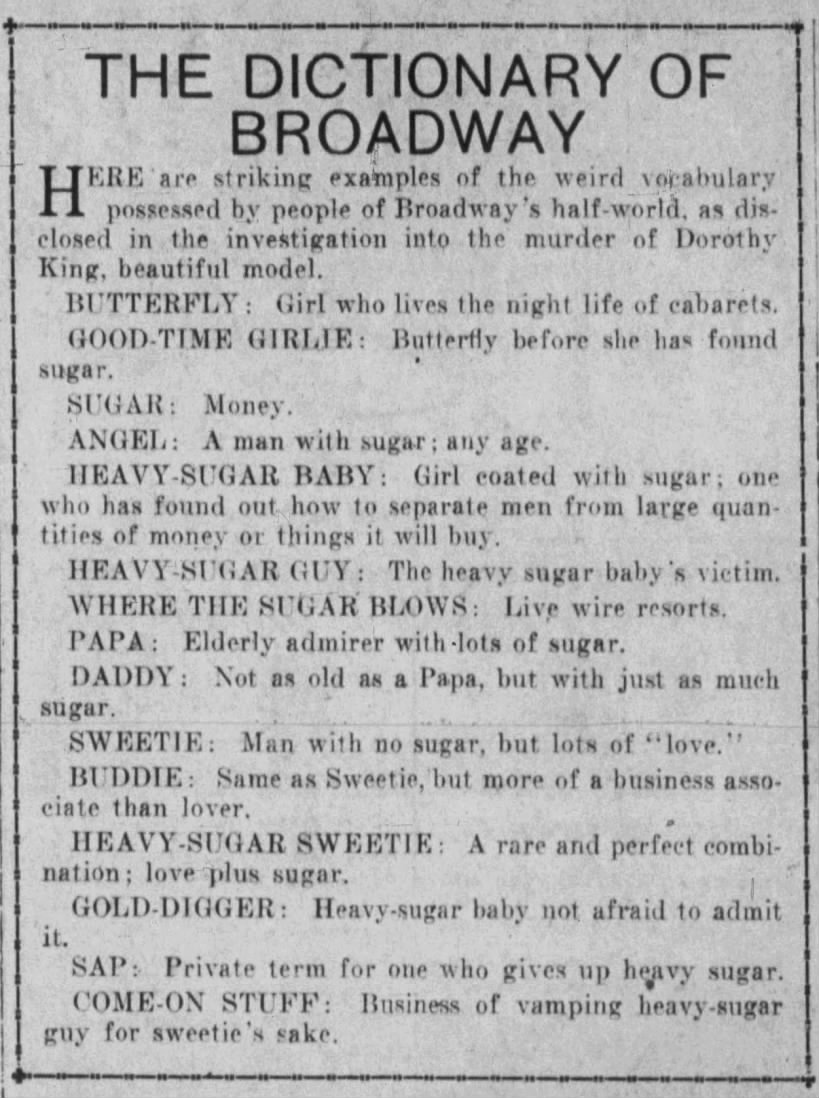
Glossary of Broadway slang contained in reporting around the murder, 1923. See "Heavy-sugar Baby".

Etymologist Barry Popik points to the tabloid publicity around the King murder as a principal factor in the popularization of the term "sugar baby".

Several books have been written dealing with King's murder; beside those by Carey and LeBrun, there is Murder Won't Out (1932), a pulp by Russel Crouse, Who Killed the Broadway Butterfly, by George Anthony, Broadway Butterfly (2023) by Sarah Divello, and Chronicle of Murder (2004), by Brian Lane.

== See also ==
- List of unsolved murders (1900–1979)
