= Enjo kōsai =

Japanese term for "compensated dating"

Enjo kōsai (援助交際; literally "aid or support" and "congress, intercourse, intermingling"), shortened to enkō (援交), is a type of transactional relationship similar to the Western sugar dating. It is the Japanese language term for the practice of older men giving money or luxury gifts to attractive young women for sexual favors. The female participants range from school girls (or JK business) to housewives. The term is often translated as "compensated dating" or "subsidized dating".

The opposite case of women paying men, gyaku enjo kōsai (逆援助交際; gyaku 逆 meaning "reverse"), is rarer, but host clubs do exist. Fraudulent solicitations from fictive women offering to pay for sex is a common tactic in phishing emails.

== Definition ==
The most common denotation of the term enjo-kōsai in Japan is that it is a form of child prostitution whereby participating girls sell sex in exchange for designer goods or money. However, some organizations and writers have argued that enjo-kōsai is distinct from prostitution, and can include just spending time together for compensation. Some women's centers in Japan include "the exchange of a girl's company or time" as part of this equation and insist that these other activities define enjo-kōsai. Anthropologist Laura Miller argues in her research that the majority of enjo-kōsai dates consist of groups of girls going with a group of older men to a karaoke bar for several hours and being paid for their time.

== Prevalence in Japan ==
In a 1998 survey by the Asian Women's Fund, researchers found that fewer than 10 percent of all high school girls engage in enjo-kōsai and over 90 percent of the girls interviewed attested to feeling uncomfortable with the exchange or purchase of sexual services for money.

On October 26, 2015, Maud de Boer-Buquicchio, the United Nations Human Rights Council's Special Rapporteur on the sale of children, child prostitution and child pornography, announced that 30% of Japanese minors are involved in enjo-kōsai. On November 2, she revised that estimate to 13%, citing a translation error. In response, the Ministry of Foreign Affairs of Japan insisted on disclosing the source and basis of the figure of 13%, and urged the Special Rapporteur to retract her statement, arguing that it was unacceptable to quote unsubstantiated figures to emphasize that this was an urgent matter for the Special Rapporteur to address, or to quote unreliable information in a press conference or report that even the source could not reveal. The UN Special Rapporteur finally wrote to the Japanese government to report that she would no longer use the 13% figure and would not mention it in her report to the UN Human Rights Council because she concluded that there was no official or recent data to support the figure and that any reference to the data was misleading.

== Perceptions in Japanese society ==
A 1997 poll in the Japanese TV Asahi program Asa Made Nama Terebi showed that 70 percent of respondents opposed enjo-kōsai involving sexual interactions, while 30 percent approved of it. Although the greater part of Japanese society discourages this type of behavior, that has not stopped people of high social and economic status from being arrested for their involvement with enjo kōsai.

Typically, it is perceived as an extension of Japan's growing focus on materialism, much of which is what critics claim is the cause of enjo-kōsai. Critics worry that girls involved in enjo-kōsai will grow up to be unfit wives and mothers. This perception arises from suspicions that when these girls are adults, they will quickly abandon their loyalties and commitments to their family for offers of money and material benefits. However, certain feminists regard enjo-kōsai as an empowering way to "undermine patriarchal models of propriety used to evaluate and control women". Control over their bodies and means to support themselves is a new kind of independence for these girls. Good women in Japan are supposed to be sensible, modest, nurturing and respectful, yet girls participating in enjo-kōsai clearly reject such virtues of female restraint and modesty in Japan. Feminists such as Chizuko Ueno point out that the accidental access of girls to this dating market was not a matter of ethics, but of probability. Sooner or later, these girls and young women would, in a desire for financial independence, tap into this market for their own empowerment. However, Ueno points out that while engaging in enjo-kōsai may appear beneficial for young women in the short term, it also reinforces patriarchal power structures by leaving the notion that women's bodies exist to serve male desire unchallenged.

== Media depiction ==
Within Japan, the media tends to show enjo-kōsai in a rather negative light. The typical scenario involves a girl desperate for money, so she decides to partake in enjo-kōsai. Only later does she stop when a friend or individual intervenes and informs her of the potential risks and consequences of her behavior. Several examples from films and television series are listed below.

Masato Harada's 1997 film Bounce Ko Gals follows the story of a Japanese schoolgirl in Tokyo who is convinced to try enjo-kōsai as a way to raise money quickly after being robbed. Harada uses the plot as a metaphor for and critique of Japanese consumerism, in which everything including people becomes a product.

In Hideaki Anno's 1998 movie Love & Pop, the main character, a 16-year-old high school girl named Hiromi, goes on subsidized dates in order to purchase a ring she adores. Her parents do not pay much attention to her and Hiromi often hangs out with her three closest friends who have been going on subsidized dates. Hiromi follows her friends and begins doing the same. Throughout the movie, they meet with different kinds of men and accompany them in various activities. These activities include having dinner at a restaurant, tasting a man's cooking, singing at a karaoke bar and visiting in a video rental store. Although Hiromi nearly gives in and has sex for the remainder of money needed for the ring, her date gives her a lesson on why she should not do so.

In the 1998 Japanese live action drama series GTO (Great Teacher Onizuka), a female student named Miyabi, out of boredom and lack of adult supervision at home, pressures her friends, Chikako and Erika, to go on subsidized dates with older men, and to steal their money when the men are in the showers. Chikako accidentally meets their teacher Onizuka on one of these dates. In the hotel room, Chikako insists that Onizuka take a shower. Onizuka realizes the trap, stops Chikako's attempt to escape, and teaches her a lesson why her first sexual experience should come out of love and not have anything to do with money. Incidentally, Onizuka (himself a virgin) learns the same lesson from that very occasion.

Conversation over the controversy of enjo-kōsai even finds its way into shows geared toward girls (shōjo) between the ages of 11 and 14 in the form of the highly popular Super Gals! 2001 anime series. During the first episode of the series, straight A student Aya goes on subsidized dates because she wants to have money and fun like the other girls, but also because her strict parents and schedule do not allow her to have a job.

In the 1998 anime series Initial D, highschool student Natsuki Mogi is into enjo-kōsai, going out with a rich older man ("Papa"/"Daddy") who gives her gifts in exchange.

In the anime series My-HiME, it's believed that a shady girl named Nao Yuuki is into enjo-kōsai. She does use her computer to arrange dates over the internet, under the name Juliet, but instead of going through them, she uses her "Child" creature named Julia to rob her patrons and beat them up. It is explained later that Nao does it out of revenge on men and especially thieves, since thieves killed her father and seriously injured Nao's mother leaving her in a coma.

In the 2018 anime series FLCL Progressive, Aiko is a girl-for-hire for Goro Mouri.

The 2020 anime series Rent-A-Girlfriend, first serialized as a manga in 2017, inverts the portrayal of enjo-kōsai by focusing on the main male character, Kazuya Kinoshita, who rents a girlfriend after being dumped by his ex.

Japanese idol group AKB48's second major label single, "Seifuku ga Jama o Suru" (制服が邪魔をする, (School) uniform is getting in the way) drew public attention with its controversial music video, which is a literal visualization of the lyrics, somewhat hinting at the subject of enjo-kōsai. Even the sales copy on its TV commercial was "Otousan, gomennasai" (お父さん、ごめんなさい, Sorry, dad), a comment made by Atsuko Maeda, who played a key role on its video clip.

== Government regulation ==
Prostitution has been illegal in Japan since 1958, but only prostitutes and pimps were punished, with clients escaping any penalty from the law. During SCAP's occupation of Japan, the Child Welfare Law was introduced into legislation as a means to protect children from "lewd behavior". Many have criticized the law as being too vague to protect Japanese children from sexual abuse and say it does not do enough to keep girls away from sex markets.

During the 1990s enjo-kōsai, as well as other forms of child exploitation, gained national attention in Japan leading to international awareness. Due to pressure from outside NGOs and other industrialized nations, the Tokyo government updated its laws relating to child exploitation. The Law for Punishing Acts Related to Child Prostitution and Child Pornography and for Protecting Children, which prohibited an adult from paying a person under the age of 18 for obscene acts, was passed in 1999.

To combat enjo-kōsai and other forms of juvenile misbehavior, many prefectures have instituted a program of hodō (補導; "guidance", "protective custody"). Hodōin are plain-clothed police officers who approach youths who appear to be participating in juvenile delinquency (out past 11 p.m., under-age smoking, under-age drinking, etc.) and offer guidance against such behavior. When police consider it necessary, teens are taken to a juvenile center or police station for "formal guidance" and entered into a confidential police directory. Since enjo-kōsai is seen as a moral problem relating to Japanese youth, care is taken not to ostracize the girls but instead give them assistance and advice to steer them away from enjo-kōsai.

== Other countries or districts ==
=== Taiwan ===
The use of the term began to spread to other East Asian countries in the late 1990s via media. The idea of compensated dating became popular in Taiwan after the airing of the Japanese dorama God, Please Give Me More Time (JOCX), in which a young woman engages in the activity and suffers social and physical costs. In the end, however, the heroine is able to turn her life around, and seems to project a positive image to youth instead. According to academic Oi-Wan Lam, Taiwanese teens identified with the love story's plot and the subculture of the characters. Lam also points to the similarities between Taiwanese and Japanese subcultures, and the notion that enjo-kōsai is not actually an occupation, writing, "Sex work is not recognized by the society as a form of work". Due to this lack of recognition, teens in both cultures feel they would not face real consequences for participating in the activity.

A key difference between enjo-kōsai in Japan and Taiwan is the way in which girls set up "dates" with clients. While telephone clubs were the main venues that facilitated enjo-kōsai in Japan, the Internet facilitates most meetings between girls and clients in Taiwan. Due to this, there have been attempts by several NGOs and the Taiwanese government to regulate Internet sites. The difficulty of regulation efforts is compounded by the fact that NGOs and the Taiwanese government sometimes apply the term enjo-kōsai to more than just teenage compensated dating, but also prostitution and Internet pornography sites.

=== South Korea ===
Compensated dating also happens in South Korea, where the South Korean government considers it a form of prostitution. An annual report by ECPAT International, published in 2004, asserts that 222 girls 18 and younger were arrested for participating in enjo-kōsai in the year 2000. South Korea, similar to Japan, passed a law in 2000 protecting children from exploitation and prostitution. Yet due to the nature of enjo-kōsai, specifically the decision of the girl to participate in the act, the girls who participate in enjo-kōsai are not protected under the law and are instead subject to punishment under the law.

=== Hong Kong ===
According to social workers, teenagers as young as 15 advertise themselves as available for "compensated dating". The practice is becoming more acceptable among Hong Kong teenage girls, who do not think compensated dating is a kind of prostitution. Some believe it is different because it does not involve sexual intercourse and they can choose their clients, who range from teenage boys to married men. Some even think they are helping others. The internet allows girls more opportunities to offer to shop, eat out or go to a movie with men in return for payment to fulfill their material needs. However, due to the nature of this practice, sexual intercourse unavoidably happens in many cases. In April 2008, the brutal murder of Wong Ka-mui, a 16-year-old girl who was taking part in compensated dating, drew attention to the issue.

=== United States ===
With the economy in recession and tuition costs rising, many American students are heavily in debt. Faced with financial difficulties, a number of female college students or new graduates are turning to a "sugar daddy" for financial help. According to a report by The Huffington Post in 2011, the arrangements involve women signing up for free on websites such as "sugar baby" candidates, using their college email addresses. Male clients, referred to as "sugar daddies", join these websites with paid subscriptions as proof of their financial means. The individuals are matched online, followed by personal meetings at a public place, such as a coffee shop. Each candidate decides whether the other candidate is suitable, i.e. age, physique, personality, and so on. If the candidate is desirable, the next date may involve sex. The Huffington Post reported compensation of about $500 per night. Ideal "sugar babies" appear to be college students below the "mid twenties".

== See also ==
- Age disparity in sexual relationships
- Burusera
- Kogal
- Geisha
- Girlfriend experience
- Prostitution
- Salaryman
- Sugar baby
- Treating (dating)
