= Breach of promise =

Common law tort relating to promise to marry

Breach of promise is a common-law tort, abolished in many jurisdictions. It was also called breach of contract to marry, and the remedy awarded was known as heart balm.

From at least the Middle Ages to the early 20th century, many jurisdictions regarded a man's promise of engagement to marry a woman as a legally binding contract. If the man subsequently changed his mind, he would be said to be in "breach" of this promise and could be subject to litigation for damages.

The converse of that was seldom true. The concept that "it's a woman's prerogative to change her mind" had at least some basis in law (though a woman might pay a high social price for exercising this privilege). Unless a dowry of money or property had changed hands, or the woman could be shown to have become engaged to a man only to enable her use of his money, a man could rarely recover in a "breach of promise" suit against a woman if he was even allowed to file one.

Changing social attitudes toward morals have led to a decline in the number of legal actions in response to "jilting". Most jurisdictions, at least in the English-speaking common-law world, have become increasingly reluctant to intervene in cases of personal relationships not involving the welfare of children or actual violence. Many of them have repealed all laws regarding such eventualities, and in others, the statute allowing such an action may technically remain on the books, but the action has become very rare and unlikely to be pursued with any probability of success. Arising in its stead are judicial opinions and/or statutes permitting a breach-of-contract action for wedding expenses incurred when the nuptials are called off or for loss of employment, moving and living expenses incurred by one party as a result of an engagement, which is later broken.

== Cause of action ==
A breach of promise suit required a legally valid marriage engagement. Under Nevada law, this need not be in writing (as a prenuptial agreement is required to be), but may have been made orally by both parties. All that is required is that each have promised the other to marry the other at some future time (no date certain is required). Generally, promises made by—but not to—people who had not reached the age of majority could be broken at any time, without penalty, as could the promise made by a married person (e.g., conditional upon the death of the current spouse), so long as the other party knew that the person was married at the time. Similarly, an engagement between people who were not legally permitted to marry (e.g., because of consanguinity laws) was invalid.

Valid engagements could be broken without penalty by either party upon discovery of significant and material facts, such as previously unknown financial state (if completely concealed, rather than partially revealed; the Shell case in Georgia in 2008 permitted a jury award to the woman of $150,000 although the man breaking the engagement stated that he did so after paying $30,000 of her debts when he discovered she still owed more), bad character, fraud, too-close blood relations, or the absolute physical or mental incapacity of the betrothed. In South Africa, engagements could be dissolved by mutual agreement. Impotence, sterility, criminality, and alcoholism also formed valid reasons to end an engagement. Additionally, the person refusing to marry was unable to sue for breach of promise.

Some of the original theory behind this tort was based on the idea that a woman would be more likely to give up her virginity to a man if she had his promise to marry her. If he seduced her and subsequently refused marriage, her lack of virginity would make her future search for a suitable husband more difficult or even impossible.

However, in the 18th and 19th centuries, the main factors were compensation for the denial of the woman's expectations of becoming "established" in a household (supported by her husband's wealth) and possible damage to her social reputation, since there were a number of ways that the reputation of a young never-married woman of the genteel classes could be damaged by a broken engagement, or an apparent period of intimacy which did not end in a publicly announced engagement, even if few people seriously thought that she had lost her virginity. She might be viewed as having broken the code of maidenly modesty of the period by imprudently offering up her affections without having had a firm assurance of future marriage.

During the early 20th century, social standards changed so that a woman who had pre-marital sex was no longer considered to be "ruined". During that time, half of American women lost their virginity during their marriage engagements. Compensation was based on emotional distress and the woman's reduced opportunity for a future marriage. Damages were greatly increased if the couple had engaged in pre-marital sexual intercourse.

== Laws in different countries ==
=== Canada ===
In Canada, the common law action has been abolished in some provinces by legislation. For example, in Saskatchewan, the action for breach of promise was formally abolished by legislation in 2010.

=== England and Wales ===
In England and Wales until 1970 a woman whose fiancé broke off their engagement could sue him for breach of promise, whilst a woman was permitted to change her mind without penalty. The last prominent case was in 1969, when Eva Haraldsted sued George Best, a footballer, for breach of promise. However, the case never reached trial; instead, Haraldsted received a settlement of £500. England and Wales undertook legal reforms in 1970 that generally made property disputes related to engagements to be handled like property disputes between married couples.

On 1 January 1971 the tort was abolished in England and Wales by section 1 of the Law Reform (Miscellaneous Provisions) Act 1970.

=== Hong Kong ===
In Hong Kong, similar to the situation in England and Wales, engagements to marry are not enforceable at law by legislation, damages for distress caused and reliance on the breach of promise are claimable, if the plaintiff suffers sufficiently serious consequences in light of the specific circumstances, for instance in Cheung Suk Man v So Shek Keung [1965] HKLR 485.

=== India ===
In 2019, the Supreme Court of India ruled that sex on false promise of marriage constitutes rape.

=== United States ===
The first known lawsuit for breach of promise in colonial America and the first in which the defendant was a woman was Cecily Jordan v. Greville Pooley. This case was tried in the chambers of the Virginia Company and never went to a civil court, as the plaintiff withdrew his complaint. The first successful case was Stretch v Parker in 1639.

In 1915, Louis A. Merrilat, an American football end and military officer active in the early 20th century, was sued by Helen Van Ness for breach of promise after breaking off an engagement. Merrilat hired the noted Chicago attorney Clarence Darrow to defend him against the charges, which were eventually dismissed.

In the United States, most states repealed breach-of-promise laws or limited them, beginning in 1935. Partly as a result, expensive diamond engagement rings, previously uncommon, began to become commonplace, and formed a sort of financial security for the woman. About one-half of U.S. states still permit such lawsuits, according to the National Paralegal College. Examples of such suits include a jury award of $150,000 in the 2008 Shell case in Georgia, and $130,000 in a North Carolina jury trial December 17, 2010, in the case of Dellinger v. Barnes (No. 08 CVS 1006). Laws vary by state. In Illinois, for example, documented wedding expenses can be recovered, but damages for emotional distress are prohibited, and notice of an intent to sue must be provided within three months of the engagement being dissolved.

== Determining damages ==
Damages were generally permitted for expenses incurred on the expectation of a marriage, such as property transferred or wedding expenses. In some jurisdictions, emotional distress, loss of social standing, and loss of virginity were also possible sources of damages.

Some countries also allowed the woman to sue for loss of future income, that is, for money that she would have had, if her very wealthy fiancé had not broken off the engagement. In 20th-century reforms, this was generally abolished over fears of gold digging.

One challenge in settling disputes for breach of promise was determining whether a gift made during the engagement was an absolute gift—one given permanently, with no strings attached—or a conditional gift, given in the expectation of the marriage taking place. If an engagement gift was given on a holiday, such as Valentine's Day or Christmas, the gift could be considered to be non-contingent, and given partially for reasons other than marriage, and thus does not have to be returned. Christmas presents are generally taken to be absolute gifts, and thus cannot be recovered if the engagement dissolves, but engagement rings are generally taken to be conditional gifts, at least under most circumstances, which means that they must be returned if the recipient no longer chooses to go through with the marriage. Whether an engagement ring must be returned if the giver breaks off the engagement varies.

== Similar actions in law ==
Criminal conversation was a similar tort, arising from adultery, in which a married person could sue the person with whom his or her spouse had engaged in adultery. Alienation of affections was another similar tort against a third party who encouraged the adultery, or who was otherwise responsible for the breakdown of the marriage.

=== Non-common-law jurisdictions ===
France nominally did not permit breach of promise actions, holding that marriage must involve free consent from both parties, and if the engagement is legally binding, then free consent is not possible. However, any party may sue for losses as a result of improper behavior by an engaged person.

In Scots law before 1812, damages were limited only to actual financial losses.

After World War II, German, Spanish, and Italian law allowed for the recovery of actual damages incurred as a result of a failed engagement.

== In popular culture ==
=== Literature ===
The social damage from receiving attention from a man is discussed in a passage from the 1801 novel Belinda by Maria Edgeworth, where an older woman is urging Miss Belinda Portman to give a suitor more time to attach her affections, though Belinda is worried that even by just passively accepting his attentions for a certain time, she might find herself "entangled, so as not to be able to retract", even "if it should not be in my power to love him at last":

... after a certain time—after the world suspects that two people are engaged to each other, it is scarcely possible for the woman to recede: when they come within a certain distance, they are pressed to unite, by the irresistible force of external circumstances. A woman is too often reduced to this dilemma: either she must marry a man she does not love, or she must be blamed by the world—either she must sacrifice a portion of her reputation, or the whole of her happiness. ... A young woman is not in this respect allowed sufficient time for freedom of deliberation.

Breach-of-promise actions were part of the standard stock-in-trade of comic writers of the 19th century (such as Charles Dickens in Pickwick Papers, or Gilbert and Sullivan in Trial by Jury) and in the 20th century as a frequent plot device by P. G. Wodehouse, but most middle- and upper-class families were reluctant to use them except in rather extreme circumstances (such as when a daughter became pregnant by a man who then refused to marry her), since they led to wide publicity being given to a scrutiny of personal concerns, something which was strongly repugnant to the family feeling of the period (especially where young women were concerned).

=== Media ===
Trial by Jury is a comic opera by Gilbert and Sullivan that premiered in London in 1875; it satirically depicts a trial for breach of promise. The one-act opera was the first in a series of 13 collaborations among librettist W. S. Gilbert, composer Arthur Sullivan, and impresario Richard D'Oyly Carte. It continues to be performed regularly in the 21st century.

In the 1935 film We're in the Money, Joan Blondell and Glenda Farrell play two process servers trying to serve a rich playboy, Ross Alexander, with a breach of promise suit.

At the start of the 1946 film Easy to Wed, newspaperman Warren Haggerty (Keenan Wynn) has abandoned his planned wedding to Gladys Benson (Lucille Ball) for the umpteenth time when his paper is faced with a libel suit. When Benson storms in to confront him, she threatens him with a breach of promise suit, to which Haggerty replies "Breach of promise suits have been outlawed!"

The episode "A Woman's Privilege" of the featurette series The Scales of Justice recounts the unusual case of a man who sues a woman for breach of promise following a cruise ship romance engagement.

In the film A Hard Day's Night (1964), Paul McCartney's (fictional) grandfather is pursued by young women who want to sue him for breach of promise.

In the 1998 series Berkeley Square (set in 1902), Captain Mason is forbidden from marrying Isobelle by her chaperone Aunt Effie due to his outstanding bills and social indiscretion. He threatens to sue for breach of promise, forcing Effie to accept their engagement to avoid family scandal.

In season 8 of the TV show Frasier, Donny files a suit against Daphne for running away with Niles on the day of their wedding.

== See also ==
- Seduction (tort)
- Wreath money
