= Malaysia Internet Blackout Day (2012) =

Internet protest in Malaysia

Malaysia Internet Blackout Day on 14 August 2012, was a series of coordinated protests occurred against a proposed laws in amendment of the Section 114A is the second of two amendments made to Malaysia's Evidence Act 1950 by the Centre for Independent Journalism (CIJ) member of IFEX and SEAPA, initiative, this campaigning against the newly introduced Section 114A to the Evidence Act 1950—Malaysia Internet Blackout Day—by the protesters also placed their poster in their sites based on content is gaining momentum and has received more endorsements from prominent websites, netizens, and politicians were reported globally.

The amendment of section 114A "makes individuals and those who administer, operate or provide spaces for online community forums, blogging, and hosting services, liable for content published through its services". This enables law enforcement officials to hold publishers of websites accountable for seditious, defamatory, or libelous postings even if they are not the actual authors of the content.

Internet Blackout Day was also supported by media sites FreeMalaysiaToday, Malaysiakini, Digital News Asia, The Nut Graph, BFM 89.9, Merdeka Review, and party organ news sites Harakah Daily and Keadilan Daily.

== Background to the campaign ==
The CIJ also organised a public forum on 12 June 2012, entitled ‘Section 114A Evidence Act: Crime-busting or Online Control?’ with lawyer Foong Cheng Leong, online activist Jac SM Kee, and tech experts A. Asohan and Jeff Sandhu to discuss about the repercussions of the amendment.

On 11 August 2012, the CIJ, along with the National Young Lawyers Committee, and Pusat Rakyat LoyarBurok co-hosted a discussion on legal implications of Section 114A with lawyers K. Shanmuga, Faisal Moideen, and Foong Cheng Leong and Member of Parliament and Deputy Higher Education Minister Saifuddin Abdullah.
