= Transactional sex =

Physical, emotionally intimate relationships involving gifts, pay, or other services

Transactional sex refers to sexual relationships where the giving or receiving of gifts, money, services, or material items is an important factor. The participants do not necessarily frame themselves in terms of prostitutes or clients, but often as partners, or as sugar babies, daddies or mommies. Those offering sexual services (which can include sex) may or may not feel affection for their partners.

Transactional sex is a superset of sex work, in that the exchange of monetary reward for sex includes a broader set of (usually non-marital) obligations that do not necessarily involve a predetermined payment or gift, but where there is a definite motivation to benefit materially from the sexual exchange.

== Currencies ==
=== Alcohol ===
Alcohol has been used as a currency for transactional sex in South Africa and Uganda.

=== Basic Needs ===
This form of transactional sex is most commonly referred to as survival sex.

=== Cash ===
Cash remains to be the most common currency in transactional sex worldwide.

=== Cryptocurrency ===
Since the 2018 passage of FOSTA-SESTA, up to a third of sex workers in the United States have turned into cryptocurrencies due to its anonymity, ability to avoid chargebacks, and being able to bypass banking platforms.

== See also ==
- Casting couch
- Enjo kōsai
- Girlfriend experience
- Hypergamy
- Kept woman
- Prostitution among animals
- Sex for fish
- Sugar baby
- Treating (dating)
