= Alienation of affections =

Legal term whereby a third-party is blamed for the breakdown of a personal relationship

Alienation of affections (sometimes called homewrecker law) is a common law tort in some jurisdictions, wherein a civil lawsuit action is brought by a spouse against a third party alleged to be responsible for damaging the marriage, most often referring to one that has ended in divorce. The defendant in an alienation of affections suit is typically an adulterous spouse's lover, although family members, counselors, and therapists or clergy members who have advised a spouse to seek divorce have also been sued for alienation of affections.

The tort of alienation of affections often overlaps with another "heart balm" tort: criminal conversation. Alienation of affections has similarity with the tort of tortious interference, where a third party can be held liable for interfering with the contractual relationship between two parties.

== Legal requirements ==
An action for alienation of affection does not require proof of extramarital sex. An alienation claim is difficult to establish because it comprises several elements and there are several defenses.

To succeed on an alienation claim, the plaintiff has to show the following elements:

1. the marriage entailed love between the spouses in some degree;
2. the spousal love was alienated;
3. the defendant's malicious conduct contributed to or caused the loss of affection.

It is not necessary to show that the defendant set out to destroy the marital relationship, but only that he or she intentionally engaged in acts which would foreseeably impact the marriage.

Thus, the defendant has a defense against an alienation claim where it can be shown that he or she did not know that the object of his or her affections was in fact married. It is not a defense that the guilty spouse consented to the defendant's conduct, but it might be a defense that the defendant was not the active and aggressive seducer.

If the defendant's conduct was somehow inadvertent, the plaintiff would be unable to show intentional or malicious action. But prior marital problems do not establish a defense unless such unhappiness had reached a level of negating love between the spouses.

== Australia ==
Alienation of affection actions in Australia stopped being good law since 1975, with the passing of the Family Law Act 1975. In the new system, outlined by the statute, there exists a fault-less ground of divorce, and that is irretrievable breakdown of a marriage, which is evidenced by 12 months of separation. Spousal behaviour though, can be a consideration a court may take into account during a property settlement.

== Canada ==
The Supreme Court of Canada held that alienation of affection and the related tort cause of action for "criminal conversation" was not available as a cause of action in the year 1962 in the case of Kungl v. Schiefer, S.C.R. 443. The basis for the claim by the party suing in an Ontario case had been that Canada incorporated by reference the law of England as of the year 1792, but the Supreme Court of Canada held that England did not recognize that tort in the year 1792, so it was not a part of the law of Canada.

== United States ==
As of 2016, alienation of affections was recognized in six United States jurisdictions: Hawaii, North Carolina, Mississippi, New Mexico, South Dakota, and Utah. The U.S. Supreme Court has declined to consider the constitutionality of such torts by writ of certiorari, notwithstanding academic commentary suggesting that these torts are unconstitutional under the United States Constitution and relevant modern precedents decided based upon it, including Obergefell v. Hodges, that struck down laws prohibiting same sex marriage in the United States. The U.S. Supreme Court has addressed the tort in several cases that did not question its constitutionality, including U.S. v. Kaiser, 363 U.S. 299, 310 (1960) (dissenting opinion) (tax treatment of damages awards); Lykes v. U.S., 343 U.S. 118, 126 (1952) (tax deductions for litigation costs); Sherrer v. Sherrer, 334 U.S. 343, 373 (1948) (dissenting opinion) (full faith and credit afforded to divorce judgments); Shepard v. United States, 290 U.S. 96, 105 (1933) (admissibility of evidence); Tinker v. Colwell, 193 U.S. 473, 474 (1904) (availability of discharge of damages awards in bankruptcy); Waldron v. Waldron, 156 U.S. 361, 362–64 (1895) (preservation of objections to evidence when transcripts from a related proceeding are introduced). The U.S. Supreme Court has never granted certiorari on the constitutionality of the tort.

The tort of alienation of affection was inherited as part of the common law. The law was codified in some states, the first one being New York with legislation in 1864, and similar legislation existed in many U.S. states in the late 19th and early 20th centuries.

Since 1935, this tort has been abolished in 42 states. Most states have abolished the action by legislation, but some came to an end by judicial review.

For example, in 1927, actions for alienation of affection were abolished in Louisiana as a result of Moulin v. Monteleone, 165 La. 169, 115 So. 447. See also South Carolina case Russo v. Sutton, 422 SE 2d 750 (1992), abolishing the heart balm action for alienation of affection.

=== Hawaii ===
In Hawaii, the plaintiff has to prove his spouse did not seek the defendant, and has to show a lack of any marital fault.

=== Mississippi ===
In 2007, the Mississippi Supreme Court, in Fitch v. Valentine, in which the cheated husband, Johnny Valentine, received $750,000, upheld the constitutionality of the state's alienation of affection law. Among the notable cases is Pickering v. Pickering, in which the wife of former U.S. Congressman Chip Pickering sued his college sweetheart Elizabeth Creekmore Byrd for alienation of affection, also claiming that Pickering turned down Mississippi Gov. Haley Barbour's 2007 offer of former Sen. Trent Lott's Senate seat so that Pickering could divorce her and he and the defendant could be together.

=== New Mexico ===
The law was confirmed in 1999 by the New Mexico Supreme Court, although the field was heavily restricted, the courts viewing this cause of action with disfavor.

=== North Carolina ===
Alienation of affection and criminal conversation lawsuits are allowed in North Carolina. It is estimated that over 200 alienation of affection cases are filed in North Carolina each year.

Million-dollar verdicts have not been uncommon in North Carolina for alienation of affection and emotional distress. In March 2010, a wife won a $9 million suit against her husband's mistress. A Mecklenburg County jury awarded $1.4 million in May 2001 to a former wrestling coach against P, after the coach's wife left him for P (the jury verdict was later reduced by the North Carolina Court of Appeals as excessive). A year 2000 verdict of $86,250 for alienation of affections and $15,000 for criminal conversation in the case of Pharr v. Beck, from Burke county was upheld on appeal. In 1997, in the case of Hutelmyer v. Cox, the Plaintiff wife was awarded $1 million against her husband's secretary who "dressed sexy at work" and had an affair with him destroying their marriage. In 2011, Betty Devin was ordered to pay $30 million to Carol Puryear for alienating Donald Puryear from her, causing their divorce.

In North Carolina, such lawsuits can be filed only for conduct prior to a separation; although, prior to changes in the law which went into effect in October 2009, the tort of criminal conversion applied to post-separation conduct as well.

The North Carolina legislature has repeatedly had bills to abolish the tort introduced, and declined to do so. In 2009, the General Assembly approved legislation which placed some additional limits on such lawsuits. The bill was signed into law by Governor Bev Perdue on August 3, 2009, and is codified under Chapter 52 of the North Carolina General Statutes:

§ 52-13. Procedures in causes of action for alienation of affection and criminal conversation.

(a) No act of the defendant shall give rise to a cause of action for alienation of affection or criminal conversation that occurs after the plaintiff and the plaintiff's spouse physically separate with the intent of either the plaintiff or plaintiff's spouse that the physical separation remain permanent.

(b) An action for alienation of affection or criminal conversation shall not be commenced more than three years from the last act of the defendant giving rise to the cause of action.

(c) A person may commence a cause of action for alienation of affection or criminal conversation against a natural person only.

An alienation of affections suit may be brought against an employer if one of these three circumstances is evident.

1. The employer authorized the employee's acts;
2. The employee's acts were committed within the scope of his employment and in furtherance of the employer's business; or
3. The employer ratifies the employee's acts.

Each of the three limitations arose from a North Carolina legal case involving the tort.

1. In Jones v. Skelly, N.C.App. 2009, the North Carolina Court of Appeals had held that the tort applies even to legally separated spouses.
2. In Mesenheimer v. Burris, N.C. 2006, the North Carolina Supreme Court held that the statute of limitation commences when the affair should have been discovered rather than when it occurred.
3. In Smith v. Lee, 2007 U.S. Dist. LEXIS 78987, the Federal District Court for the Western District of North Carolina noted that the question of whether an employer could be held liable for an affair conducted by an employee (e.g. while on a business trip for the employer) was still unsettled in North Carolina.

There is often confusion over where an employee's "scope of employment" ends. An example of this would be a minister having sex with a person that has been receiving counseling services from that minister. In theory the minister is acting within the scope of employment because it is their duty to provide these counseling services and it is through these services that they gain access to the victim.

In 2014, Resident Superior Court Judge John O. Craig dismissed the case of Rothrock v. Cooke, ruling that the state's criminal conversion and alienation of affection laws were unconstitutional, infringing up on 1st and 14th amendment rights in the U.S. Constitution. That case was not appealed. In 2017, the North Carolina Court of Appeals, in a different case, ruled that the common law cause of action of alienation of affection was not facially invalid under the First and Fourteenth Amendments.

In 2017, the North Carolina Court of Appeals ruled in a 3–0 decision to uphold the constitutionality of the tort (Malecek v. Williams 807 S.E.2d 574).

=== South Dakota ===
In 2002 the law was reworded to be gender-neutral, allowing wives to sue another woman.

A man was awarded $950,000, later reduced to $400,000, in a 2002 case in which a South Dakota jury ruled that an orthopedic surgeon from Las Vegas had enticed the man's wife into an affair and had broken up their marriage.

On 2007 it was ruled defenders in cases of alienation of affection were not entitled to be covered by their insurances, as this is an intentional tort.

Punitive damages are limited to 20% of the defendant's worth.

=== Utah ===
Both in 1983 and eight years later in 1991, the Utah Supreme Court confirmed the legality of such claims, although Justice Christine M. Durham dissented in both cases, describing alienation of affection as "an anachronistic holdover from a bygone era, which modern rationalizations have failed to justify." However, in the 1991 ruling, they disallowed criminal conversation claims The same court confirmed alienation of affections as a cause of action in 2002.

Among the notables cases were Jason Miles Williams, who attempted several times to sue the Fundamentalist Church of Jesus Christ of Latter-Day Saints leadership for causing his divorce by saying his wife would be damned if she did not divorce and Janice Peck suing the Utah Division of Wildlife Resources after her husband left her for his new wife he met while posing as a couple to track poachers.
