= LGBTQ people in prison =

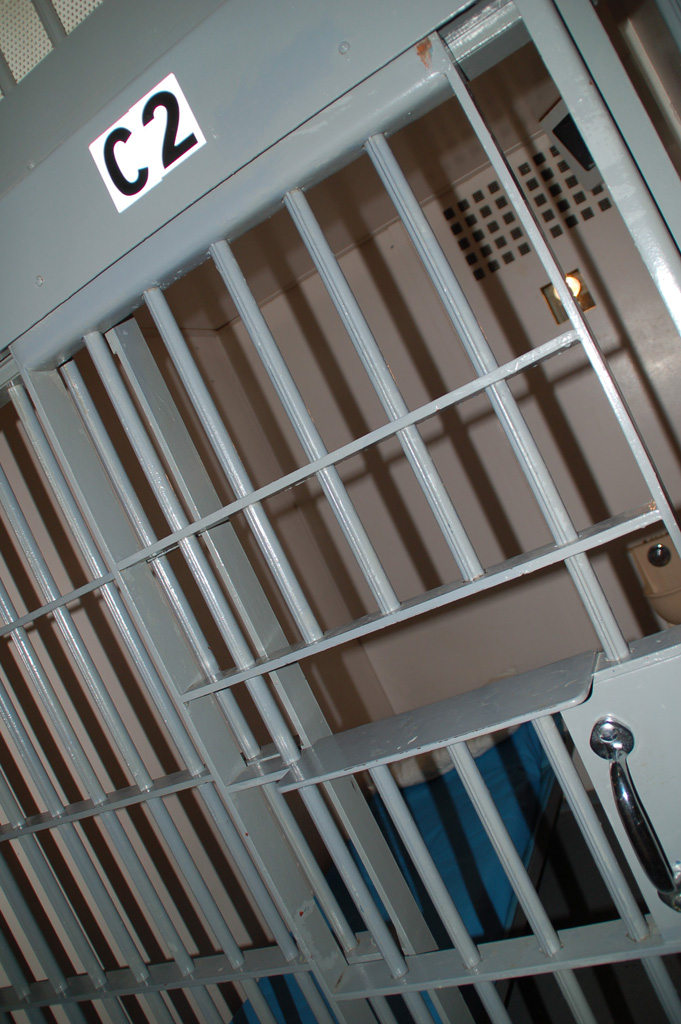
In some prisons, the only protective custody available to lesbian, gay, bisexual, and transgender people is segregated isolation.

Lesbian, gay, bisexual, transgender and queer (LGBTQ) people in prison face difficulties which non-LGBTQ prisoners and non-incarcerated LGBTQ people do not. LGBTQ prisoners have been identified as having an increased vulnerability to sexual assault, other kinds of violence, and trouble accessing necessary medical care. While much of the available data on LGBTQ inmates comes from the United States, Amnesty International maintains records of known incidents internationally in which LGBTQ prisoners and those perceived to be lesbian, gay, bisexual or transgender have suffered torture, ill-treatment and violence at the hands of fellow inmates as well as prison officials.

One US-based human rights organization, Just Detention International, describes LGBTQ inmates as "among the most vulnerable in the prison population." In California prisons, two-thirds of LGBTQ people report that they were assaulted while incarcerated. The vulnerability of LGBTQ prisoners has led some prisons to separate them from other prisoners.

Historically, LGBTQ people in the United States have been socially and economically vulnerable due to their queer status. Policy, policing and the criminal justice system have historically perpetrated violence upon marginalized populations, like the queer community. This along with criminalizing same sex behaviors have created a disproportionate population of LGBTQ people in US-based prisons.

== Rates of imprisonment ==
=== United States ===
In the United States, LGBTQ individuals are incarcerated at a higher rate than the general population. An analysis of data collected between 2011 and 2012 found that same-sex attracted adults were incarcerated at a rate of 1,882 per 100,000, more than triple the national average, with the discrepancy largely driven by a large overrepresentation of lesbian and bisexual women.

This overrepresentation of LGBTQ people in incarceration is part of the broader trend of LGBTQ overrepresentation in all stages of the criminal justice system (arrest, incarceration, parole, etc.). LGBT offenders have been little studied, so the causes of the discrepancy are poorly understood. LGBT people are more likely to live in poverty, which may contribute to the higher rate of criminal offending. It has also been attributed to minority stress.

==== Lesbians and bisexual women ====
Lesbian and bisexual women are overrepresented in incarceration. The rate of lesbian or bisexual identification among incarcerated women in the U.S. (42.1% in prisons and 35.7% in jails) is around 8 to 10 times higher than the national baseline (3.4%). Similar patterns have been observed among Australian prisoners.

Two conceptual frameworks are used to understand the over-representation of sexual minority women in prison: that women become bisexual or lesbian in prison, and that sexual minority women are more likely to go to prison in the first place. Supporting the first framework, some incarcerated women identify as "gate gays," meaning that they are gay while inside the prison's gates, but return to a straight identity upon release. However, the majority of women who have sex with women in prison engaged in same-sex sexual activity before incarceration. In one survey of female prisoners in Queensland, just 25% of those who had a same-sex sexual relationship while in prison said it was their first time with another woman.

==== Gay and bisexual men ====
Some studies have indicated that the rate of gay and bisexual men in the prison and jail population in the U.S. (5.5% in prison and 3.3% in jail) is close to the national rate (3.6%). Other studies argue that gay and bisexual men, also including men who have sex with men (MSM), are almost twice as likely to be incarcerated than heterosexual men (9.3% in prisons and 6.2% in jails). This has been attributed to minority stress and social exclusion from family and community on gay and bisexual men, which makes financial support more difficult.

==== Transgender incarceration ====
Compared to sexual orientation, less data is available about transgender people in the criminal justice system.

In 2011, the National Transgender Discrimination Survey found that 35% of black transgender Americans believe that they have been incarcerated simply due to perceived anti-trans bias, compared to 4% of white transgender respondents. Black transgender people had higher rates of experiences of incarceration in general (47% compared to 12% of white transgender people). It also found that black trans women were sexually assaulted in jail at a rate of 38%, compared to 12% of white trans women prisoners. As of 2015, the National Center for Transgender Equality estimated that one in six transgender individuals in the United States has been incarcerated in their lifetime, compared to the Bureau of Justice Statistics rate of one in twenty for the general population. Trans women and black transgender people are particularly likely to be incarcerated, with 21% and 47% having ever been incarcerated respectively.

== Coming out ==
In men's prisons, inmates who are known or perceived as gay or effeminate face "a very high risk of sexual abuse". Therefore, many gay, bisexual or transgender inmates - including those who were openly gay outside of prison - attempt to hide their sexual identities.

The Los Angeles County Men's jail segregates openly gay and transgender inmates, however, only if they are openly gay and if the staff that is inspecting them perceives them to be gay or trans enough for segregation. Even through attempts from gay men and trans women trying to seek a safer place, the jail only segregates those that fit into their definition of gay and trans, often only accepting those they deem vulnerable enough.

LGBTQ individuals are often subject to physical violence when they attempt to resist sexual abuse or sexual degradation, and can be targeted due to perceived femininity as well as if their sexual orientation is known. These individuals can be targeted because of their sexuality and attitudes towards LGBTQ people. In some instances, LGBTQ prisoners who are outed have been punished for attempting to repel an alleged aggressor, sometimes ending up in solitary confinement.

Denial of access to surgical sex reassignment on the grounds of unstable or criminal behavior condemns those who are transgender, resulting in potential continuing identity confusion, low self-esteem, drug and alcohol abuse, self-mutilation and acting out behavior which further facilitates the vicious cycle of chronic dysfunction, perpetuating criminal behavior.

== Transgender issues ==
The Standard Minimum Rules for the Treatment of Prisoners, adopted by the United Nations General Assembly in 2015, states that “Men and women shall so far as possible be detained in separate institutions; in an institution which receives both men and women, the whole of the premises allocated to women shall be entirely separate.” However, in 2024, the European Committee for the Prevention of Torture recommended that transgender people should be housed in prisons corresponding to their self-identified gender, subject to individualised assessments.

=== Australia ===
The bill mentioned in "Transgender Prisoners: A Critical Analysis of Queensland Corrective Services' New Procedure" has shown to be largely ineffective. New legislation has been passed (Inspector of Detention Services Act 2022 (IDS)), now fully in force in 2023. In accordance with the Act, new "Inspection standards for prisons and youth detention centres" have been released. These new standards have included and are addressing shortcomings of previous legislation and standards with regards to transgender and intersex prisoners (now generally to be admitted to the facilities corresponding to a transgender person's lived or experienced gender), but may not go far enough, as there is still an element of discretion by prison staff during the admission procedure, and only transgender people who have undergone sexual reassignment surgery are excluded from this process.

=== Brazil ===
Studies point that external memories from society heavily impact LGBT lives, especially from travestis and transgender people, who are more often at social vulnerability or suscetible to prostitution, and internal sense of identity is many times fragmented to adapt into social environment during rehabilitation.

=== Canada ===
When Bill C-16, a bill that prevented discrimination based on gender identity, was passed in Canada, transgender prisoners were to be placed in facilities based on their gender identity. Additionally, Prime Minister Justin Trudeau promised to "look at" transgender prison assignment to ensure that these prisoners ended up in the facilities that matched their gender identity. Further, transgender prisoners are to be considered for sex-reassignment surgery if they are imprisoned for more than twelve continuous months. A 2022 study on correctional officers in Nova Scotia (but not prisoners) concluded that the correctional officers were "generally mindful of issues pertaining to the safety and security of trans prisoners, usually espouse open-mindedness", however that some officers raised concerns with respect to prisoners who present a safety risk to other prisoners. A 2022 news report from CTV alleged that gender diverse prisoners face a pattern of abuse and discrimination in Canadian jails and that they are more likely to be victims of sexual assault than other prisoners. Specifically, the report alleges that procedures that are in place to protect gender diverse individuals are not always followed by prison staff.

=== England & Wales ===
Guidance issued in 2011 stated that trans men and women who had changed their birth certificates and legal genders before imprisonment should be placed in the men's and women's estates respectively, with the exception where placing a trans woman in the women's estate would pose a security risk to the other female prisoners.

The policy was softened further due to the high-profile case of Tara Hudson, a young trans woman who had been imprisoned in HMP Bristol (a men's prison) in 2015 for headbutting a barman. Hudson had been on estrogenising hormone replacement therapy since her teens, but did not have a gender recognition certificate. Her appearance was very conventionally feminine, which is thought to have helped her cause with the public. A campaign by her family and the public resulted in 150,000 people signing a petition calling for Hudson's transferral to a women's prison and to put pressure on the Ministry of Justice to do so. After seven days Hudson was transferred to HMP Eastwood Park (a women's prison).

From 2016, transgender men and women without legal gender recognition had the right to apply to a Local Transgender Case Board, where officials would evaluate requests to be moved to a different estate on a case-by-case basis. Nonbinary people were not included in the guidance. The decisions would be based on the degree of physical transition, how long the prisoner had lived in their acquired gender and their offending history.

In 2019, the Ministry of Justice (United Kingdom) published data on transgender incarceration in England and Wales: there were 163 transgender prisoners (up from 139 reported in 2018), with 62 of the 121 jails housing at least one transgender prisoner. Prisoners are included in the data if they are being considered by a transgender case board, and known to be living in or presenting as a gender different from their sex assigned at birth. These figures may be underestimates in part because they do not include prisoners holding Gender Recognition Certificates under the Gender Recognition Act 2004.

Transgender prisoners in England and Wales (2019)
In	By	Male	Female	No response	Total
Men's prisons	legal gender	125	2	2	129
Men's prisons	self-identified gender	0	119	10	129
Women's prisons	legal gender	4	30	0	34
Women's prisons	self-identified gender	20	11	3	34

In 2022, there were 230 transgender prisoners, increasing from 197 in 2021. In August 2022, a statement was issued by the Ministry of Justice under Dominic Raab, that trans prisoners in England and Wales would be sent to prisons based on their genitalia.

As of 2024, 3% of the prison system declares a non-heterosexual sexual orientation.

As of 2021, just 0.2% of the prison population is trans. Shon Faye notes in The Transgender Issue that the actual number of trans inmates is likely to be higher than this due to the exclusion from this number of trans people who have changed their legal gender and birth certificate, and that the number is reliant on trans prisoners presenting themselves to prison authorities as trans. As of 2023, 83% of transgender prisoners reported their legal gender as male, and only 10 prisoners had a Gender Recognition Certificate

=== Italy ===
In 2010, it was reported that Italy was to open its first transgender prison at Pozzale, a decision welcomed by gay rights groups. As of 2013, the prison has not been created yet.

=== Japan ===
One in 13 Japanese people identify as LGBT, or about 7.6% of the population. Japan does not criminalize same-sex sexual acts, and transgender people are able to change their gender through the Family Registry, if certain conditions are met. However, these conditions include requiring "gender confirmation surgery, being over 20 years old, being unmarried while applying to legally change one's gender, having no minor children, and being deprived of their reproductive organ or reproductive ability" according to Amnesty International. If a person has not legally registered to change their gender before being incarcerated, they will be sent to a prison that matches their gender assignment at birth. Additionally, Japanese prisons are not required to provide hormone therapy for transgender inmates; since the medication is not to treat a disease, the prisons are not required by law to treat them. According to Amnesty International, "Japan's Act on Penal Detention Facilities and Treatment of Inmates and Detainees (Act on Penal Detention) does not have specific clauses that cover the treatment of detainees based on sexual orientation or gender identity". However, Article 34.2 of Act on Penal Detention requires that female prison officers examine female detainees, and the practice is also extended to transgender women regardless of their status with gender confirmation surgery or not.

=== Scotland ===
In June 2026, a judge ruled that prison guidance which allowed some transgender prisoners to be held in jails matching their gender identity was unlawful and that sex segregation in prisons had to be based on biological sex. Following this ruling, it was confirmed in November 2026 that there were no biological males in women's prisons Prior to this, it was reported in April 2026 that there were just two trans woman being held in women's prisons at the time that one of them was charged with committing sexual assault within a women’s prison.

=== United States ===
==== Housing ====
Most U.S. prisons have a policy of housing prisoners according to their sex as assigned at birth or genital configuration (e.g. post-op trans women would be placed in women's prisons), regardless of their current appearance or gender identity, leaving them or others vulnerable to potential violence and sexual assault. Transgender women with breasts may be locked up with men, leaving them vulnerable to violence and sexual assault, as occurred with the case of Dee Farmer, a pre-operative transgender woman with breast implants, who was raped and contracted HIV when she was housed in a men's prison. Transgender men housed in women's prisons also face abuse, often more from guards than other inmates.

U.S. prisons generally view gender and sex as binary; this includes prison dress codes, which prevent gender-nonconforming individuals from dressing to match their gender identity. There is often little gender-confirming healthcare provided. While transgender prisoners used to be permitted to be housed according to the gender with which they identify, this rule was reversed, as announced by the U.S. Bureau of Prisons in May 2018. Now, housing is once again to be determined by assigned sex at birth.

In 2020, an article posted by NBC news has shared information about the struggles transgender people are facing when being housed. The Federal State law states that each case is evaluated individually, however most cases often get denied and are housed with their gender assigned at birth. In the US, there has been a record of 15 cases of transgender people getting housed in the correct facility. People that are transgender have reported feeling like they can not be their true identity when being housed in the wrong gender facility. Concerns that arise when they are housed in the wrong facility are more susceptible to sexual assault. When these assaults are reported the guards often dismiss these reports. Because of this, the majority of reports are not being reported.

The New York State prison system (DOCCS) has revised policies in recent years to reflect transgender and nonbinary people's gender identities. In January 2022, New York Governor Kathy Hochul directed the prison administrators to let transgender people choose to be housed in a men's or women's facility, and to give access to appropriate medical and mental health care. In 2019, New York DOCCS allowed the first transgender woman to transfer, prior to gender reassignment surgery, from a men's to a women's prison.

==== Gender-affirming care ====
In February 2026, the Federal Bureau of Prisons adopted a new policy limiting access to gender-affirming care for incarcerated transgender individuals. The policy prohibits gender-affirming surgeries, bars new hormone prescriptions for gender dysphoria, and requires individuals currently receiving hormone therapy to taper off treatment, with limited adjustments for severe withdrawal effects. It also restricts access to clothing and commissary items associated with a person's gender identity. Under the policy, treatment for gender dysphoria will primarily consist of psychotherapy and psychiatric medications. The changes align with a prior executive order directing that federal funds not be used for medical procedures or treatments intended to align an inmate's appearance with that of the opposite sex.

=== Vietnam ===
In 2015, the National Assembly of Vietnam passed a law which allows transgender people who have undergone sex reassignment surgery to register under their preferred gender. Further discussion on the treatment of LGBTQ+ people has been initiated in many later meetings of the National Assembly, in which representatives suggested that homosexual and transgender inmates be placed in different places than others. These suggestions were written into law in the 2019 Criminal Code of Vietnam, which went into effect on January 1, 2020. Many attorneys and advocacy groups have praised this as a new step towards ensuring the rights of Vietnamese trans people, while others point out that the law needs amendments that clearly define what these separate areas are like.

According to the new Criminal Code, beside groups like minors, foreigners, and mothers who carry their children of under 36 months into jail along with them, "inmates that are homosexual, transgender or people of unidentified gender can be imprisoned separately." Due to the lack of coverage regarding non-binary people in Vietnam, the phrase "people of unidentified gender" is best understood as trans men or trans women who have not undergone sex reassignment surgery, while "transgender" refers to those who have.

== Conjugal visits ==
In jurisdictions where there is some form of recognition of same-sex relationships, prisoners may be permitted conjugal visits with a same-sex partner. (Note: Only countries where same-sex conjugal visitation rights have been specifically addressed in law are included on this list.)

=== Same-sex conjugal visitation by country ===
==== Argentina ====
Opposite-sex conjugal visits have long been permitted, but a case in the central province of Córdoba has authorized same-sex conjugal visits as well. The ruling came after an inmate was twice punished with solitary confinement for having sex with his visiting partner in his cell. The inmate brought a lawsuit on the basis of a law that obliges authorities to "guarantee (the availability of) intimate relations for prisoners with their spouses or, alternatively, with their (partners)."

==== Australia ====
In Australia, conjugal visits are only permitted in the Australian Capital Territory and Victoria. This includes visits by partners of the same-sex, provided they are not also incarcerated. Conjugal visits of any type are not allowed in New South Wales, Queensland, South Australia, Tasmania, Western Australia and the Northern Territory.

==== Belgium ====
All inmates are entitled to conjugal visitation as same-sex couples.

==== Brazil ====
From February 2015, inmates who register their same sex partner have the right to conjugal visitations in all of Brazil's jails. This decision was reached by the National Criminal and Penitentiary Council. The conjugal visit must be guaranteed at least once a month and cannot be prohibited or suspended as a disciplinary measure with the exception of certain cases where violations being restricted are linked to the improper use of conjugal visitations.

==== Caribbean region ====
Conjugal visits are not permitted in any countries in the Caribbean region. Marcus Day, adviser to the Association of Caribbean Heads of Corrections and Prison Services has urged the implementation of opposite-sex conjugal visitation for male inmates and the provision of condoms within prisons in an effort to stop the spread of HIV. Day attributes the spread of HIV/AIDS in prisons to "homosexual relationships among otherwise heterosexual men and homosexual rape," situations he said are rife in Caribbean prisons: "Allow men to have the women come and visit them in prison and have a private room where they can make love to each other and the desire to have same-sex relationships will be greatly reduced," claimed Day.

==== Colombia ====
On October 11, 2001, the Colombian Supreme Court issued a verdict in favour of the right to same-sex conjugal visits in a case brought by Alba Nelly Montoya, a lesbian in the Risaralda Women's Prison. This was not the first case regarding same-sex conjugal visitation in the country. Marta Alvarez, another lesbian inmate, had been campaigning since 1994 for the same right, and on October 1, 1999, her case became the first ever sexual orientation-related case presented before the Inter-American Commission on Human Rights. In her petition, Alvarez had argued that her rights to personal dignity, integrity, and equality were being infringed upon by the denial to allow her conjugal visits in prison, since the Colombian National Penitentiary and Prison Institute (INPEC) granted conjugal visitation rights in a discriminatory fashion to heterosexual men and women (the latter restricted to visits from husbands only), and denied this right to same-sex couples.

While the Colombian government admitted its failure to grant conjugal visitation to Alvarez constituted "inhuman and discriminatory" treatment, it continued to deny such visits, arguing reasons of security, discipline, and morality. Alvarez was also subjected to retaliatory disciplinary measures, including being transferred to a men's prison, which ceased following a domestic and international protest campaign.

==== Costa Rica ====
In August 2008, the Costa Rican Constitutional Tribunal rejected a man's appeal in a lawsuit against prison authorities who stopped his conjugal visits to his male partner, a current inmate, ruling that gay inmates do not have the right to conjugal visits. In 2011, the court rejected this ruling and now allows same-sex conjugal visits.

==== Israel ====
Gay prisoners in Israeli Prison System (IPS) are allowed conjugal visits with their partners under the same circumstances as heterosexual prisoners. This policy was revised in July 2013 under Association for Civil Rights in Israel chief legal attorney Dan Yakir challenged the lack of conjugal visits for same sex inmates since 2009.

==== Mexico ====
In July 2007 through the efforts of the country's National Human Rights Commission (CDHDF), the Mexico City prison system began allowing same-sex conjugal visits on the basis of a 2003 law which bans discrimination based on sexual orientation. The visitor is not required to be married to the inmate. This policy change applies to all Mexico City Prisons.

==== Russia ====
Same-sex long or official visits are prohibited, but short visits for friends can be organised if one is imprisoned in a so-called kolonija-poselenie. Official sex in prison is possible only during the 1–3 day long visit of a registered heterosexual spouse.

==== United Kingdom ====
Conjugal visits are not allowed to any prisoner regardless of sexual orientation, but home visits are.

==== United States ====
As of 2023, California, Connecticut, Washington and New York are the only U.S. states that allow conjugal visits. In June 2007, the California Department of Corrections announced it would allow same-sex conjugal visits. The policy was enacted to comply with a 2005 state law requiring state agencies to give the same rights to domestic partners that heterosexual couples receive. The new rules allow for visits only by registered married same sex couples or domestic partners who are not themselves incarcerated. Further, the same sex marriage or domestic partnership must have been established before the prisoner was incarcerated. In April 2011, New York adopted to allow conjugal visits for currently married, or civil-union spouses same-sex partners.

== Healthcare among LGBTQ prisoners by country ==
=== United States ===
==== Gender-affirming healthcare ====
According to Masen Davis of the Transgender Law Center, LGBT people in prisons often face barriers in seeking basic and necessary medical treatment, exacerbated by the fact that prison health care staff are often not aware of or trained on how to address those needs. Incarcerated people in the United States have a constitutional right to healthcare, and incarcerated transgender people can assert legal challenges under the 8th Amendment to access gender-affirming and gender-transition-related care under the framework first articulated in Estelle v. Gamble. The Supreme Court ruled in Farmer v. Brennan (1994) that under the cruel and unusual punishment clause of the Eighth Amendment, prison officials cannot be deliberately indifferent towards blatant abuse directed against transgender prisoners. Eighth Amendment claims can be brought either under 42 U.S.C. § 1983 for state prisoners or under a Bivens action to address deliberate indifference and denial of healthcare in federal prisons.

Some courts in the US have ruled that hormone replacement therapy is a necessary medical treatment to which transgender prisoners are entitled. In the early 2000s, California Medical Facility, Vacaville, provided this medical treatment for male-to-female prisoners. Additionally, access to psychological counseling and to supportive underclothing like bras can help individuals live as the gender with which they self-identify.

In 1992, UC Irvine researchers published an article detailing medical experiments performed on every trans female inmate in the California state prison system, ending with all subjects being indefinitely taken off hormone therapy. The authors wrote: "withdrawal of therapy was also associated with adverse symptoms in 60 of the 86 transsexuals. Rebound androgenization, hot flashes, moodiness, and irritability or depression were the most frequent complaints." At the time, no right to access gender appropriate care existed in California state prisons.

In June 2019, Layleen Polanco, a Black transgender woman, died of an epileptic seizure in solitary confinement on New York City's Rikers Island. Guards had noticed that she was unresponsive but waited 90 minutes to seek help. A year later, it was reported that 17 corrections officers would be disciplined as a result of the incident.

==== Defining gender-affirming care ====
Gender-affirming care can be understood as encompassing both medical (non-surgical), social, and surgical interventions. Under the World Professional Association of Transgender Health (WPATH) "Standards of Care for the Health of Transsexual, Transgender, and Gender Nonconforming People," gender-affirming healthcare is broadly defined as "primary care, gynecologic and urologic care, reproductive options, voice and communication therapy, mental health services (e.g., assessment, counseling, psychotherapy), and hormonal and surgical treatments." Gender-affirming healthcare is widely regarded as a "life-saving practice" both by physicians and members of the transgender and nonbinary community. Medical scholarship also recognizes that this "treatment is critical to maintain the health and safety of inmates, as without it, transgender prisoners may fall into deeper depression and have greater risk of life-threatening autocastration".

==== Legal overview of federal court decisions on gender-affirming care ====
Various courts have addressed the constitutionality of denying transgender people in prison gender-affirming care, including hormone therapy, mental healthcare, gender confirmation surgery, and grooming. Several U.S. Circuit Court of Appeals have held that the prison's duty to treat serious illnesses includes the treatment of gender dysphoria. Other Circuits have held that prison bans on hormonal therapies constitute deliberate indifference in violation of the 8th Amendment. There is some disagreement among Circuits as to whether denial of gender confirmation surgery constitutes deliberate indifference. Some lower courts have affirmed that prohibitions on gender-affirming healthcare are also unconstitutional.

These unconstitutional standings rely primarily on the subjective applications of the Eighth Amendment, particularly the application of "deliberate indifference." The application of protections and protection of rights for transgender incarcerated individuals is commonly referred to with discussion from the Supreme Court in Farmer v. Brennan (1994). Courts have then continued to apply the framework established in this case as precedent to cases involving the medical needs of transgender prisoners and recognizing gender dysphoria as a medical condition which requires treatment. Later cases such as Fields v. Smith (2011) and Edmo v. Corizon, Inc. (2019) reaffirm that failure to provide medically necessary gender-affirming surgery and hormone therapy could constitute deliberate indifference. These cases as well as others form the modern legal foundation for transgender prisoners' access to healthcare and physical safety in the United States prison system.

The Eighth Amendment was added on December 15, 1791, and includes explicit text that prohibits the use of excessive fines or bails and "cruel and unusual" punishments. The ratification of this amendment was intended to protect incarcerated individuals and the fairness of criminal proceedings. The subjective nature of "cruel and unusual" punishments remains frequently analyzed by the Supreme Court and court circuits.

Farmer v. Brennan 114 S. Ct. 1970 (1994), is a case that involves the subjective application of "cruel and unusual" punishment. This case involves the development of "deliberate indifference" to establish infraction upon a person's Eighth Amendment rights. Dee Farmer, a transgender woman, was imprisoned in an all-male federal facility for credit card fraud. At a previous federal prison she was placed in protective segregation due to safety risks because of her gender presentation. Upon transfer to the United States Penitentiary in Terre Haute, Indiana, she was initially held in administrative segregation, but was soon moved to the general prison population. Within two weeks after the removal from administrative segregation, Farmer was beaten and raped by another inmate. Farmer then filed a Bivens lawsuit (a lawsuit against government officers for violating constitutional rights) stating that prison officials had violated the Eighth Amendment's "cruel and unusual punishments" clause. She argued that officials knew that her feminine appearance increased her vulnerability to sexual assault, but still placed her in the general population, demonstrating deliberate indifference to her safety. In the lawsuit, Farmer sought both damages and an injunction (a court order that directs someone to do or stop something) to prevent similar future confinement conditions. The United States District Court for the Western District of Wisconsin ruled that officials could be liable only if they acted with "criminal recklessness" and the Seventh Circuit Court of Appeals upheld that decision without issuing a written opinion.

The Supreme Court granted certiorari (to deliver an opinion on the decision of a lower court) ultimately holding in contradiction to the United States District Court and the Western District Court of Wisconsin that prison officials' failure to prevent sexual assault or harm is infringing upon Eighth Amendment rights. The Court asserts "prison official's deliberate indifference to a substantial risk of serious harm to an inmate violates the Eighth Amendment." Deliberate indifference involves more than just the simple negligence but less than intentional harm. It can also be known as reckless disregard for a known risk. The application of "subjective recklessness," which encompasses what the official actually knew, was ruled by the Court to be the correct standard. This means that a prison official is liable only if they were aware of and disregarded a substantial risk of harm. There are two stipulations to this holding that must be met in order to prove constitutional violation. The first being the denial should be "sufficiently serious." The second involves the rationale of prison officials furthering the subjective application of the Eighth Amendment. Because the Court recognizes that "prison conditions may be 'restrictive and even harsh,'" however prison officials still must commit to the protection of inmates from other incarcerated individuals. Therefore, the objective test of "should have known" is rejected and the test requires proof of state of mind. This subjective test shows that liability is not allowed just because a danger was obvious, however the obvious danger can still be evidence that the official knew about it. Officials cannot avoid liability by arguing they knew of the risk but thought it wouldn't harm that specific inmate. On the other hand, officials are not liable if they genuinely didn't know of the risk or if they responded reasonably to it, even if hard still occurred.

The Farmer v. Brennan decision has been cited and used as precedent not only as a framework for addressing physical safety but also has laid the groundwork for understanding medical neglect as a form of deliberate indifference. As legal scholars and advocacy groups have noted, this precedent directly influenced the passing of the Prison Rape Elimination Act (PREA), which recognized that incarcerated LGBTQ+ individuals, especially transgender women, face disproportionately high rates of sexual assault and inadequate institutional protection.

There have been cases in which gender identity disorders were not addressed by the courts. Courts have sometimes directly avoided evaluating whether gender identity disorder constitutes a "serious medical need." Instead the cases have been dismissed on the grounds of lack of evidence of prisoners suffering or disagreements. One such example is the decision of the Tenth Circuit Court in Spicer, a.k.a Alexis R. Bell v. Terhune et al. (2003). Spicer sued the prison doctor for stopping hormone treatment for her gender identity disorder stating that this falls under deliberate indifference. The doctor's argument included that the hormone treatment was stopped because she had gained 29 pounds in six weeks. In this decision, the court ruled that deliberate indifference could not be cited if prisoner's opinions do not coincide with medical expert opinions, especially because Spicer was unable to provide corroborating expert opinions.

When systemic failures risk the physical safety of incarcerated individuals extend beyond that to include the evaluation and provision of gender-affirming care to be included in cruel and unusual punishment. Under the Eighth Amendment, denial or delay of medically necessary treatment, including for conditions such as gender dysphoria, has been found to cause severe psychological and physical harm, ranging from depression and anxiety to self-harm and suicide.

In Fields v. Smith 653 F.3d 550 (7th Cir. 2011), a group of transgender inmates in Wisconsin challenged Act 105, a state law that banned hormone therapy and gender-confirmation surgery for incarcerated individuals. Before the law, these inmates had been receiving hormone therapy to treat gender identity disorder (GID), a medically recognized condition and had the right to start new treatments when medically necessary. Some people with GID describe the experience as "being born into the wrong body, since they were born with the anatomy typically associated with one gender, but identify with the other." The plaintiffs argued that the Wisconsin Act 105 violated both the Eighth Amendment and the Fourteenth Amendment (amendment for equal protection). This case asks if Act 105's blanket ban on gender-affirming medical care violates these constitutional rights of transgender prisoners. The Seventh Circuit Court of Appeals affirmed the lower court's decision that Act 105 was unconstitutional, ruling in favor of the plaintiffs. The Court found that denying medically necessary hormone therapy amounted to deliberate indifference to a serious medical need, thus violating the Eighth Amendment. The reasoning behind this was the recognition that gender dysphoria (GID) as a serious medical condition that requires appropriate medical treatment, in accordance with the expert opinions of medical professionals and physicians. Medical experts agree that preventing hormone therapy and denying gender-affirming care can lead to life-threatening conditions. Dr Kallas from the American Medical Association affirmed an individual-by-individual assessment standard, stating "'it seems so obvious to me, that it's important that doctors are able to use their clinical judgment with respect to conditions that are significant, especially when it pertains to medically necessary treatment.'" The Court reasoned that by categorically banning hormone therapy and surgery, the state intentionally disregarded the medical needs of transgender inmates. Furthermore the statute's blanked denial of care was medically unjustifiable and caused unnecessary suffering. In conclusion, Fields v. Smith was the first federal appellate to explicitly hold that denying gender-affirming treatment violates the Eighth Amendment and expands upon Farmer v. Brennan's to include medical neglect as well. This landmark ruling also sets the stage for future cases.

Following Fields v. Smith (2011), courts began to apply the Eighth Amendment's subjective "deliberate indifference" not only to physical safety in prisons, but to also include medical neglect involving gender-affirming care. The next landmark development came in De'Lonta v. Johnson (2013), where the Fourth Circuit evaluated whether refusing to evaluate a prisoner for gender-affirming surgery could qualify as deliberate indifference.

In De'Lonta v. Johnson (2013), the plaintiff Ophelia De'lonta was a Virginia prison transgender female inmate. Following an initial case that was won by De'lonta regarding access to hormone therapy and the ability to live as a female in the male prison, De'lonta continued to face difficulties in receiving treatment for her gender identity disorder including attempts at self-mutilation. Six years following this initial case, De'lonta sued the Virginia Department of Corrections (VDOC) after their refusal to evaluate her for gender reassignment surgery even though it was medically indicated thus a violation of "deliberate indifference." De'lonta sued for violation of her Eighth Amendment rights as her treatment was denied. However, court documents state that "De'lonta's own allegations contradict the conclusion that Appellees are 'persistently denying her treatment,' since De'lonta acknowledges that VDOC has provided mental health consultations, hormone therapy, and cross-dressing allowances in accordance with the Standard of Care." Initially the judge dismissed the case based on that argument and following De'lonta's appeal, an amicus brief (when a third party submits additional information on law or policy that may have greater implications) was submitted by the ACLU of Virginia. In response, the Fourth Circuit Court of Appeals ruled that Ophelia De'lonta "stated a 'plausible' claim that the Virginia Department of Corrections violated her constitutional rights when it refused to have her evaluated for sex reassignment surgery." The court applied an analysis of two different factors in regards to this case, the first being the objective seriousness of it to which De'lonta demonstrated that her deprivation of her medical need and the need for protection against self-mutilation due to GID was objectively serious. The second factor that was considered is the subjective side of deliberate indifference where the intentional actions of the VDOC officials must be shown. Ultimately, the Fourth Circuit stated that the refusal for evaluation of surgery was an instance of deliberate indifference and emphasized that meeting the medical needs of inmates includes not only providing treatments for partial solutions such as hormone therapy and gender-affirming dressing but must include and address the inmates serious medical needs as well. The impact of this decision includes the standing that prison authorities must also "consider advanced or specialized medical interventions."

In Kosilek v. O'brien (formerly Spencer) (2012), a more definitive ruling happened. Since childhood, orphan Michelle Kosilek, formerly Michael Kosilek, dealt with confusion about his gender identity. As a teenager Michael faced intense trauma from his family including being repeatedly raped by his father and stabbed by his stepfather for expressing his interest in female identity, ultimately forcing him to run away from home. From 1967 to 1968, Michael began receiving hormone therapy from a physician in exchange for sex, however, faced with bullying from peers, Michael, dropped out and was in and out of prison, ultimately being sentenced to life in prison without the possibility for parole for killing his wife. While incarcerated, Kosilek continued to struggle with gender dysphoria and sought treatment for it. If a prisoner feels as though they are receiving inadequate medical care for a serious condition, they can sue under Section 1983 for violating constitutional rights. The Massachusetts Department of Correction (DOC) doctors recommended that Kosilek get sex reassignment surgery and stated that it was the only adequate and medically necessary treatment. Despite the recommendations of the doctors, the DOC Commissioner Kathleen Dennehy refused to approve the surgery. The state argued that the sex reassignment surgery would create "insurmountable" security problems with Dennehy arguing, "Kosilek would be at risk for sexual assault if she were to remain in a male prison, and housing her in a female prison would come with its own host of problems." With the two-pronged Eighth Amendment legal standard in order to win her claim, she would have to show 1.) she had a serious medical need and 2.) the treatment denial was deliberately indifferent, meaning that officials knew of her condition and disregarded the risk. The court ultimately found that both of the prongs were satisfied as her gender identity disorder had caused her extreme depression, self-harm, and suicidal tendencies. Furthermore, Dennehy ignored medical advice for non-medical reasons including fear of public backlash and personal bias. For an injunction, Kosilek had to prove a higher bar including 1.) she had a serious medical need 2.) sex reassignment surgery is the only adequate treatment 3.) officials know she faces serious risk without it 4.) the denial was not for legitimate prison-related reasons 5.) the unconstitutional conduct would continue. The court found that all 5 criteria were met. In response to being faced with a court order for Kosilek to receive sex reassignment surgery, in her testimony, Dennehy said, "she would probably retire before implementing something she considered unsafe... [and] she would still veto the surgery even if UMass told her it was medically necessary and even if Kosilek would likely attempt suicide if denied the surgery." The District Court's Judge Wolf ruled in favor of Kosilek, finding the DOC deliberately indifferent with an injunction requiring the surgery. The First Circuit Court of Appeals initially agreed with Judge Wolf, however, in an en banc review the full First Circuit rejected the injunction stating that the DOC's care did not violate the Eighth Amendment because Kosilek was receiving some treatment. Legal scholars state, "the implications of this holding are ambiguous." Some courts took the decision to mean that sex reassignment surgery is thus never medically necessary and never required under the Eighth Amendment, therefore blanket bans on gender-affirming surgery are constitutional. On the other hand, some courts interpret this holding as a case-specific analysis only saying that it was not medically necessary for Kosilek specifically, not that surgery is never medically necessary for anyone. Furthermore, legal scholars state that the blanket ban prohibiting sex reassignment surgery's constitutionality created a split among the Ninth and Fifth Circuits and both sides of the debate still relied on Kosilek to set their precedents and defend their claims.

Following Kosilek, courts continued to disagree on how to apply the "deliberate indifference" standard to gender-affirming surgery. In 2025, the First, Fifth, and Ninth Circuits are the primary federal appellate courts which have addressed granting gender confirmation surgery under the Eighth Amendment.

In Edmo v. Corizon, Inc. (2019), the U.S. Court of Appeals for the Ninth Circuit contradicted the decision of the Fifth Circuit, holding that denying a prisoner of gender confirmation surgery was in fact cruel and unusual punishment and was illegal under the Eighth Amendment. Adree Edmo was a prisoner in the Idaho Department of Corrections (IDOC) since 2012 and since a young age identified as a female. She consistently lived as a woman while incarcerated. Soon after becoming incarcerated, a psychiatrist diagnosed her with gender dysphoria and she began her social transition, legally changing her name and sex marker. She was eventually prescribed hormone therapy which provided some relief, but remained distressed about having male genitalia. Edmo attempted self-castration on two different occasions, describing the severe and psychological pain driving those actions. Dr. Scott Eliason, the psychiatrist that initially diagnosed her, evaluated her for gender-confirmation surgery (GCS), after one of the attempts. Dr. Eliason advised against GCS, stating counseling and hormone therapy were sufficient, however admitting that this was not in harmony with any standard of care or medical consensus. In 2017, Edmo filed her own complain in federal court asking for an injunction which would require the IDOC to provide the GCS, stating that the Eighth Amendment was violated. The district court reviewed the testimony of multiple medical experts and used the WPATH Standards of Care as the prevailing medical framework for treating gender dysphoria. The District Court found that there was a serious medical need and Edmo's gender dysphoria clearly met the threshold. Secondly, the District court had to come to a decision on if this was a case of deliberate indifference, with the central issue being if denial of surgery appropriately reflected accepted medical practice. Medical experts who testified said that surgery was necessary in this situation and that the IDOC's denial fell far outside accepted medical treatment. Thus, the district court concluded that IDOC's denial of GCS was inadequate care and met the subjective deliberate indifference standard. Ultimately, the court ruled in favor of Edmo and ordered IDOC to provide the surgery. Following this decision, Idaho appealed the ruling but the Ninth circuit upheld the injunction. The Ninth Circuit affirmed that this case clearly demonstrated serious medical need, IDOC was aware of the situation and severity, and medical evidence strongly supported the necessity of surgery. A follow-up request for rehearing was denied and the U.S. Supreme Court declined to review the case.

In Gibson v. Collier (2019), Vanessa Lynn Gibson, a transgender woman, was incarcerated in Texas and had been formally diagnosed with gender dysphoria. She sought gender confirmation surgery but the Texas Department of Criminal Justice (TDCJ) rejected the request because its official treatment policy did not include GCS. Gibson subsequently filed a lawsuit stating that the policy prevented the TDCJ from seeing if the surgery for medically necessary which constituted as deliberate indifference. The TDCJ director sought dismissal on the case based on qualified and sovereign immunity, which essentially means that the government can not sue the government itself unless the government has agreed to be sued and also protects government employees from being sued personally for money damages unless they violated a clearly established constitutional right and a reasonable official would have known their action was unconstitutional. The District Court denied the immunity defenses, but still ruled against Gibson on the Eighth Amendment claim. Gibson appealed, the Fifth Circuit appointed a counsel and ultimately affirmed the dismissal. The legal reasoning behind this was that the Fifth Circuit accepted that Gibson had a serious medical condition but saw that she could not prove deliberate indifference. The decision relied on Kosilek, stating that the decision to treat and provide GCS is a permissible medical choice rather than a constitutional violation. Judge Barksdale first argued that the case should have been passed back down to a lower court because the district court mishandled summary-judgement procedures. According to the judge, the TDCJ had the burden to show that there was no factual dispute that existed about whether surgery was medically necessary and the TDCJ did not meet that standard. The judge in their dissent also criticized the majority of the inclusion of evidence from Kosilek, saying that it was a different case, rather than relying on the actual record of the parties involved. Lastly, the claim that GCS should be viewed as medically permissible should be rejected according to Judge Barksdale dissent because there is no constitutional requirement that a treatment standard has to be "universally" endorsed. In their dissenting opinion, Judge Barksdale stated, "Tellingly, the majority provides no citation to any caselaw regarding this universal acceptance standard..."

This case represents the broader implications of both procedural defects and a misunderstanding of established medical science. If Gibson seeks further review, she would have extensive scientific support showing that gender-affirming surgery can be medically necessary. According to legal experts at the Harvard Law Review, this case highlights the growing divide between courts and contemporary medical knowledge, and raises questions about how the Eighth Amendment should be adapted to current understanding of gender dysphoria and its treatment.

==== Freeze-frame policies ====
Freeze-frame policies prevent incarcerated trans people from receiving gender-affirming healthcare, particularly hormone therapy, unless they were already receiving this healthcare prior to their incarceration. Under these policies, trans inmates may not start or expand their treatment while incarcerated. As a result, even a state that is legally bound to offer gender-affirming healthcare to trans inmates may deny that healthcare to someone who was not transitioning before being incarcerated. In other words, freeze-frame policies are much more common than outright bans on hormone therapy for incarcerated people. These policies continue to exist in several U.S. states and have been repealed in others. One obstacle in challenging these policies is that prison policy is determined largely at the state level; as a result, freeze-frame policies have been repealed piecemeal in each state in response to individual lawsuits. Several important cases have challenged freeze-frame policies in the Federal Bureau of Prisons, Georgia, and Missouri. Critics note that these policies rely on the assumption that transness and one's desire or comfort in seeking gender-affirming healthcare is static and fixed.

Ending freeze-frame policies, however, does not guarantee that incarcerated trans people will receive gender-affirming healthcare. Rather, the decisions in each of the cases challenging freeze-frame policies require that prisons conduct individualized assessments of inmates experiencing gender dysphoria. Hormone therapy is not always the treatment offered or deemed necessary following these assessments. In cases challenging these policies, the trans plaintiffs experienced severe mental health crises as a result of being denied care; courts weighed this risk of suicide and self-harm in determining whether hormone therapy was medically necessary for the plaintiffs. Additionally, trans inmates who do receive hormone therapy still do not have control over their healthcare decisions, as prison healthcare officials set dosages and treatment plans for inmates. On the whole, courts ending freeze-frame policies only intervene to ensure that prison policy does not constitute cruel and unusual punishment, leaving a significant gap between constitutionally permissible healthcare and healthcare that enables trans inmates to flourish and act with self-determination.

One of the earliest challenges to a freeze-frame policy came in 2011 in Adams v. Federal Bureau of Prisons. Vanessa Adams, a trans woman incarcerated in a federal prison, was diagnosed while incarcerated with Gender Identity Disorder (GID). Each of her 19 requests for treatment were denied under the BOP's freeze-frame policy. As a result, Adams attempted suicide and self-harm multiple times. In 2009, the National Center for Lesbian Rights, Gay and Lesbian Advocates and Defenders, Florida Institutional Legal Services, and Bingham McCutchen LLP challenged the policy in court. In 2011, the Obama administration settled with Adams. The settlement ended freeze-frame policies in all federal prisons, ensuring that trans inmates would receive individualized assessments and treatment plans for gender dysphoria.

In 2015, Ashley Diamond, a trans woman incarcerated in Georgia, sued the state for failing to provide hormone therapy under a freeze-frame policy and for failing to protect Diamond from sexual assault while incarcerated. She was represented by the Southern Poverty Law Center. Diamond had been undergoing hormone therapy for 17 years prior to her 2012 arrest, but because her intake forms failed to identify her as trans, the Georgia DOC's freeze-frame policy disqualified her from continued treatment. The conditions of her incarceration resulted in multiple self-harm and suicide attempts. Diamond v. Owens was significant because for the first time, the federal government stepped in to comment on states' legal requirements to provide gender-affirming healthcare. The U.S. Department of Justice released a statement in support of Diamond, stating that in Diamond's case, gender dysphoria required medically necessary treatment. Notably, the DOJ did not state unequivocally that prisons must provide hormone therapy. Rather, the DOJ argued that "proscriptive freeze-frame policies are facially unconstitutional under the Eighth Amendment because they do not provide for individualized assessment and treatment." Within a week of the DOJ intervention, Georgia ended its freeze-frame policy, committing instead to individually assess inmates' gender dysphoria and provide treatment accordingly. The court case, during which prison officials used incorrect pronouns in reference to Diamond, continued after this announcement, resulting in the Georgia DOC adopting a sexual assault prevention policy.

Jessica Hicklin, a trans woman from Missouri, was incarcerated at the age of 16 and sentenced to life in prison. At the age of 37, Hicklin challenged the Missouri Department of Corrections freeze-frame policy, claiming that it violated the 8th Amendment cruel and unusual punishment clause; Lambda Legal represented Hicklin in Hicklin v. Precynthe. Hicklin noted that at 16, she did not know what gender dysphoria was or have the resources to begin transitioning. In 2018, a federal court sided with Hicklin and ordered the Missouri DOC to provide Hicklin with gender-affirming healthcare in the form of hormone therapy, as well as other commissary products to help Hicklin socially transition. Hicklin v. Precynthe effectively ended Missouri's freeze-frame policy, giving incarcerated trans people greater access to gender-affirming care across the state.

=== Canada ===
On August 31, 2001, the Canadian Human Rights Tribunal concluded that Sections 30 and 31 of the Correctional Service of Canada contained discrimination on the basis of sex and disability in Canadian Human Rights Act after Synthia Kavanagh, a trans woman sentenced for life in 1989 for 2nd-degree murder, was sent to an institution for males. This institution assignment occurred despite the trial judge's recommendation that Synthia, as a trans woman, serve her sentence in a facility for women. Further, Synthia was denied sex reassignment surgery and hormones. The institutional policy, at the time, only facilitated cases which addressed conditions in which, reasonably, the plaintiff would seek sexual reassignment after the period of incarceration. Due to Synthia Kavanagh's life sentence, this was not a foreseeable option. "The decision to discontinue hormones in 1990 seems to have been based on the complainant's life sentence which made her, according to Dr. R. Dickey, apparently ineligible for ultimate reassignment. ... the diagnosis of transsexualism has been clearly established in this case" by expert witness testimony, throughout her trial, "She [had] responded well to feminizing effects of cross-gender hormones and has experienced no significant side effects. As established by legal precedent and confirmed by policy in Canadian and British Columbia Corrections Service, the complainant was entitled to continue her hormone treatment".

In Petitioning the Canadian Human Rights Tribunal, Kavanagh argued that "The Correctional Service of Canada has discriminated and continues to discriminate against me because of my disability and sex (Transsexualism), contrary to Section 5 of the Canadian Human Right Act, by refusing to provide me with necessary medical and surgical treatment." Kavanagh continues to elaborate on her transition prior to imprisonment in this address, stating "since 1981 I have been diagnosed as a transsexual, which means that my gender is female but my sex is male. For 13 years, I was on estrogen hormonal treatment and lived as a woman, in preparation for my sex reassignment surgery to correct my medical disorder. In May 1990, my hormonal treatment was discontinued." After incarceration in a men's facility Kavanagh "repeatedly asked the CSC to arrange for evaluation for sex reassignment surgery, for the surgery to be performed and my consequent transfer to a women's institution." The discontinuation of hormone treatment and rejection of proposed sex reassignment surgery, paired with the continuation of periods of solitude prompted Kavanagh to respond "I believe that the CSC Policy discriminates against transsexuals, as the policy does not recognize the need for the continuation of medical treatment at the onset of incarceration, nor does the policy acknowledge the psychological need to be imprisoned with other members of one's psychological sex at the time of incarceration."

Mental healthcare

Within US prisons, the mental health of LGBTQ persons has been shown to suffer, with a higher rate rate of mental illness and a lower likelihood of seeking healthcare, according to a 2016 survey. Efforts have been made to connect the prevalence of housing loss due to family rejection with correlated increased mental health issues and a higher rate of incarceration in Federal and State prisons.

=== Hungary ===
Hungary has compulsory HIV testing, which is part of the Ministry of Health regulations, which requires prostitutes, homosexuals, and prisoners be tested for HIV. When prisoners are found to be HIV positive they are taken to a special unit in Budapest. Units for HIV positive prisoners are staffed with individuals who are trained and who understand the problems of HIV. Specialized treatment of HIV are only available at one hospital in Budapest. HIV treatment for prisoners is paid for by the state-owned National Health Insurance Fund. These prisoners have their own cells with their own showers, a community room with games, and a social worker available to them. Post test counseling is also provided.

=== New Zealand ===
In a study in New Zealand, Transgender people in prisons were shown to be more likely to have previous experience with abuse, and a higher rate of incarceration. However, the NZ government has declared support for gender affirming healthcare for incarcerated persons, as well as gender-affirming clothing. NZ Researchers have attempted to connect gender dysphoria to mental health issues amongst transgender persons in prison as described by the Minority stress model often used in the study of LGBTQ mental health issues, which describes the intersectionality of minority issues and their impact on a group's mental well-being.

== LGBTQ youth prisoners in the United States ==
According to some studies, LGBTQ youth are particularly at risk for arrest and detention. Jody Marksamer, Shannan Wilber, and Katayoon Majd, writing on behalf of the Equity Project, a collaboration between Legal Services for Children, the National Center for Lesbian Rights, and the National Juvenile Defender Center, say that LGBT youth are over represented in the populations of youth who are at risk of arrest and of those who are confined in juvenile justice facilities in the United States.

Many LGBTQ youth often experience being cast aside from their families and hostile environments while at school. Because of social stigma associated with LGBTQ identities, many youths fear discovery by their families. 26% of adolescent LGBTQ males find themselves homeless after coming out. Homelessness is related to a higher rate of incarceration. According to "Messy, Butch, and Queer: LGBTQ Youth and the School-to-Prison Pipeline", LGBT youth are often blamed for the harassment they receive despite the fact that they are being targeted solely upon their sexual orientation or the way the LGBT students present themselves.

Queer youth are also socially and economically vulnerable, especially in regards to high rates of homelessness. This vulnerability can lead to illegal behavior, and also over policing when homeless, creating an over representation of LGBT youth in prisons.

A brief by the Center for American Progress found that approximately 300,000 gay, trans, and gender nonconforming youth are arrested or detained each year, 60% of whom are Black or Hispanic. These queer youth make up 13–15 percent of the juvenile incarceration system, compared to their overall population of 5–7 percent. Similar to how transgender adults are often placed into solitary confinement, allegedly for their own protection, these youth are "protected" in the same way. Often, however, it is because they are seen as sexual predators rather than potential victims. Courts also commonly assign queer youth to sex offender treatment programs even when convicted of a non-sexual crime. "As 12% of adjudicated youth in juvenile facilities reported experiencing sexual abuse in 2009" according to a report from the Juvenile Law Center. According to a survey by the Movement Advancement Project, transgender and intersex youths are often incarcerated in facilities for those of the incongruous gender identity, leading them to become vulnerable while incarcerated. LGBTQ youth are at a higher risk of sexual assault in prison. Where heterosexual youth report 2-4%, LGBTQ youth report 6-20% rate of peer sexual assault.

== Physical and sexual abuse ==
According to Amnesty International, globally, LGBT prisoners and those perceived to be LGBT, are at risk of torture, ill-treatment and violence from other inmates as well as prison officials. Amnesty International cites numerous cases internationally where LGBT inmates are known to have been abused or murdered by prison officials or fellow inmates.

A 2007 report by the Center for Evidence-Based Corrections at the University of California, Irvine found that 59% of a purposive sample of transgender people in one prison in California had been sexually assaulted while incarcerated, compared to 4.4% of a randomized sample of male prisoners from six California prisons. Transgender women in male prisons also deal with the risk of forced prostitution by both prison staff and other prisoners. Forced prostitution can occur when a correction officer brings a transgender woman to the cell of a male inmate and locks them in so that the male inmate can rape her. The male inmate will then pay the correction officer in some way and sometimes the correction officer will give the woman a portion of the payment.

"[P]risoners fitting any part of the following description are more likely to be targeted: young, small in size, physically weak, gay, first offender, possessing "feminine" characteristics such as long hair or a high voice; being unassertive, unaggressive, shy, intellectual, not street-smart, or "passive"; or having been convicted of a sexual offense against a minor. Prisoners with any one of these characteristics typically face an increased risk of sexual abuse, while prisoners with several overlapping characteristics are much more likely than other prisoners to be targeted for abuse."

=== In the United States ===
Gay and bisexual men are often assumed to be responsible for the preponderance of sexual assaults perpetrated in prisons as has been reflected in various American judicial decisions. For example, in Cole v. Flick (Note: 758 F. 2d 124 (3d Cir. 1985). According to trial documents, four expert witnesses, all of them prison wardens, testified to the legitimacy of this concern, stating their belief that "a correlation exists between security problems resulting from prison homosexuality and long hair, and that predatory homosexuals are more likely to attack or become involved in a fight over a long-haired inmate than a short-haired one.") the court upheld the right of prisons to limit the length of inmates' hair, claiming that allowing them to wear long hair could lead to an increase in attacks by "predatory homosexuals". In Roland v. Johnson, (Note: 1991 U.S. App. LEXIS 11468 (6th Cir. 1991)) the court described "gangs of homosexual predators". And Ashann-Ra v. Virginia (Note: 112 F. Supp. 2d 559, 563 (W.D. Va. 2000)) contains references to "inmates known to be predatory homosexuals [stalking] other inmates in the showers".

According to a study by Human Rights Watch, however, "The myth of the 'homosexual predator' is groundless. Perpetrators of rape typically view themselves as heterosexual and, outside of the prison environment, prefer to engage in heterosexual activity. Although gay inmates are much more likely than other inmates to be victimized in prison, they are not likely to be perpetrators of sexual abuse." (see also situational homosexuality).

A related problem is that there is a tendency, among both prison officials and prisoners, to view victimization as proof of homosexuality: "The fact of submitting to rape—even violent, forcible rape—redefines [a prisoner] as 'a punk, sissy, queer.'" Officials sometimes take the view all sex involving a gay prisoner is necessarily consensual, meaning that victims known or perceived to be gay may not receive necessary medical treatment, protection, and legal recourse, and perpetrators may go unpunished and remain able to perpetrate abuse on their victims.

According to Andrea Cavanaugh Kern, a spokesperson for Stop Prisoner Rape, the combination of high rates of sexual assault against gay prisoners and high rates of HIV infection in the prison population is "a life-or-death issue for the LGBT community".

While much of the data regards male prisoners, according to Amnesty International, "perceived or actual sexual orientation has been found to be one of four categories that make a female prisoner a more likely target for sexual abuse". It wasn't until 2003 that PREA (Prison Rape Elimination Act) was enacted by United States Congress to aid in the prevention of sexual abuse and misconduct.

==== V-coding ====
V-coding is the practice of assigning trans women placed in men's prisons to cells with aggressive cisgender male cellmates as both a reward and a means of placation for said cellmates, so as to maintain social control and to, as one inmate described it, "keep the violence rate down". Trans women used in this manner are often raped daily; and this process has been described as so common that it is effectively "a central part of a trans woman's sentence".

A 2021 California study found that 69% of trans women prisoners reported being forced to perform sexual acts against their will, 58.5% reported being violently sexually assaulted, and 88% overall reported being made to take part in a "marriage-like relationship". Trans women who physically resist the advances of other prisoners are often criminally charged with assault and placed in solitary confinement, the assault charge then being used to extend the woman's prison stay and deny her parole.

It is common for correctional officers to publicly strip search trans women inmates, before putting their bodies on display for not only the other correctional officers, but for the other prisoners. Trans women in this situation are sometimes made to dance, present, or masturbate at the correctional officers' discretion. A 2017 study by the Sylvia Rivera Law Project found that 75% of trans women respondents in New York state prisons were victims of sexual violence by a correctional officer, with 32% being victimized by more than one CO, 27% of respondents being forced to perform oral sex for a CO.

=== Colombia ===
In 2019, la Defensoría del Pueblo identified 285 cases of violence and discrimination against LGBTI prisoners. Over a third of these victims were transgender. One-eighth were Venezuelan.

== Segregation ==
For their own safety, LGBT people in prison are sometimes placed in administrative segregation or protective custody. Although, in the USA, homosexuality is "generally regarded as a factor supporting an inmate's claim to protective custody", homophobia among prison officials and a misperception among many guards that "when a gay inmate has sex with another man it is somehow by definition consensual" mean that access to such custody is not always easy or available.

Another problem is that protective and disciplinary custody are often the same, which means that prisoners in "protective housing" are often held with the most violent inmates in highly restrictive and isolated settings—sometimes in more or less permanent lockdown or solitary confinement—that prevent them from participating in drug treatment, education and job-training programs, from having contact with other prisoners or outside visitors, or from enjoying privileges such as the right to watch television, listen to the radio, or even to leave their cells. The degree of safety that protective custody provides depends on the facilities. Protective custody can provide a secure environment that is free from violence by other prisoners or it can isolate prisoners, and position them with a higher risk of violence by a correctional officer. Although the protective custody can offer some level of protection, the harmful physical and psychological impacts of isolation show that it is an unwanted alternative to assignment in the general population.

In other cases, institutions may have special areas (known by such nicknames as the "queerentine", "gay tank", "queen tank", or "softie tank") for housing vulnerable inmates such as LGBT people, elderly or disabled prisoners, or informers.

=== LGBT prison segregation in the United States ===
In a survey of over 1,000 LGBTQ prisoners across the US, 85% reported being placed in solitary confinement at some point in their sentence, while about half reported being in solitary for two or more years. This often happens as a form of punishment or targeting by prison officials or when housing in a collective area for LGBTQ prisoners is unavailable. Queer people of color were twice as likely to be placed in solitary than white queer inmates.

==== California ====
In Los Angeles at the Men's Central Jail, inmates who are perceived as LGBTQIA+ are segregated into a separate facility, sometimes called the "gay tank." With this designation, inmates are forced to wear different colored clothing from the rest of the prison population, which may put them at risk of identification and assault.

In San Francisco, for example, transgender inmates are automatically segregated from other prisoners. Nevertheless, according to Eileen Hirst, San Francisco Sheriff's Chief of Staff, being gay is not in itself enough to justify a request for protective housing: inmates requesting such housing must demonstrate that they are vulnerable. This area of the prison was primarily called the "gay tank" but as of 2015 was also being referred to as the "vulnerable male" section.

==== New York ====
At Rikers Island, New York City's largest jail, the segregated unit for LGBT prisoners, known as "gay housing", was closed in December 2005 citing a need to improve security. The unit had opened in the 1970s due to concerns about abuse of LGBT prisoners in pretrial detention. The New York City Department of Corrections' widely criticised plan was to restructure the classification of prisoners and create a new protective custody system which would include 23-hour-per-day lockdown (identical to that mandated for disciplinary reasons) or moving vulnerable inmates to other facilities. Whereas formerly all that was required was a declaration of homosexuality or the appearance of being transgender, inmates wanting protective custody would now be required to request it in a special hearing.

== Solitary confinement ==
As of 2011, solitary confinement had become the prison system's preferred method to protect transgender inmates from other prisoners in cases involving sexual assault, harassment and physical violence. Advocates for transgender prisoners argue that this method only increases the harassment they receive from officers and various other staff members as reported by Injustice at Every Turn.

=== Solitary confinement in the United States ===
In the report, 44% of transgender men respondents and 40% of transgender women respondents who were imprisoned reported being harassed by officers and/or other staff members of the prison system. While in solitary confinement, transgender individuals are less likely to receive medical care.

Out of the respondents in the same report 12% of transgender individuals surveyed reported being denied routine non-transition related healthcare and 17% reported being denied hormone treatment. The number was disproportionately higher when transgender people of color reported lack of transition health care and hormone treatment with American Indians reporting 36% denial and Black and/or African American reporting a 30% denial rate. The use of solitary confinement also lessens transgender inmate's access to programs and work assignments where they may be able to lessen their sentences, enter rehabilitation programs, or earn money to buy basic products such as soap and also lessens their chances to obtain parole or conditional release.

Solitary confinement has also shown to affect the mental health of transgender prisoners. With the report of filed by Injustice at Every Turn, 41% of respondents reported attempted suicide. With transgender people of color, 56% of American Indian and 54% of multiracial individuals reported attempted suicide. The report also links the over-use of solitary confinement as a factor in the high rate of suicide attempts by transgender people of color within the prison system.

In addition to the conditions themselves amounting to torture, solitary confinement usually restricts a person's access to education, work, and program opportunities. While mental health is a key priority and emphasis for inmates subjected to solitary confinement, there are other discriminatory disadvantages that come with it as well. For example, education and work programs are often essential prerequisites to achieving good time and parole. This means that many LGBT people, who are more likely to be placed in solitary confinement, are also less likely to be paroled or released early, forcing them to serve out their maximum sentences. Activists argue that members of the LGBT community should have equal access to prison programs and services, a right protected and provided for under the Fourteenth Amendment of the U.S. Constitution.

According to Title IX of the Education Amendments, discrimination on the basis of sex is illegal. Many education programs in prisons, jails, and juvenile detention centers are funded by the Federal government and those who take funding from the government must adhere to the full tenets of these amendments. Title IX extends to protect inmates who are denied access to prison programs and resources because of their gender identity or sexual orientation. The Fourteenth Amendment asserts that all inmates should have equal access to libraries, educational programs, the internet, and corresponding resources.

=== Solitary confinement in Canada ===
In cases where the incarcerated are assigned to prisons based on sex, rather than their gender-identity, complete segregation is often seen as the only viable way for ensuring safety. In the case of Synthia Kavanagh, a transgender woman inmate who was convicted of second degree murder in 1989, she was assigned to a male institution despite explicit recommendations from the trial judge. As a result, Kavanagh was "placed in segregation over extended periods of her incarceration for the purpose of protection from self-harm or abuse by others. Segregation for prolonged periods is not only inhuman but [is additionally] unconducive to any prospect of stabilization or rehabilitation." In 2001, the Canadian Supreme Court ruled that incarcerating Kavanagh in a male prison violated her rights and she was transferred to a female prison and started transitioning.

== Support for LGBT people in prison ==
As a result of the rise of awareness of LGBT persons in prisons, many organizations have developed specifically to support LGBT people in the prison system. These organizations address the various needs surrounding specific issues that LGBT persons in the prison system face. Some organizations also support family members of LGBTQ inmates.

Black and Pink is an American organization that is composed of "LGBTQ prisoners and 'free world' allies" who focus on prison abolishment movement and support LGBTQ prison inmates and their families. The organization offers various services such as court accompaniment, a pen pal program, workshops and training, and support for LGBTQ persons who are experiencing sexual violence, harassment, or lack of health care.

LGBT Books to Prisoners is donation-funded, volunteer-run, non-profit books-to-prisoners group based in Madison, WI. It sends books and other educational materials, free of charge, to incarcerated LGBT people across the United States. Since its founding in 2008, the organization has sent materials to almost 9,000 people. The organization also has resource lists on their website.

The Prison Activists Resource Center also provides information for organizations that are dedicated solely for LGBT prisoners, such as Hearts on a Wire, which is a Pennsylvania-based organization focused on helping transgender individuals. Other listed resources include GLBTQ Advocates and Defenders (GLAD). These sources either provide links for possible legal assistance, or provide materials in an attempt to make the prison experience more bearable.

== See also ==
- Criminalization of homosexuality
- Homelessness among LGBT youth in the United States
- Intersex human rights
- Legal status of transgender people
- LGBT people in American prisons
- LGBT rights by country or territory
- LGBTQ youth vulnerability
- Prison sexuality
- Prisoners' rights
- Sodomy laws in the United States
- Transgender Archives at the University of Victoria
- Transgender inequality § Violence and the criminal justice system
