= International Transgender Day of Visibility =

Event related to transgender people

Transgender Day of Visibility
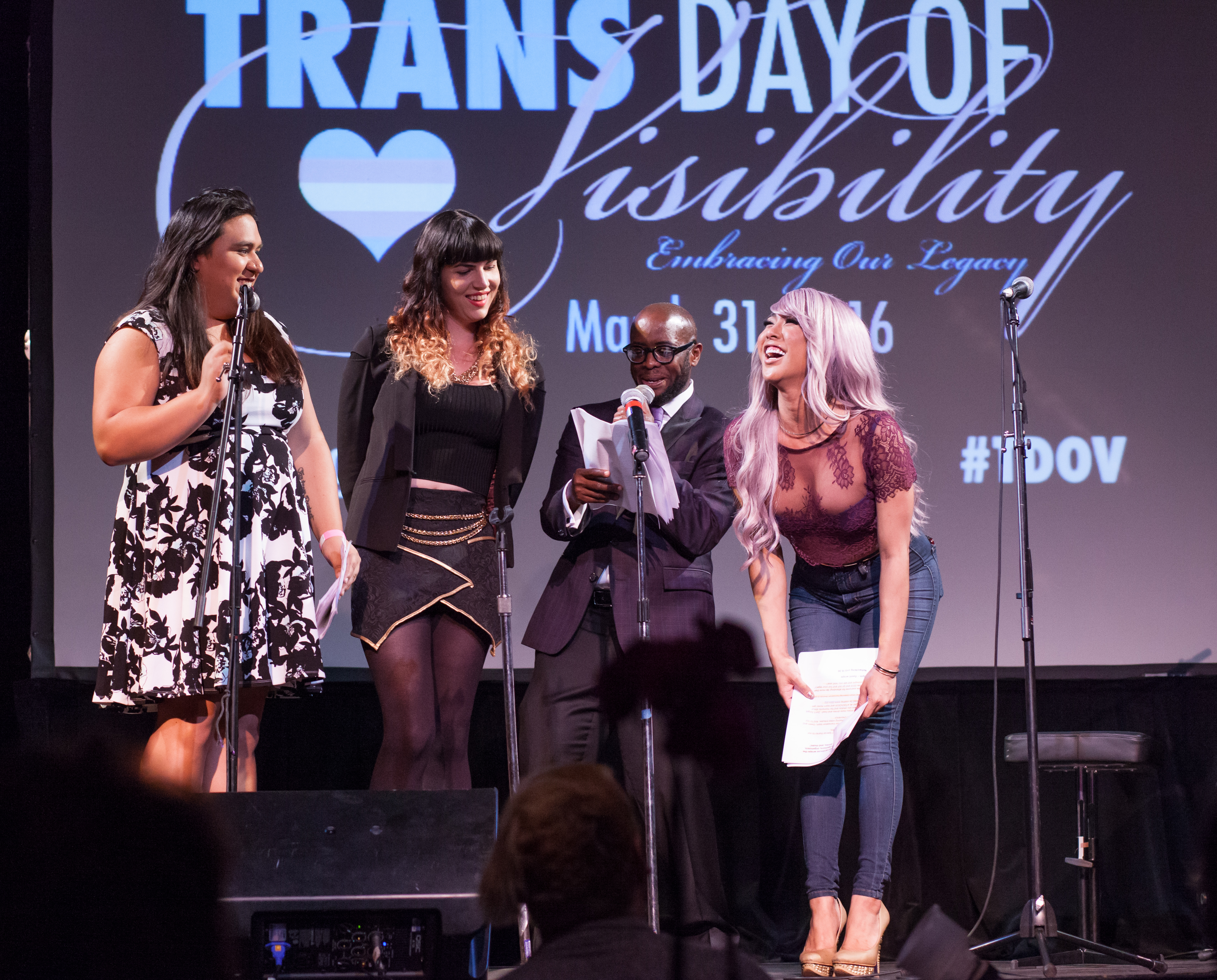
- Presenters on stage at the 2016 Trans Day of Visibility celebration in San Francisco
- Observed by: Transgender community and supporters
- Type: International; Cultural
- Date: March 31
- Frequency: Annual
- First time: 2009; 17 years ago
- Related to: Transgender Awareness Week, Transgender Day of Remembrance, International Non-Binary People's Day

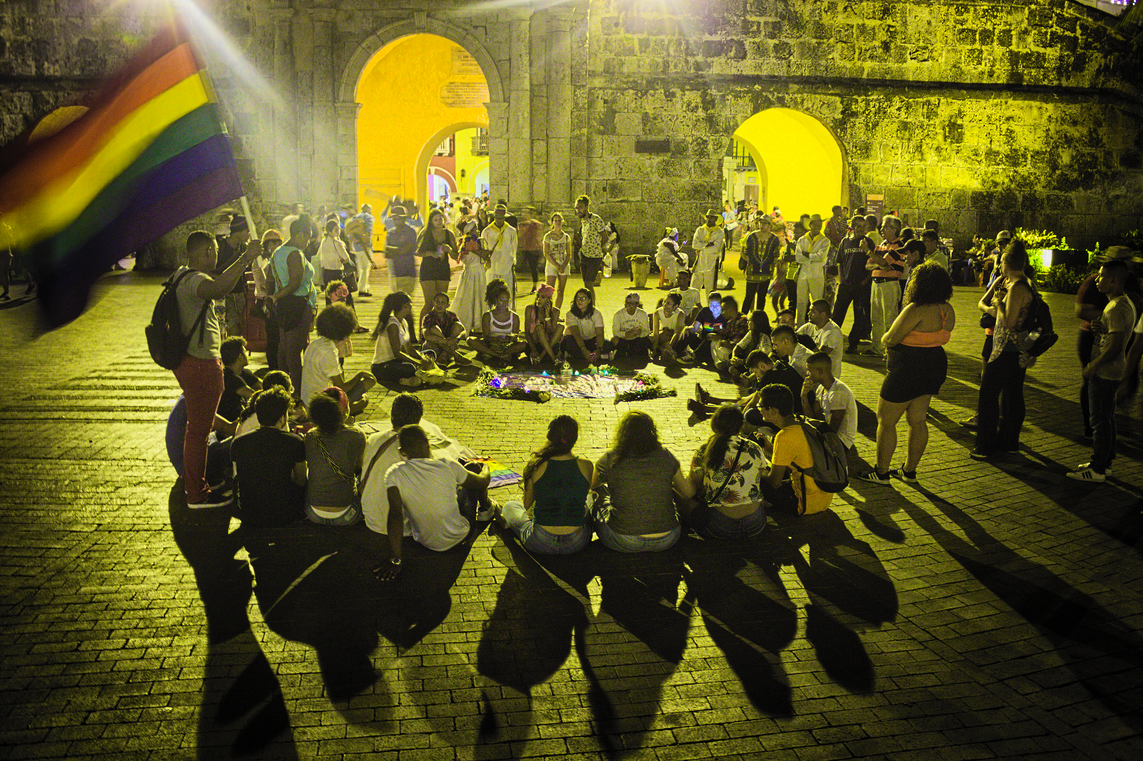
2019 Dia de la Visibilidad Trans, Cartagena, Colombia

International Transgender Day of Visibility, often simply Trans Day of Visibility or TDOV, is an annual event dedicated to celebrating transgender people, raising awareness of discrimination faced by transgender people, and acknowledging their contributions to society. The first International Transgender Day of Visibility was held on March 31, 2009, and has since been spearheaded by the U.S.-based youth advocacy organization Trans Student Educational Resources.

== History ==
=== 2009 founding ===
The event was created by transgender activist Rachel Crandall Crocker of Michigan in 2009 as a reaction to the lack of LGBTQ+ recognition of transgender people, citing the frustration that the only well-known transgender-centered day was the Transgender Day of Remembrance, which mourned the murders of transgender people, but did not acknowledge and celebrate living members of the transgender community.

=== 2014 ===
In 2014, the day was observed by activists across the world, including in Ireland and Scotland.

=== 2015 ===
In 2015, many transgender individuals participated in an online social media campaign on websites including Facebook, Twitter, Tumblr, and Instagram. Participants posted selfies, personal stories, and statistics regarding transgender issues and other related content to raise awareness and increase visibility.

=== 2021 ===
In 2021, U.S. President Joe Biden proclaimed March 31 as a Transgender Day of Visibility, stating in part, "I call upon all Americans to join in the fight for full equality for all transgender people." Biden was the first American president to issue a formal presidential proclamation recognizing the event. Biden issued a similar proclamation a year later, welcoming Jeopardy! contestant and transgender woman Amy Schneider to the White House and announcing a set of measures intended to support transgender rights.

=== 2024 ===
2024 marked the 15th anniversary of Transgender Day of Visibility with celebrations planned across the globe. Conservative pundits derided President Biden's proclamation of the day as an attack on Christianity, due to it coinciding with Easter Sunday that particular year.

=== 2025 ===
On February 6, 2025, President Donald Trump issued the executive order "Eradicating Anti-Christian Bias", citing the previous year's Transgender Day of Visibility as a reason for the order's creation.

=== 2026 ===
In 2026, transgender comedian, actor, and author Ash Perez published his first novel on International Transgender Day of Visibility.

== Reception ==
Over the years, Transgender Day of Visibility has had proponents and critics.

Supporters of TDOV have organized a variety of responsive events. In 2024, for instance, AP reported on marches in Melbourne and Philadelphia, an "inclusive roller derby" on Long Island, and a picnic in a small English town. Some places have been lit up with trans flag colors, such as Niagara Falls.

To advocates of TDOV, visibility enables trans people to experience less social isolation; it "illuminates and normalizes them to the rest of the world" and it builds empathy from the cisgender majority. The day is seen as a way to honor elders to trans communities, according to Shelby Chestnut of the Transgender Law Center, and "visibility means having the power and the ease to show up as all of who you are at any given moment," per Tourmaline.

Similarly, Erika Castellanos, a trans activist originally from Belize told UNAIDS, "Visibility is power. Only when given visibility can we raise our voices and advocate for the enjoyment of our human rights." A trans interviewee from Thailand argued that TDOV could educate the public about the needs, including health care and employment.

Also, TDOV highlights the importance of showing trans people having vibrant and full lives, especially during periods of violence against the trans community, as Black trans Minneapolis city council member Andrea Jenkins asserted in 2021, "We don't want to just wallow in this, [...] We also want to acknowledge the reality that our lives are beautiful and matter."

Effort to increase trans visibility have been criticized by Black prison abolitionists, who believe facile inclusion of trans persons in popular culture "leads to flattened understandings of Black trans life" and may endanger Black trans people. As abolitionist Miss Major Griffin-Gracy stated in 2019, "I don't really understand why we need a day of visibility, when for most of us, especially us Black girls, we are as visible as we need to be. Our visibility is getting us killed."

Similarly, some scholars argue that over-exposure of trans people can result in erasure, by virtue of perpetuating stereotypes or reducing people to statistical measures. Besides the paradox of visibility as a physical risk, others question whether TDOV is offering a "sanitized image of transgender people" that reinstantiates socioeconomic and racial exclusions.

In 2024, TDOV coincided with the Christian holiday of Easter that year. U.S. President Biden's support of TDOV was condemned by some Christian Republicans, which caused a brief political "controversy, which has galvanized conservatives and which transgender advocates say is manufactured."
