= National Center for Transgender Equality =

U.S. nonprofit organization

- Founded: December 12, 2003; 22 years ago
- Founder: Mara Keisling
- Dissolved: October 1, 2024; 2 years ago
- Type: Nonprofit advocacy organization
- Tax ID no.: 41-2090291
- Legal status: 501(c)(3) nonprofit organization
- Purpose: Rights of Transgender people
- Location: Washington, D.C., U.S.
- Coordinates: 38.904841°N 77.043242°W
- Executive Director: Rodrigo Heng-Lehtinen
- Revenue: $2,065,367 (2016)
- Expenses: $1,632,740 (2016)
- Employees: 8 (2019)
- Volunteers: 25 (2016)
- Website: transequality.org

The National Center for Transgender Equality (NCTE) was a nonprofit social equality organization founded in 2003 by transgender activist Mara Keisling in Washington, D.C. The organization works primarily in the areas of policy advocacy and media activism with the aim of advancing the equality of transgender people in the United States. Among other transgender-related issue areas, NCTE focuses on discrimination in employment, access to public accommodations, fair housing, identity documents, hate crimes and violence, criminal justice reform, federal research surveys and the Census, and health care access.

On October 1, 2024, the organization rebranded as Advocates for Trans Equality (A4TE) after merging with the Transgender Legal Defense and Education Fund.

== History ==
In 2002, then-co-chair of the Pennsylvania Gender Rights Coalition, Mara Keisling, moved to Washington, D.C., after recognizing the need for a professional activist presence in Washington for transgender people. With the support of the National Gay and Lesbian Task Force, Keisling established the National Center for Transgender Equality in 2003.

In the years since, NCTE has had numerous political victories. Early on, Keisling and NCTE led "United ENDA", a coalition of over 400 LGBTQ rights organizations lobbying for a version of the Employment Non-Discrimination Act that had explicit protections for transgender individuals. Although the bill ultimately failed to pass, it was the first-ever transgender-inclusive legislation to be proposed to the U.S. Congress and yielded the first-ever Congressional hearing on transgender rights issues.

Under the Obama administration, NCTE successfully lobbied for at least 150 federal policy changes on issues including health care access and non-discrimination in health services; federal employment protections; homeless and emergency shelter access; non-discrimination in federally-subsidized housing; and open military service for transgender service members. Also among these policy victories was the modification of State Department regulations, allowing transgender citizens to change the gender marker on their passport without necessarily having undergone genital reconstruction surgery.

In late 2019, NCTE made national news when two thirds of the staff resigned in protest of the executive team. Following the resignations of employees, an unfair labor practice charge was filed by the Nonprofit Professional Employees Union against NCTE. The National Labor Relations Board issued a dismissal letter for the complaint in April 2020.

In January 2024, NCTE announced that they would merge with the Transgender Legal Defense and Education Fund to form a new organization, Advocates for Trans Equality (A4TE). On October 1, 2024, the merger occurred, and A4TE was created.

=== Mission ===
NCTE's mission statement read:

The National Center for Transgender Equality is a national social justice organization devoted to ending discrimination and violence against transgender people through education and advocacy on national issues of importance to transgender people. By empowering transgender people and our allies to educate and influence policymakers and others, NCTE facilitates a strong and clear voice for transgender equality in our nation's capital and around the country.

== Prominent staff ==
=== Mara Keisling ===
Mara Keisling is the founding executive director of NCTE. She is a trans woman and began transitioning in her early 40s. In addition to her work as executive director of NCTE, Keisling is a founding board member of the Stonewall Democracy Fund. She has also served as co-chair of the Pennsylvania Gender Rights Coalition, on the board of directors of LGBTQ youth group Common Roads, and on the steering committee of the Statewide Pennsylvania Rights Coalition. In recognition of her activism, Keisling has won awards from PFLAG; the Equality Forum; GayLaw; the Transgender Law Center; the Harvard Bisexual, Gay, Lesbian, Transgender and Supporters Alliance; and Out for Work, among others. Keisling was subject to controversy and was called to resign as executive director of NCTE in 2019. In 2021, the organization announced that Keisling decided to not renew her contract, and that the board of directors had selected Deputy Executive Director Rodrigo Heng-Lehtinen as her successor.

=== Rodrigo Heng-Lehtinen ===
Rodrigo Heng-Lehtinen is a transgender policy, advocacy and messaging expert. As a transgender man, his wide-ranging experience in the LGBTQ movement has covered field organizing, leadership development, fundraising, and media advocacy. He previously worked with Freedom for All Americans, GLAAD, the Transgender Law Center, Gender Justice LA, and the National LGBTQ Task Force. In past roles, he trained thousands of volunteers to canvass and phone bank on groundbreaking nondiscrimination and marriage equality campaigns, and organized leadership development programs in transgender communities and LGBTQ communities of color, honing new strategies for social change. Most recently, he co-led the successful campaign to update New Hampshire's nondiscrimination protections to include transgender Granite Staters. Over the course of his career, he has conducted international Spanish-language interviews, including on Univision, Telemundo, and CNN en Español, as well as English-language interviews with outlets such as The New York Times, MSNBC, CNN, and Politico. Rodrigo graduated from Brown University and lives in Washington, D.C. He serves of the Board of Directors of AsylumConnect, a non-profit connecting LGBTQ asylum seekers with resources in the US and Canada.

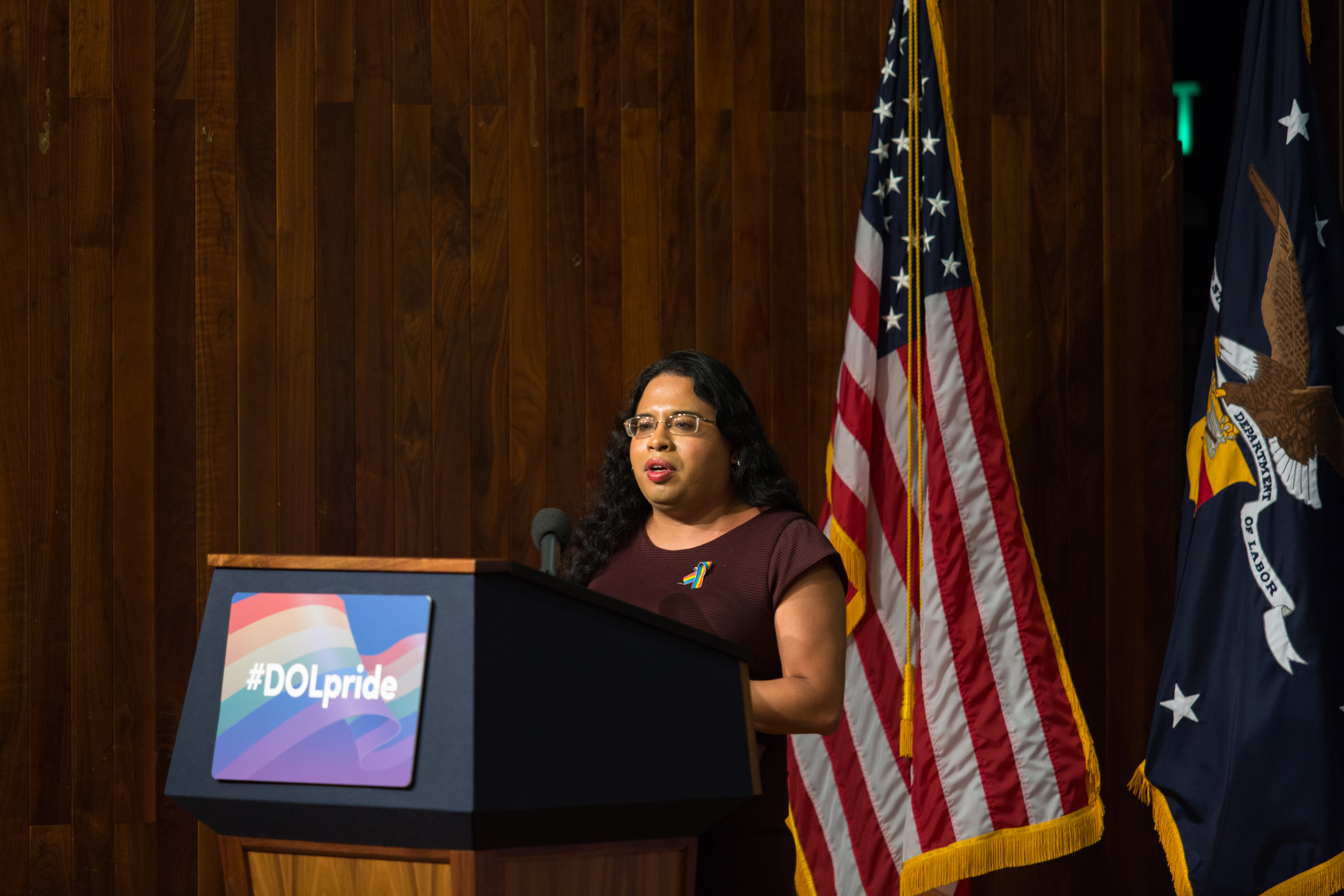
Raffi Freedman-Gurspan on June 28, 2016, at the Department of Labor

=== Raffi Freedman-Gurspan ===
Raffi Freedman-Gurspan is former director of external relations and former policy advisor at NCTE. Before joining NCTE as policy advisor in 2014, she served as legislative staffer for the Massachusetts Transgender Political Coalition, LGBT liaison for the City of Somerville, and legislative director for Massachusetts State Representative Carl Sciortino, a Medford Democrat. On August 18, 2015, she was hired by President Barack Obama as Outreach and Recruitment Director in the White House Presidential Personnel Office, becoming the first openly transgender person to work as a White House staffer. He subsequently appointed her as the White House's primary LGBTQ liaison in 2016, making her the first openly transgender person in the role. On April 3, 2017, Freedman-Gurspan rejoined NCTE as director of external relations.

In May 2019, Freedman-Gurspan left NCTE to become Deputy Campaign Director for the All on the Line Campaign, a project with a mission to end gerrymandering.

== Programs ==
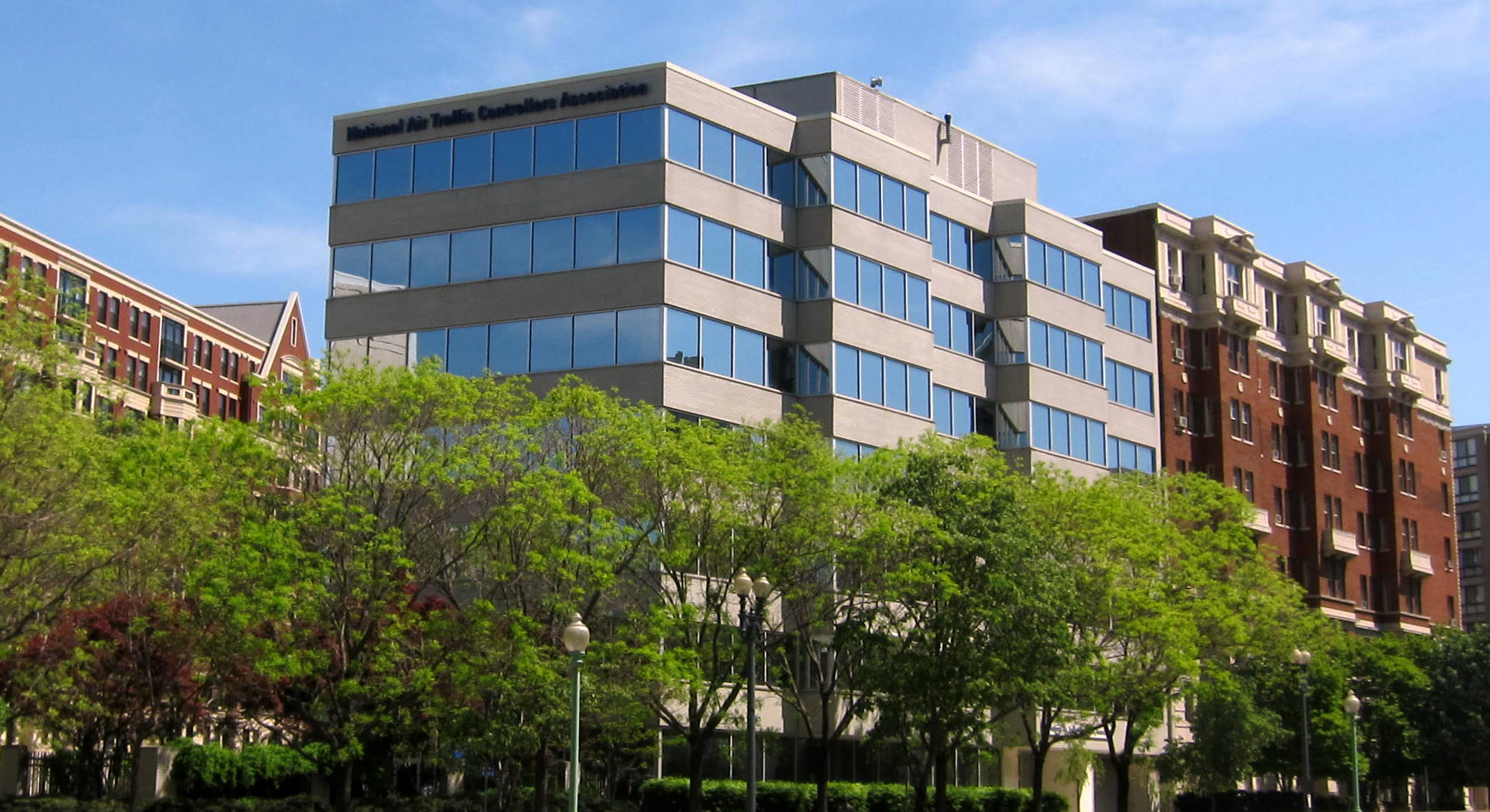
National Center for Transgender Equality headquarters in the Logan Circle neighborhood of Washington, D.C.

NCTE works to educate policy makers and the American public about the transgender community and the issues facing it, as well as to lobby Congress and other policy makers to adopt policies that support the rights and human dignity of transgender Americans. In service of this mission, NCTE runs several programs spanning a variety of policy issue areas.

=== Policy issues ===
NCTE works on a variety of policy issues of significance to the transgender community. These include: state policy agendas; hate crimes and violence; employment non-discrimination; advocating for transgender parents and families of transgender people; health care access; access to homeless and emergency shelters; immigration reform; open military service; criminal justice reform; racial and economic justice; federal research surveys and the Census; travel security procedures and bodily privacy; voting rights; and protections for transgender students from bullying, discrimination, and accommodations exclusions.

In addition to these policy programs, NCTE maintains an ID Documents Center and the Transgender Legal Services Network. The ID Documents Center offers a constantly updated database of federal, state, and territory-based policies regarding name and gender change procedures so that transgender individuals can more easily navigate these complex legal processes. The related Transgender Legal Services Network offers a consortium of over 60 organizations that offer advice, technical support, and legal resources to transgender individuals, many of which undertake pro bono projects. The Network also confers to improve one another's organizational capacities and expand their service provisions.

=== United ENDA ===
NCTE undertook successful work on state and local policies and in getting "gender identity" added to federal hate crimes legislation (which passed in 2009 as the Matthew Shepard and James Byrd Hate Crimes Prevention Act). But its primary initial policy goals were transforming the lesbian and gay rights movement into the LGBTQ rights movement and adding gender identity and expression language to the Employment Non-Discrimination Act (ENDA), which was then pending before Congress and covered only "sexual orientation". A significant step toward making the lesbian and gay rights movement more inclusive occurred in 2007, when NCTE and the National Gay and Lesbian Task Force led a coalition of more than 350 trans and LGBTQ groups known as United ENDA, which demanded that Congress not pass ENDA without gender identity protections. Even though no version of ENDA was enacted, the United ENDA campaign was a turning point in LGBTQ activism, leading to the solidification of an LGBTQ movement that was fully committed to trans rights. ENDA had been the legislative priority for lesbian and gay rights organizations since it was first introduced in 1994, but gender identity protections were not added until 2007. ENDA was replaced in 2015 with the Equality Act, which would ban discrimination based on sex, sexual orientation, and gender identity in not just employment, but also in public accommodations, education, housing, and credit. The Equality Act has yet to become law as of 2025.

=== ID Documents ===
NCTE is increasingly more involved in state advocacy as resources allowed, which included pushing states to make it easier for trans people to change their names and gender markers on identification documents (e.g., driver's licenses and birth certificates) and to enact policies requiring health insurance companies and systems (such as Medicaid) to cover transition-related healthcare. NCTE maintains comprehensive resources on its website to assist trans people with navigating the complex state and local policies on ID documents, as well as navigating healthcare systems to get them to provide transition-related care.

=== Won't Be Erased ===
During the Trump Administration, NCTE was a leader in resisting policy rollbacks from the federal government. In 2018, NCTE launched the "Won't Be Erased" campaign in response to a leaked White House memo that outlined a strategy to overturn protections for trans people. To document and raise awareness of the anti-trans actions of the Trump administration, NCTE has also catalogued each loss on its website in a project called "The Discrimination Administration".

=== Transgender Lobby Day ===
On March 15, 2004, NCTE partnered with the now-defunct National Transgender Advocacy Coalition to run the first ever Transgender Lobby Day, for which transgender citizens and allies from across the country came to Washington to speak with their Senators and Representatives. Since then, NCTE has organized lobby days every few years consisting of a conference on transgender policy issues and meetings with members of Congress in which participants share their stories and talk about transgender issues. Past lobby days have featured guests from organizations such as the White House Office of Public Engagement, as well as prominent figures such as transgender activist and lawyer Shannon Minter from the National Center for Lesbian Rights, Masen Davis from the Transgender Law Center, Rep. Joe Kennedy III, and former Speaker of the House Rep. Nancy Pelosi. Transgender lobby days frequently draw over 200 participants from nearly every state.

=== Reports ===
==== National Transgender Discrimination Survey (2008) ====
In 2008, NCTE partnered with the National LGBTQ Task Force and Pennsylvania State University's Center for the Study of Higher Education to launch the National Transgender Discrimination Survey (NTDS). Then the largest study of transgender individuals in the United States, the NTDS surveyed 6,450 transgender residents about their experiences of discrimination in areas such as employment, housing, health care, and education, among others. The findings of the NTDS have since informed public policy in the United States, such as at the Department of Housing and Urban Development, which based new housing regulations to protect LGBTQ people on the study.

==== U.S. Transgender Survey ====
In 2015, NCTE followed up the NDTS by launching the U.S. Transgender Survey (USTS), the largest study of transgender individuals in the United States at that time. Nearly 28,000 LGBTQ+ residents participated in the survey including 17,151 (61.9%) reporting they had pursued broadly defined gender affirmation.

The questions covered a broad range of topics pertaining to family life, health, housing, income, employment, discrimination, harassment and violence, military service, political participation, and others. In addition to the full national report, NCTE has released various breakout reports focusing on specific states. As of February 2024, breakout reports for 43 states have been released.

Another U.S. Trans Survey followed in 2022, with over 92,000 responses, surpassing the 2015 study as the largest nationwide survey of trans people. A report on early findings was released in February 2024.

=== Media ===
NCTE is a frequent source of analysis and commentary for both American and international news media. In her capacity as executive director of NCTE, Keisling has appeared as a guest on news channels such as CNN, C-SPAN, Fox News, and MSNBC. She is frequently quoted in newspapers, news magazines, and online news sources, including The New York Times, The Washington Post, The Guardian, Time, BuzzFeed, and The Huffington Post. Keisling has also published op-eds in numerous outlets, including The New York Times, Time, NBC, CNN, and The Huffington Post. NCTE's former director of policy, Harper Jean Tobin, is similarly often quoted by news media including The New York Times, Reuters, PBS, and The Huffington Post, and has published op-eds in publications such as The Guardian. The organization also maintains its own blog on Medium.

== Action Fund ==
In October 2017, NCTE launched an affiliated 501(c)(4) organization, the National Center for Transgender Equality Action Fund. Because of its tax status, the Action Fund can endorse and oppose political candidates, which NCTE cannot do as a 501(c)(3) organization. At launch, the Action Fund endorsed three transgender candidates for public office: Phillipe Cunningham and Andrea Jenkins, who were running for seats on the Minneapolis City Council, and Danica Roem, who was running for the 13th District seat in Virginia's House of Delegates. In 2018, the NCTE Action Fund endorsed Brianna Titone for Colorado State Representative and Gerri Cannon for New Hampshire State Representative, who are the second and third sitting transgender state representatives (after Danica Roem became the first in Virginia in 2017). NCTE Action Fund also endorsed Alexandra Chandler for U.S. House of Representatives (MA-3), Christine Hallquist for Governor of Vermont, Kim Coco Iwamoto for Lieutenant Governor of Hawai'i, Amelia Marquez for Montana House of Representatives, and Melissa Sklarz for New York State Assembly. In 2019, the NCTE Action Fund endorsed Danica Roem for the second time, for her successful re-election to the Virginia House of Delegates. On May 5, 2020, the NCTE Action Fund made its first-ever Presidential endorsement: Joe Biden for President of the United States. The organization also provides resources addressing the specific needs of transgender voters.

== Controversy ==
In 2019, the majority of NCTE staff members resigned from the organization, citing concerns about workplace culture and the treatment of marginalized members of the trans community. Staff had previously called for the resignation of Executive Director Mara Keisling and Deputy Director Lisa Mottet in September 2019, but at the time, both executive leaders refused to resign. The National Labor Relations Board issued a dismissal letter for the complaint in April 2020.

== See also ==
- List of transgender-related topics
- List of transgender-rights organizations
- List of LGBT rights organizations
