= Keisling =

Keisling is a surname. Notable people with the surname include:

- Kelly Keisling (born 1951), American politician
- Mara Keisling (born 1959), American transgender rights activist
- Phil Keisling (born 1955), American businessman and politician
