= GATE (organization) =

Transgender and intersex rights organization

Global Action for Trans Equality
- Abbreviation: GATE
- Formation: 2009
- Type: NGO
- Purpose: Transgender and intersex rights, education and peer support
- Executive director: Erika Castellanos
- Website: gate.ngo

Global Action for Trans Equality (GATE) is an organization and think tank on gender identity, sex characteristics and body diversity (transgender and intersex) issues. The current executive director is Erika Castellanos, effective 1 January 2023.

== Founding ==
Former co-directors included Mauro Cabral Grinspan, Justus Eisfeld, a co-founder of Transgender Europe and a contributor to the Activist's Guide for the Yogyakarta Principles in Action and Masen Davis, also formerly Executive Director of the Transgender Law Center. The organization was founded in 2009.

== Activism ==
The organization works on reform of medical protocols, HIV response, and access to funding. In 2014, GATE and American Jewish World Service published the first study on transgender and intersex groups' access to funding.

GATE also has a connection with Julia Ehrt of Transgender Europe in Germany and Tamara Adrian of International Lesbian, Gay, Bisexual, Transgender & Intersex Law Association in Venezuela. It also maintains a durable relationship with United Nations Special Rapporteurs and NGOs, and tries to advance its political agenda through lobbying at the United Nations and World Health Organization. On 17 June, GATE contributed to the resolution of UN Human Rights Council presented by South Africa along with Brazil concerning human rights on sexual orientation and gender identity. On 30 June 2011, Cabral Grinspan, held a speech at the European Parliament Subcommittee on Human Rights for the trans and intersex rights.

In 2022, GATE released a report mapping anti-trans actors in the United Kingdom. According to the report there had been a "dramatic increase in anti-trans content and activity in UK media and politics" since 2015, and that the most influential group in this rise was a "large coalition of the right/media", though some centrist and leftist actors were also involved.

== Awards and recognition ==
In July 2015, Mauro Cabral Grinspan, founding co-director at GATE and would-be executive director, was a co-recipient of the inaugural Bob Hepple Equality Award, alongside Pragna Patel of Southall Black Sisters. The award is named for Bob Hepple, the former lawyer of Nelson Mandela. The Oxford Human Rights Hub comments, "Cabral was crucial in the process leading to the enactment of Argentina’s Gender Identity Law in 2012, a law which has been extensively cited in court decisions on gender identity cases, including the Indian Supreme Court, and which has inspired legislation reform in countries including Malta, the Netherlands and Sweden."

== See also ==
- List of transgender-rights organizations
- List of LGBT rights organizations
- Intersex civil society organizations
- Intersex human rights
- Yogyakarta Principles
