= Advocates for Trans Equality =

U.S. nonprofit organization

- Founded: October 1, 2024; 2 years ago
- Type: Nonprofit advocacy organization
- Legal status: 501(c)(4) nonprofit organization
- Purpose: Rights of Transgender people
- Chief Executive Officer: Andrea Hong Marra
- Website: transequality.org

Advocates for Transgender Equality (A4TE) is an American civil rights organization that focuses on the legal and political rights of the transgender community. The organization was formed in 2024 through the merger of the National Center for Transgender Equality and Transgender Legal Defense & Education Fund.

== Structure ==
A4TE operates as the Advocates For Trans Equality Education Fund, a 501(c)3 organization focusing on litigation and public education, and as Advocates for Trans Equality, a 501(c)4 organization focused on policy work at the federal, state, and local level.

== History ==
In January 2024, the National Center for Transgender Equality (NCTE) and Transgender Legal Defense & Education Fund (TLDEF) announced their intention to merge, forming a new organization named Advocates for Trans Equality (A4TE). They cited desire to combine the organization's resources to counter an increase in anti-transgender state legislation. The merger was finalized on October 1, 2024.

Initially, the newly formed organization was led by TLDEF executive director Andrea Hong Marra as Chief Executive Officer and NCTE executive director Rodrigo Heng-Lehtinen as Executive Director. In April 2025, Heng-Lehtinen announced he would step down at the conclusion of his contract on April 30, 2025, leaving Marra as the primary executive leader.

In March 2026, 96% of A4TE's staff union voted to authorize a strike, citing "unresolved disputes over job security, pay equity, and transparency about the organization’s future." The strike was called off after A4TE reached a tentative agreement with the union.

== Programming ==
=== Legal advocacy ===
A4TE's operates an impact litigation program that files lawsuits and submits amicus briefs regarding transgender and nonbinary rights. In 2026, A4TE filed an amicus brief in the case Chiles v. Salazar, a United States Supreme Court case concerning a Colorado law that prohibited licensed mental health professionals from practicing conversion therapy on minors.

=== Policy ===
A4TE operates policy and organizing departments focused on legislative advocacy at the local, state, and federal levels. At the federal level, A4TE lobbies the United States Congress on federal civil rights legislation such as the Equality Act. A4TE also tracks pro and anti-trans laws at the federal and state level and organizes public outreach campaigns to lobby elected officials.

=== Electoral work ===
A4TE participates in electoral politics through voter engagement campaigns and endorses candidates for elected office who support transgender rights. In 2025, A4TE partnered with the LGBTQ Victory Fund to provide training for transgender candidates.

=== Trans Remembrance Project ===
A4TE hosts the Trans Remembrance Project, which tracks violent deaths and suicides of transgender people in the United States. In 2025, A4TE hosted an online vigil for Transgender Day of Remembrance alongside LGBTQ+ community organizations GLAAD, the Transgender Law Center, Equality Federation, and the Human Rights Campaign.
