= Mara Keisling =

American transgender activist

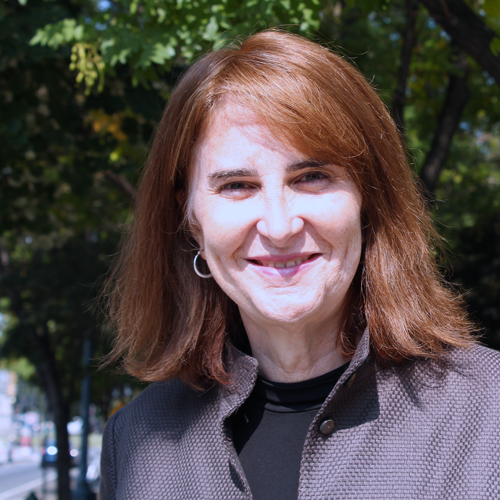
- Keisling in 2015
- Born: September 29, 1959 (age 66); Scranton, Pennsylvania, U.S.
- Education: Pennsylvania State University (BSS)
- Occupation: Activist
- Employer: National Center for Transgender Equality (2003– Summer 2021)
- Known for: Transgender rights activism

Mara Keisling (born September 29, 1959) is an American transgender rights activist and founding executive director of the National Center for Transgender Equality. In 2003, Keisling founded the National Center for Transgender Equality to advocate for the rights of transgender people in the United States.

== Early life and education ==
Keisling was born to William and Elaine Keisling in Scranton, Pennsylvania, as one of seven siblings in a Jewish family. She graduated with a Bachelor of Social Science degree from the Pennsylvania State University, and did graduate work in American Government at Harvard University. She has worked for 25 years in social marketing and public opinion research, while also teaching government as an adjunct faculty member at George Mason University and Marymount University.

== Activist career ==
After coming out as a transgender woman in her early 40s, Keisling moved home to Pennsylvania, where she became a transgender rights activist. She first co-chaired the Pennsylvania Gender Rights Coalition, during which time she recognized the need for a professional activist presence in Washington for transgender people. She moved back to Washington in 2002 and established the National Center for Transgender Equality in 2003.

In addition to her work as executive director of the National Center for Transgender Equality, Keisling has also served on the board of directors of LGBTQ youth group Common Roads and on the steering committee of the Statewide Pennsylvania Rights Coalition.

In recognition of her activism, Keisling has won awards from PFLAG; the Equality Forum; GayLaw; the Transgender Law Center; the Harvard Bisexual, Gay, Lesbian, Transgender and Supporters Alliance; and Out for Work, among others. In 2017, she was included on Ms. Magazine's list of "45 Feminist Women to Follow on Twitter."

=== National Center for Transgender Equality ===
During her tenure as executive director, the National Center for Transgender Equality has had numerous political victories. In 2007, Keisling and NCTE co-led "United ENDA," a coalition of over 400 LGBTQ rights organizations lobbying for a version of the Employment Non-Discrimination Act that had explicit protections for transgender individuals. Although the bill ultimately failed to pass, it was the first-ever transgender-inclusive legislation to be proposed to the U.S. Congress and yielded the first-ever Congressional hearing on transgender rights issues. Under the Obama administration, NCTE also successfully lobbied for the modification of State Department regulations, allowing transgender people to change the gender marker on their passport without necessarily having undergone genital reconstruction surgery.

In 2008, NCTE partnered with the National LGBTQ Task Force to launch the National Transgender Discrimination Survey (NTDS). Then the largest study of transgender individuals in the United States, the NTDS surveyed 6,450 transgender residents about their experiences of discrimination in areas such as employment, housing, health care, and education, among others. The findings of the NTDS have since informed public policy in the United States, such as at the Department of Housing and Urban Development, which based new housing regulations to protect LGBTQ people on the study.

In 2015, NCTE followed up the NDTS by launching the U.S. Transgender Survey (USTS), thus far the largest survey of transgender individuals in the United States. Nearly 28,000 transgender residents participated in the survey, which covered a broad range of topics pertaining to family life, health, housing, income, employment, discrimination, harassment and violence, military service, political participation, and others. In addition to the full national report, NCTE has released various breakout reports focusing on specific states.

In her capacity as executive director of NCTE, Keisling has been an oft-cited source of political commentary in mainstream American media. She has appeared as a guest on news channels such as CNN, C-SPAN, Fox News, and MSNBC. She is frequently quoted in newspapers, news magazines, and online news sources, including The New York Times, The Washington Post, The Guardian, Time, BuzzFeed, and The Huffington Post. Keisling has also published op-eds in numerous outlets, including The New York Times, Time, NBC, CNN, and The Huffington Post.

=== Arrest in North Carolina ===
In 2016, North Carolina Governor Pat McCrory signed the Public Facilities Privacy & Security Act into law, thereby eliminating anti-discrimination protections for LGBTQ people and legislating that, in government buildings, individuals may only use restrooms and changing facilities that correspond to the sex listed on their birth certificates. In an act of protest while visiting the North Carolina State Capitol to ask the governor to repeal the law, Keisling used the women's restroom in the governor's office, posting a photo of the restroom door to social media. As she recounted to BuzzFeed News, other women in the restroom did not respond negatively to her presence and a state police officer in the area took no action to prevent or reprimand her. Keisling was subsequently arrested along with other demonstrators for holding a sit-in at the North Carolina State Legislative Building.

=== Racism accusations ===
In 2019, the majority of NCTE staff members resigned from the nonprofit organization, citing concerns about workplace culture and the mistreatment of trans staff and community members of color under Keisling's leadership, dropping the total organizational staff count from 23 to only 7. An open letter by former staff published by OUT Magazine stated that 60% of departing staff between 2012 and 2019 were people of color, the majority of whom had "expressed strong complaints of racism within the organization."

During this time, transgender activist and journalist Monica Roberts published an article on her GLAAD Media Award winning blog, TransGriot, which accused Keisling of calling her and Dawn Wilson, a fellow Black Southern transgender activist, an "uppity n-word" at the 2002 Southern Comfort Conference. Wilson corroborated Roberts' account to a NewNowNext reporter, adding that her and Roberts heard they had been called the slur by Keisling secondhand from several different people at the conference, while Keisling denied their accusations saying: "I have never used that word. If it had been in my head, it has never been in my mouth."

In response to the NCTE staff dissolution and the statements made by Roberts and Wilson, over 400 transgender community leaders penned an open letter calling for accountability at NCTE. Signatories of the letter included Andrea Jenkins, the first Black openly transgender woman elected to public office in the United States, and retired transgender mixed martial artist Fallon Fox.

After Keisling departed from NCTE in Summer 2021, the organization issued a statement committing to racial justice and accountability in the workplace which included an admission that the organization had fostered a culture of white dominance and drove out employees of color.
