= Rachel Crandall Crocker =

American activist (born 1958)

- Born: 1958 (age 67–68) Michigan, United States
- Occupation: psychotherapist; activist
- Education: Michigan State University (LMSW)
- Years active: 1997–present
- Spouse: Susan Crocker

Rachel Crandall Crocker (born 1958) is an American psychotherapist and transgender activist. She founded the community organization Transgender Michigan to improve the lives of transgender people in Michigan in 1997. In 2009, she founded the International Transgender Day of Visibility (TDOV) in response to the only other holiday for transgender people being Transgender Day of Remembrance.

== Early life ==
Crandall Crocker was born in 1958 in Michigan to a middle-class family.

In 1985, she graduated from Michigan State University with a Master of Social Work degree.

She came out as a trans woman in 1997; she lost her marriage and home and was fired from her job at a hospital.

== Career ==
After coming out in 1997, she co-founded the community organization Transgender Michigan with her now-wife, Susan Crocker; she serves as executive director. The organization provides advocacy, support, and education for the transgender community in Michigan.

She has worked as a licensed psychotherapist specializing in transgender issues since 1985. She is also a member of the National Association of Social Workers and provides training and education to therapists on transgender care.

In 2009, Crandall Crocker founded International Transgender Day of Visibility on March 31 as a "day to focus on the living," a counterpoint to Transgender Day of Remembrance. She initially promoted the event through Facebook posts, and gained greater traction after contacting transgender activist leaders around the world. Since the founding of TDOV, it has been recognized in countries around the world, including by then-President of the United States Joe Biden.

== Honors and awards ==
In September 2008, Crandall Crocker received the Liberty Bell Award from the State Bar of Michigan, which honors "outstanding citizens within the local community." She was the first transgender person to receive the award.

In September 2019, Crandall Crocker won the Torch Award, which honors "individuals whose work has impacted the lives of Transgender, Gender Non-Conforming (GNC) and Non Binary communities across the nation."

In June 2023, Crandall Crocker was recognized as a Pride Month Game Changer by the Detroit Red Wings and Detroit Tigers for her advocacy work.

In 2024, Crandall Crocker received the MSU Alumni Service Award from Michigan State University.

== Personal life ==
Crandall Crocker is a transgender woman. She lives in Michigan with her wife, Susan Crocker. She has Tourette syndrome.
