= Kavanagh v Canada (Attorney General) =

1993–2001 legal case in Canada

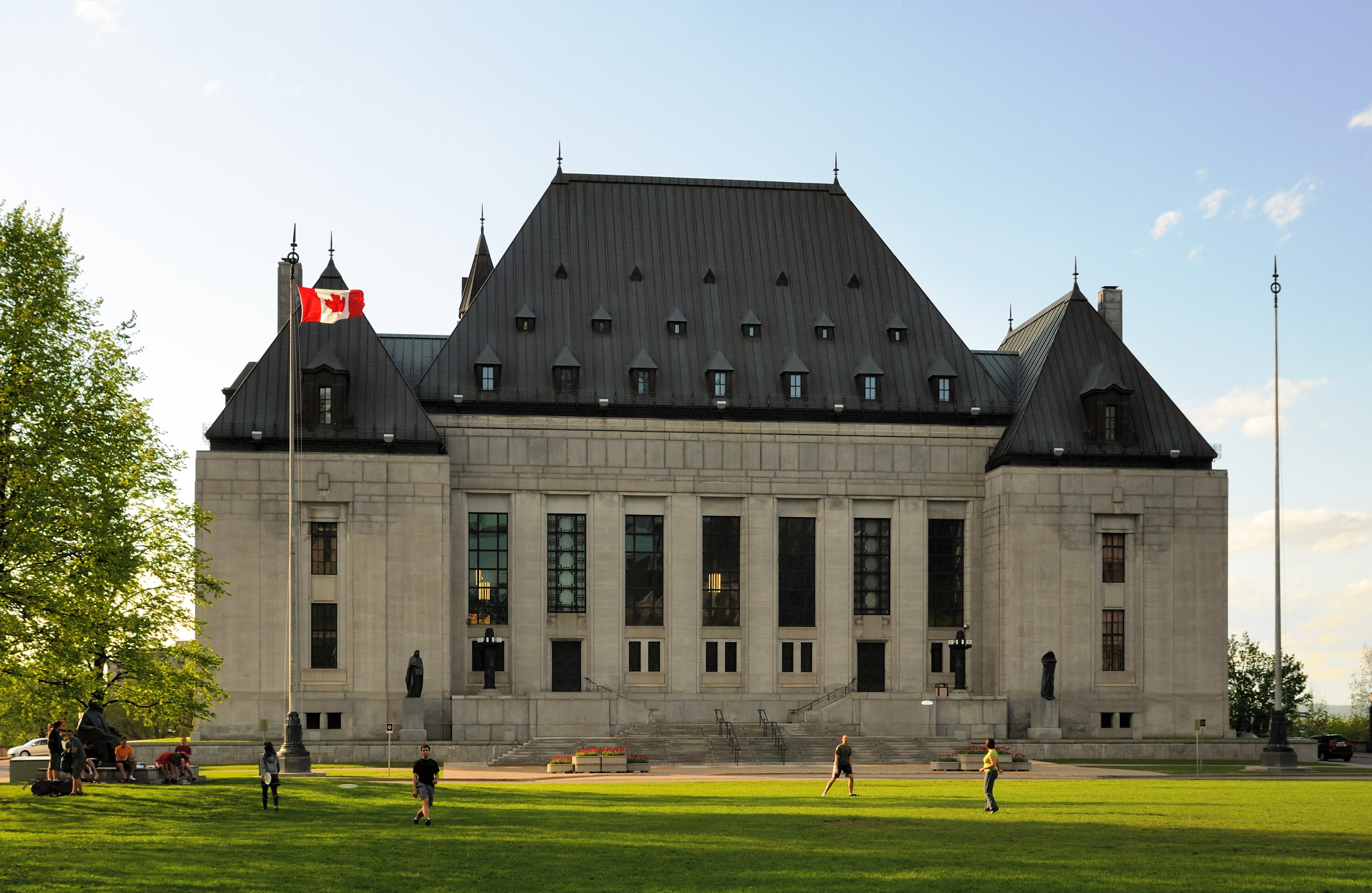
- Supreme Court of Canada
- Court: Canadian Human Rights Tribunal
- Decided: 31 August 2001
- Citation: 2001 CanLII 8496 (CHRT)

Ruling
- Discrimination on the basis of transsexualism constitutes a violation of Section 5 of the Canadian Human Rights Act. Correctional Services Canada could not provide a bona fide justification of these discriminatory practices. Synthia Kavanagh's complaints are sustained.

Case opinions
- Decision by: Anne Mactavish

Synthia Kavanagh is a transgender inmate serving time for second degree murder in Canada, who filed a human rights complaint on the basis of three claimed discriminatory actions. It was argued that Kavanagh's incarceration in a male prison, her deprival of the hormone therapies that she had previously been taking, and the lack of surgical sex-reassignment options that were available to her all constituted violations of section 5 of the Canadian Human Rights Act. Ultimately the Canadian Human Rights Tribunal ruled that incarcerating Kavanagh in a male prison and barring her from seeking sex reassignment surgery violated her fundamental rights and freedoms.

== Background ==
In September 1993, Synthia Kavanagh filed a formal complaint with the Canadian Human Rights Commission, arguing that she had been discriminated against where her sex was concerned. Kavanagh had been living as a woman, and had been taking estrogen hormonal treatment for 13 years while preparing to transition. However, as is detailed in Kavanagh's original complaint form, in 1989 she was sentenced to life imprisonment. Despite a Correctional Services Canada psychologist endorsing both Kavanagh's gender dysphoria and treatment plan, in May 1990 her hormone treatment was discontinued. Kavanagh alleged further discrimination due to her serving time in a male correctional facility, despite "…the judge strongly recommend[ing] that [she] serve [her] sentence in a female institution…"

== Canadian Corrections service policy ==
The policy on gender change in the Canadian penal system is thorough, yet according to Kavanagh and her legal counsel, discriminatory. This policy states that hormone treatment may continue while incarcerated, provided that assessment from a recognized clinic occurs. Furthermore, this policy is ambiguous where reassignment surgery is concerned—stating that such a procedure must be considered on a case-by-case basis, and "receive prior approval of the Regional Deputy Commissioner and Commissioner."

== Decision ==
Several expert opinions were called in determining whether or not Kavanagh's human rights were violated in the denial of hormones and sex reassignment surgery. One such expert was Diane Watson—the medical director of the Vancouver Hospital and Health Sciences Centre's Department of Psychiatry, and a practicing psychiatrist at the Vancouver General Hospital Gender Clinic. This clinician made the point that regardless of the sex organs present, it is "the programming of the brain which determines gender identity [which is] manifested only by three to four." It was argued that when gender dysphoria is present, there is both a medical need to address it, and precedent for doing so in a penal context.

Where Kavanagh's estrogen therapy was concerned, the psychiatrist found that as Kavanagh had been being treated for her dysphoria since she was 14 (a treatment that was discontinued only with her being served a life sentence), continuing to deprive her of this medication would be detrimental to both her health and rehabilitation. Similarly, the expert opinion was that "for the purpose of peer support and personal safety" Kavanagh should be moved to a female facility, as she would otherwise be at a higher risk of victimization. This psychiatrist came to a similar conclusion where sex-reassignment surgery was concerned—arguing that Kavanagh was a "special case" due to her "…lifelong and very clear history of transsexualism and [her] early highly intense female gender identification." Despite Kavanagh not meeting the traditional criteria of sex-reassignment surgery on the basis of her incarceration, it was argued that such a surgery would further the "…peace of mind, health and well being of [Kavanagh]…" Another expert witness took a dissenting perspective; Dr. Dickey argued that incarcerated individuals should not seek sex-reassignment surgery, as the prison setting is too artificial an environment to transition within.

Diane Watson further noted that Kavanagh attempted to harm herself several times in prison once confronted with the fact that she would be unable to seek either state-sponsored or privately paid for sex reassignment surgery. Watson concluded her assessment of Kavanagh by noting "that denial of sex reassignment surgery will seriously impair Ms. Kavanagh's ability to be stable, productive and adapt to life in or outside of prison."

Ultimately, the Canadian Human Rights Commission found liability on the part of Correctional Services Canada. Where placement was concerned, it was found that although Correctional Services Canada was "justified in not placing pre-operative transsexuals in target gender facilities…" the policies in place "…fail[] to recognize the particular vulnerability of this group of inmates…". Where Kavanagh's sex-reassignment surgery was concerned, the commission came to the conclusion that the Correctional Services Canada's policy is discriminatory both on the grounds of sex and of disability, and must therefore be suspended in order to allow a new policy to be put in place.

== See also ==
- LGBT People in Prison
- Canadian Human Rights Commission
- Canadian Human Rights Act
