= Transgender Legal Defense & Education Fund =

American civil rights organization

- Successor: Advocates for Trans Equality
- Formation: 2003; 23 years ago
- Dissolved: 2024; 2 years ago
- Type: Nonprofit
- Headquarters: New York City, United States
- Website: tldef.org

The Transgender Legal Defense & Education Fund (TLDEF) was an American civil rights organization that focuses on transgender (LGBT) equality through impact litigation and public policy work. In January 2024, TLDEF announced that they would be merging with the National Center for Transgender Equality to form a new organization, Advocates for Trans Equality. The merger was finalized in October 2024.

== History ==
TLDEF was founded in 2003 by Michael Silverman to advocate for transgender rights including health care and restroom access.

=== Executive Directors ===
Years	Name
2003–2016	Michael Silverman
2016–2018	Jillian Weiss
2018–2024	Andrea Marra

== Programs ==
TLDEF's name change project paired private attorneys with transgender clients and helped about 1,500 transgender people change their names.

Notable cases brought by the organization included In re Mathis, the successful 2013 petition of first-grader Coy Mathis to the Colorado Civil Rights Division for the right to use the restroom appropriate to her gender, and Schawe-Lane v. Amazon, in which the U.S. Equal Employment Opportunity Commission found evidence of harassment and discrimination against a husband and wife couple at the Amazon distribution center in Hebron, Kentucky, currently pending in the United States District Court for the Eastern District of Kentucky. The organization won rulings from the U.S. Equal Employment opportunity against Walmart in two cases: Robison v. Walmart, and Bost v. Walmart (also in litigation in North Carolina federal court). As a result, the Human Rights Campaign suspended Walmart's rating in its Corporate Equality Index.
