= Estelle v. Gamble =

- Supreme Court of the United States

Argued October 5, 1976 Decided November 30, 1976
- Full case name: Estelle, Corrections Director, et al. v. J. W. Gamble
- Citations: 429 U.S. 97 (more) 97 S. Ct. 285; 50 L. Ed. 2d 251; 1976 U.S. LEXIS 175

Holding
- In order to state a cognizable Section 1983 claim for a violation of Eighth Amendment rights, a prisoner must allege acts or omissions sufficiently harmful to evidence deliberate indifference to serious medical needs, and that medical malpractice did not rise to the level of "cruel and unusual punishment" simply because the victim was a prisoner.

Court membership
- Chief Justice Warren E. Burger Associate Justices William J. Brennan Jr. · Potter Stewart; Byron White · Thurgood Marshall; Harry Blackmun · Lewis F. Powell Jr. William Rehnquist · John P. Stevens

Case opinions
- Majority: Marshall, joined by Burger, Brennan, Stewart, White, Powell, Rehnquist
- Concurrence: Blackmun (in the judgment)
- Dissent: Stevens

Estelle v. Gamble, 429 U.S. 97 (1976), was a case in which the Supreme Court of the United States established the standard of what a prisoner must plead in order to claim a violation of Eighth Amendment rights under 42 U.S.C. § 1983. Specifically, the Court held that a prisoner must allege acts or omissions sufficiently harmful to evidence deliberate indifference to serious medical needs. Though the Court credited Gamble's complaint that doctors had failed to provide appropriate care, it held that medical malpractice did not rise to the level of "cruel and unusual punishment" simply because the victim is a prisoner.

== Background ==
J. W. Gamble was a state prisoner within the Texas Department of Corrections who was given a prison labor assignment loading and unloading cotton bales from a truck. On November 9, 1973, he injured his back when a cotton bale fell on him. He continued to work for a few more hours until his back was completely stiff. He was ultimately granted permission to visit the hospital unit. A medical assistant checked him for a hernia and returned him to his cell. Soon after, the pain became intolerable, so he returned to the hospital unit. Ultimately, a doctor diagnosed him with a lower back strain and provided him with pain medication, including a muscle relaxant. Gamble was also given “cell-pass,” which permitted him to stay in his cell for two days. A few days later, he was evaluated and given the same medication and orders to remain in his cell for another seven days. On November 26, he was ordered to stay in his cell.

Over the next three months, he complained of back and chest pains, was subject to administrative segregation for refusing to work, and ultimately was treated for an irregular heartbeat.

On December 3, Despite Gambles's protest and complaints of pain, his doctor took him off "cell-pass," claiming he could begin light work. Two days later, he was sent to the disciplinary committee for failing to work. The committee sent him to a doctor the next day, who performed multiple tests and prescribed him Ser-Ap-Es for his high blood pressure and Febridyne for his pain. He continued to be prescribed medication by multiple doctors, including instances where he was not able to have his prescription filled for four days. In January, Gamble was ordered to work and continued to refuse due to his pain. Eventually, on January 31, Gamble went back to the disciplinary committee, where a medical assistant who was treating him told them Gamble was "in first-class medical condition."

Four days later, on February 4, at 8 A.M., Gamble asked to see a doctor for chest pains and "blank outs." It was not until 7:30 that night that a medical assistant examined him and ordered him hospitalized. The following day, Dr. Heaton performed an electrocardiogram; one day later Gamble was placed on Quinidine for treatment of irregular cardiac rhythm and moved to administrative segregation. On February 7, Gamble again experienced pain in his chest, left arm, and back and asked to see a doctor. The guards refused. He asked again the next day. The guards again refused. Finally, on February 9, he was allowed to see Dr. Heaton, who ordered the Quinidine continued for three more days.

=== Lawsuit ===
On February 11, 1974, Gamble initiated a Section 1983 lawsuit pro se against W. J. Estelle, Jr., the Director of the Department of Corrections; H. H. Husbands, the warden of the prison; and Dr. Ralph Gray, the medical director of the Department and chief medical officer of the prison hospital. In his complaint, Gamble alleged that he received inadequate treatment for a back injury he sustained while engaging in prison work.

The district court dismissed Gamble's complaint for failure to state a claim. The Fifth Circuit Court of Appeals reversed the dismissal, finding a cognizable claim for the insufficiency of the medical treatment. The defendants appealed to the Supreme Court of the United States, which granted certiorari.

== Opinion of the court ==
Due to the failure to state a claim, the Supreme Court addressed Gamble's complaint as if it was a claim that the state had violated his rights under the Eighth Amendment. The Court stated: "[r]egardess of how evidenced, deliberate indifference to a prisoner's serious illness or injury states a cause of action under § 1983." Thus, the Court decided whether the defendant’s conduct amounted to cruel and unusual punishment.

In a 8–1 decision, the Court reversed the court of appeals' decision regarding Dr. Gray. The Court reversed and remanded for further proceedings on whether there is a cause of action against Estelle and Husbands.

The Court found for the defendants because it viewed Gamble's failure to receive proper medical care as "inadvertent". The case nevertheless established the principle that the deliberate failure of prison authorities to address the medical needs of an inmate constitutes "cruel and unusual punishment". It held that "deliberate indifference to serious medical needs of prisoners constitutes the 'unnecessary and wanton infliction of pain'...proscribed by the Eighth Amendment."

== Subsequent developments ==
=== Helling v. McKinney ===
The Supreme Court in 1993 extended the requirement that inmates receive required medical care beyond what it established in Estelle. In Helling v. McKinney, the Court considered the case of a Nevada prisoner, "the cellmate of a five-pack-a-day smoker," who sought to be housed in an environment free of second-hand smoke. McKinney suffered from no ailment and sought no medical treatment. Justice Byron White wrote for a 7−2 majority of the Court that McKinney's claim that prison officials "have, with deliberate indifference, exposed him to levels of ETS [second hand smoke] that pose an unreasonable risk of serious damage to his future health" raised a valid claim under the Eighth Amendment. He wrote that McKinney would have to prove both the scientific facts of the dangers of exposure to second-hand smoke and prove that community standards supported him, that "it violates contemporary standards of decency to expose anyone unwillingly to such a risk. In other words, the prisoner must show that the risk of which he complains is not one that today's society chooses to tolerate." He would also have to prove that prison officials acted with deliberate indifference.

Since Helling, courts have evaluated whether prison medical care gives rise to an Eight Amendment violation using an objective and subjective standard. To establish a claim, the plaintiff must furnish evidence that objectively shows "that the seriousness of the potential harm and the likelihood of such injury were so grave that exposing anyone to such a risk would violate contemporary standards of decency." Then, the court looks at the prison's intent and asks: "[w]ere they aware of allegedly dangerous jail conditions that they deliberately ignored?"

=== Legislative updates ===
The Americans with Disabilities Act (ADA) of 1990 has been used by incarcerated litigants bringing claims against correctional healthcare violations. “Under Title II of the ADA, ‘no qualified individual with a disability shall […] be excluded from participation in or be denied the benefits of the services, programs, or activities of a public entity.

The Prison Litigation Reform Act (PLRA) is a federal law enacted in 1996 in the United States. The PLRA was designed to limit the ability of prisoners to file lawsuits concerning the conditions of their confinement.

== See also ==
- List of United States Supreme Court cases involving mental health
- DeShaney v. Winnebago County
- Farmer v. Brennan
- Davis v. City of Las Vegas (9th Cir. 2007)
