= Farmer v. Brennan =

- Supreme Court of the United States

Argued January 12, 1994 Decided June 6, 1994
- Full case name: Dee Farmer, Petitioner v. Edward Brennan, Warden, et al.
- Docket no.: 92-7247
- Citations: 511 U.S. 825 (more) 114 S. Ct. 1970; 128 L. Ed. 2d 811
- Argument: Oral argument
- Opinion announcement: Opinion announcement

Case history
- Prior: 11 F.3d 668 (7th Cir. 1992); cert. granted, 510 U.S. 811 (1993).
- Subsequent: Vacated and remanded, 28 F.3d 1216 (7th Cir. 1994); appeal after remand, 81 F.3d 1444 (7th Cir. 1996).

Holding
- The "deliberate indifference" of an official at a prison to the substantial risk of any serious harm against an inmate is a violation of the Eighth Amendment.

Court membership
- Chief Justice William Rehnquist Associate Justices Harry Blackmun · John P. Stevens; Sandra Day O'Connor · Antonin Scalia; Anthony Kennedy · David Souter; Clarence Thomas · Ruth Bader Ginsburg

Case opinions
- Majority: Souter, joined by Rehnquist, Blackmun, Stevens, O'Connor, Scalia, Kennedy, Ginsburg
- Concurrence: Blackmun
- Concurrence: Stevens
- Concurrence: Thomas (in judgment)

Laws applied
- U.S. Const. Amend. VIII

Farmer v. Brennan, 511 U.S. 825 (1994), was a case in which the Supreme Court of the United States ruled that a prison official's "deliberate indifference" to a substantial risk of serious harm to an inmate violates the cruel and unusual punishment clause of the Eighth Amendment. Farmer built on two previous Supreme Court decisions addressing prison conditions, Estelle v. Gamble and Wilson v. Seiter. The decision marked the first time the Supreme Court directly addressed sexual assault in prisons.

== Background ==
=== Dee Farmer ===
Dee Farmer, a trans woman, was convicted of credit card fraud in 1986, and was initially incarcerated at the Federal Correctional Institution, Oxford, a medium-security federal prison for men. Farmer was incarcerated with the general male population due to federal prison guidelines that assigned trans prisoners to facilities based on medical transition status. In 1989, Farmer was transferred to the general male population at US Penitentiary Terre Haute, Indiana, a higher security facility that housed "more troublesome prisoners." Within two weeks of arriving at the penitentiary, Farmer was beaten and sexually assaulted by another inmate in her cell, which potentially exposed her to HIV infection.

Farmer subsequently filed a Bivens lawsuit in federal court without a lawyer, alleging that the wardens of both of her prisons and other officials within the Federal Bureau of Prisons violated her Eighth Amendment rights. In an amended filing, she specified that the prison administration was deliberately indifferent to her safety when it transferred her to a general male prison population with a history of inmate violence, knowing that she would be particularly vulnerable to rape as a trans woman.

=== Procedural history ===
==== District Court ====
The District Court granted defendants' motion for summary judgment, denying Farmer's motion to delay its ruling until the defendants complied with a discovery request. It concluded that failure to prevent inmate assaults violates the Eighth Amendment only if prison officials had "actual knowledge" of a potential danger, and that respondents lacked such knowledge because Farmer never expressed any safety concerns to them.

==== Court of Appeals ====
The Seventh Circuit Court of Appeals affirmed the District Court in a short memorandum opinion, noting that any issues that could be raised on appeal were "insubstantial," and the parties did not need to submit any briefs for the court to consider.

=== Consideration by the Supreme Court ===
==== Petition for certiorari ====
The Supreme Court granted Farmer's petition for certiorari from the Seventh Circuit decision, in order to resolve disagreement among different Courts of Appeals regarding the proper test to assess "deliberate indifference" of officials.

==== Merits briefs & oral arguments ====
After the Supreme Court granted certiorari, the ACLU National Prison Project stepped in to represent Farmer. In their briefing before the Court and at oral argument, Farmer and the ACLU argued that deliberate indifference should be defined objectively, where deliberate official indifference to obvious risks that are likely to result in the violation of constitutional rights is sufficient for a plaintiff to show an Eighth Amendment violation. This standard is akin to the recklessness standard used in civil cases. The federal government argued that the Court should adopt a test more similar to criminal recklessness, which would require that a plaintiff show that the prison official had actual knowledge of the substantial risk of serious harm.

ACLU attorney Elizabeth Alexander used Farmer's proper pronouns in her briefs and at oral arguments, while lawyers for the federal government used male pronouns.

==== Amicus briefs ====
Amicus briefs were filed in favor of reversing the Seventh Circuit on behalf of the Montana Defender Project, the D.C. Prisoners' Legal Services Project, and Stop Prisoner Rape. An amicus brief in favor of affirming the Seventh Circuit was filed on by the Attorney General of Maryland, which was joined by all other state attorneys general.

The brief filed by Stop Prisoner Rape emphasized that prison rape is "widespread, repetitive, deadly, devastating, predictable, and preventable," but is rarely reported because it is "ingrained in the culture of confinement, both among prisoners and prison officials." In order to address this issue, the brief asked the Court to use Farmer's case to add pressure to prison officials to bring about systemic prison reforms, and to create greater access to the courts for survivors of prison rape.

== Opinion of the court ==
The U.S. Supreme Court ruled in a 9–0 decision that "deliberate indifference" to a substantial risk of harm to an inmate can render a prison official liable under the Eighth Amendment. Justice David Souter wrote the majority opinion, and was joined by Chief Justice William Rehnquist, along with Justices Harry Blackmun, John Paul Stevens, Sandra Day O'Connor, Antonin Scalia, Anthony Kennedy, and Ruth Bader Ginsburg. Justices Blackmun and Stevens also wrote separate concurring opinions. Justice Clarence Thomas wrote a concurring opinion joining in the judgment, but disagreed with the majority's reasoning.

=== Majority opinion ===
The majority opinion of the court held a prison official could be held liable under the Eighth Amendment if they are "deliberately indifferent" to a substantial risk of serious harm to a prisoner. The court explained that the Eighth Amendment requires prison officials to provide humane conditions of confinement, which includes provision of "adequate food, clothing, shelter, and medical care," and taking "reasonable measures" to ensure inmate safety. In particular, prison officials have a duty to prevent harm from other prisoners. In order to prove that a constitutional rights violation occurred, however, an inmate must show (1) a substantial risk of serious harm and (2) that the prison official was deliberately indifferent to inmate health and safety.

The court then proceeded to clarify what qualified as "deliberate indifference". Under the deliberate indifference standard, a prison official must actually know of and disregard an excessive risk to inmate health and safety. The court explained that this is a subjective standard, under which the official must be aware of facts that would lead to an inference that a substantial risk of serious harm exists, and then must also draw that inference.

Applying this standard to Farmer's case, the court noted that the district court mistakenly relied on the fact that Farmer never notified the guards of her risk of being assaulted in granting the defendants' motion for summary judgment. Notification was not required under the deliberate indifference standard, and Farmer could use other circumstantial evidence to prove actual knowledge, such as admissions by prison guards that she was likely to face "a great deal of sexual pressure" in prison. Consequently, the court vacated the judgment by the court of appeals and remanded the case to the district court for further proceedings.

=== Concurrences ===
==== Justice Blackmun ====
Justice Blackmun's concurring opinion went further by saying that the government was responsible for the conditions inside, regardless of a prison or government official's subjective state of mind:

Where a legislature refuses to fund a prison adequately, the resulting barbaric conditions should not be immune from constitutional scrutiny simply because no prison official acted culpably....The responsibility for subminimal conditions in any prison inevitably is diffuse, and often borne at least in part, by the legislature. Yet, regardless of what state actor or institution caused the harm and with what intent, the experience of the inmate is the same. A punishment is simply no less cruel or unusual because its harm is unintended. In view of this obvious fact, there is no reason to believe that, in adopting the Eighth Amendment, the Framers intended to prohibit cruel and unusual punishments only when they were inflicted intentionally.

==== Justice Stevens ====
Justice Stevens wrote a short concurring opinion noting that he agreed with Justice Blackmun, but joined in Justice Souter's majority opinion because it more closely followed the court's precedent.

==== Justice Thomas ====
Justice Thomas concurred in the judgment only, explaining that conditions of confinement should not violate the Eighth Amendment unless they are imposed as part of a sentence. In Farmer's case, because the attack "was not part of [her] sentence, it did not constitute 'punishment' under the Eighth Amendment." However, he agreed that a "deliberate indifference" standard should govern prison official liability, and therefore concurred in the court's ruling.

== Subsequent developments ==
=== Farmer on remand ===
The District Court again granted summary judgment against Farmer on remand. This second summary judgment was overturned by the Court of Appeals for not giving Farmer a meaningful chance to seek discovery in her case. The subsequent trial lasted only two days, and the jury found for defendants after deliberating for one hour. The jury found that there was insufficient evidence presented to prove that Farmer's sexual assault had occurred.

During her time in federal and state prison, Farmer became a jailhouse lawyer, peer educator, and prisoner advocate. Her diagnosis with HIV led a Maryland judge to reduce her sentence to time served, allowing her to enroll in a HIV medication trial, overcoming an initial prognosis of a year. Farmer was released from state prison in 2020. Farmer established Fight4Justice, a nonprofit focused on assisting currently and formerly incarcerated persons, especially LGBTQ detainees.

=== Subsequent cases ===
Tens of thousands of cases in the lower courts have cited Farmer's case and the legal standard it established. Farmer also continues to have an impact on jailhouse lawyers. By carefully explaining how to argue constitutional violations behind bars, defining complex legal terms like “subjective recklessness” and mapping out a successful claim, Justice Souter's majority opinion serves as a roadmap for Eighth Amendment prison condition litigation. Nonetheless, the "actual knowledge" focus of the standard adopted by the Court in Brennan sets a high bar for plaintiffs that can often prove difficult to surmount. These claims became even more difficult to pursue after the Supreme Court's decision in Ashcroft v. Iqbal, which established a strict plausibility pleading standard, and makes it difficult for inmate plaintiffs to survive a motion to dismiss without clear evidence of prison officials' actual knowledge of their substantial risk of harm.

=== Legacy ===
Stop Prisoner Rape lauded the decision as a "historic breakthrough" in efforts to end "the widespread and institutionalized practice of rape of prisoners." The attention that the case brought to sexual assault in prisons, especially for trans inmates, helped to spur policy changes as well. Nine years later, Congress passed the Prison Rape Elimination Act of 2003 and both the House and Senate referenced Farmer in floor debates regarding the bill. In 2012, the Department of Justice announced regulations implementing the PREA, including specific protections for transgender people that referred to Farmer expressly. The final rule implemented by the DOJ explained that placement decisions for trans inmates must be made on a case-by-case basis, and should entail consideration of whether a placement would ensure the inmate's health and safety, with serious consideration given to the inmate's own views regarding their own safety.

== See also ==
- List of LGBTQ-related cases in the United States Supreme Court
- Prison rape in the United States
