= Erika Castellanos =

Belizean human rights activist

Erika Castellanos (born 1975 or 1976) is a Belizean human rights activist, advocating especially for HIV-positive people and sex workers. In 2023, she became executive director of Global Action for Trans Equality (GATE).

== Biography ==
Erika Castellanos was born in Belize. She moved to Mexico in the 1990s, finding a more tolerant climate for LGBTQ people there, especially transgender women.

In 1995, Castellanos was diagnosed as HIV-positive, with a two-year life expectancy. She remained in Mexico to receive the necessary care. Upon her return to Belize, she encountered very marked serophobia in the medical community, and turned to drug use and sex work.

In 2009 or 2010, Castellanos and some relatives created a network of HIV-positive people in Belize, after being invited to a training workshop organized by the Global Fund to Fight AIDS, Tuberculosis and Malaria (Global Fund). From 2011 to 2016, she was executive director of the Collaborative Network for Persons Living with HIV (C-NET+) – Belize. In this position, she coordinated the assistance received through the Global Fund at the national level. She studied in parallel at the University of Belize, then completed the University of Pittsburgh's LGBT health research certification in May 2015.

In April 2017, Castellanos joined Global Action for Trans Equality (GATE), an international LGBT rights organization that works in partnership with the Joint United Nations Programme on HIV/AIDS (UNAIDS), as a program director. In February 2022, she became acting executive director of the organization, then executive director in January 2023. During this period, she moved to the Netherlands, married and had two children.

On June 1, 2018, Castellanos became the first openly transgender person appointed to the Board of Directors of the Global Fund.

== See also ==
- Violence against LGBTQ people in Belize
