= Fields v. Smith =

2011 transgender rights case in Wisconsin

- Court: United States Court of Appeals for the Seventh Circuit
- Decided: October 28, 2011

Fields v. Smith, 653 F.3d 550 (7th Cir. 2011), was a case in Wisconsin involving inmates' right to hormonal therapies or sex reassignment surgeries.

== Background ==
A law in Wisconsin prohibited prison doctors from using hormonal therapies or sex reassignment surgeries to treat inmates with gender identity disorder (GID). Several inmates in Wisconsin prisons brought the lawsuit to declare the law facially unconstitutional.

== Trial court ==
After an evidentiary hearing in front of the United States District Court for the Eastern District of Wisconsin, the judge found that the Wisconsin law violated the Eighth and Fourteenth Amendments.

== Result ==
After the trial court's decision, the State of Wisconsin appealed to the United States Court of Appeals for the Seventh Circuit. The Seventh Circuit affirmed the District Court's ruling on October 28, 2011.
