= Masen Davis =

American transgender rights activist

- Born: March 29, 1971 (age 55); Missouri, U.S.
- Education: Northwestern University (BA); University of California, Los Angeles (MSW)

Masen Davis (born March 29, 1971) is an American transgender rights activist who is currently the interim executive director of Transgender Europe, and was previously the executive director of Freedom for All Americans and of the Transgender Law Center.

== Early life ==
Davis was born in Missouri, moving around the state with his father, a Methodist minister, from church to church.

Davis earned his Bachelor of Arts degree at Northwestern University in 1993, living in Chicago from 1989 to 1995. He earned his masters of social welfare at the University of California Los Angeles in 2002.

Davis came out as a transgender man in 1998 while in California. As of 2014, Davis had still been unable to update his Missouri birth certificate's name and gender marker.

== Advocacy career ==
Masen began his career working at Horizons Community Services, now Center on Halsted, in Chicago.

He moved to California in 1995, joining the United Way of Greater Los Angeles, first as community investment officer and later as development director.

In 2007, Davis was appointed executive director of the Transgender Law Center, where his work helped eliminate insurance exclusions for transgender Californians, as well as helped pass the School Success and Opportunity Act to improve access to facilities and activities for transgender California students. Under his tenure, TLC's prominence as a national transgender advocacy organization grew, while the staff grew from four to fourteen.

In 2012, Davis completed Harvard University's John F. Kennedy School of Government program for Senior Executives in State and Local Government as a David Bohnett Foundation LGBTQ Victory Institute Leadership Fellow.

After leaving TLC in 2015, Davis then served as interim co-director for Global Action for Trans Equality from 2015 to 2016, followed by the senior director of special projects for the Gill Foundation in 2017.

From November 2017 to 2019, Davis was the CEO for Freedom for All Americans. Davis is currently the interim executive director of Transgender Europe, an organization with affiliates in 46 countries, throughout Europe, Central Asia, as well as in Russia and Iceland.

In 2019, Davis was recognized with a Trans Equality Now Award by the National Center for Transgender Equality.

In 2022, Davis was appointed executive director of Funders Concerned About AIDS (FCAA), which tracks and mobilizes philanthropic efforts to end the HIV epidemic.

== Published work ==
Masen contributed a chapter to Columbia University Press's 2006 book, Sexual Orientation and Gender Expression in Social Work Practice. He coauthored with Kris Hayashi an essay on the Transgender Law Center published in The SAGE Encyclopedia of Trans Studies.
