= Transgender Law Center =

American civil rights organization

- Formation: 2002; 24 years ago
- Founded at: San Francisco, California, United States
- Purpose: transgender law
- Region served: United States
- Method: Campaigning, advocacy, lobbying, research
- Key people: Shelby Chestnut (executive director)
- Website: transgenderlawcenter.org

The Transgender Law Center (TLC) is the largest American transgender-led civil rights organization in the United States. They were originally California's first "fully staffed, state-wide transgender legal organization" and were initially a fiscally sponsored project of the National Center for Lesbian Rights.

Since launching in 2002, TLC has held over 250 transgender law workshops providing legal information to more than 3,250 community members, attorneys, social service providers, and business owners, as well as collaborated on public policy initiatives designed to improve safety in schools and prisons and safe access to public restrooms for transgender people in San Francisco. TLC helped to revise San Francisco's "Regulations to Prohibit Gender Identity Discrimination" in December 2003, making them more inclusive of people who do not identify as strictly female or male, and to pass legislation in the City of Oakland banning gender identity discrimination in housing, employment, public accommodation, and city services.

== History and legal work ==
The Transgender Law Center was launched in 2002 in San Francisco by law school graduates Dylan Vade and Chris Daley with funding from the Echoing Green Foundation. The stated mission of TLC is to connect transgender people and their families to technically sound and culturally competent legal services, increase acceptance and enforcement of laws and policies that support California's transgender communities, and work to change laws and systems that fail to incorporate the needs and experiences of transgender people. TLC uses direct legal services, public policy advocacy, and educational opportunities to advance the rights and safety of diverse transgender communities.

The Transgender Law Center helped to revise San Francisco's "Regulations to Prohibit Gender Identity Discrimination" in December 2003, making them more inclusive of people who do not identify as strictly female or male, and to pass legislation in the City of Oakland banning gender identity discrimination in housing, employment, public accommodation, and city services.

In 2015, the TLC joined a lawsuit filed against the California Department of Corrections and Rehabilitation that resulted in a settlement that established a precedent of the state providing gender-affirming medical care. In 2016, the TLC and co-counsel filed a suit on behalf of a transgender high schooler who was prohibited from using the boys' bathroom. In 2017 the Seventh Circuit Court of Appeals unanimously ruled in favor of the student, finding that the school's policy violated Title IX and the Equal Protection Clause of the 14th Amendment.

On May 21, 2018, members of the TLC and the Transgender Education Network of Texas were denied service at an IHOP restaurant in Nashville, Tennessee. The IHOP issued an apology.

== Transgender economic health ==
The survey Good Jobs NOW!, conducted jointly by the Transgender Law Center and the San Francisco Bay Guardian in 2006, provided data on the economic reality experienced by transgender people and their families. The team surveyed 194 self-identified transgender people living, working, or looking for work in San Francisco. Survey findings included:

- Nearly 60% of respondents earned under $15,300 annually
- 40% did not have a bank account
- Only 25% were working full-time
- 10% were homeless

A statewide survey, "The State of Transgender California Report", was conducted in 2008. Findings included that respondents were more than twice as likely to live under the poverty line as the general population.
