= CHP =

CHP may refer to:

== Law enforcement ==
- California Highway Patrol

== Politics ==
- Christian Heritage Party (disambiguation)
- Christian Historical Party (1903–1908), a Dutch conservative party
- Republican People's Party (Cumhuriyet Halk Partisi), a Turkish centre-left party

== Chemistry and biology ==
- Collagen hybridizing peptide
- CHP (gene)
- Chp (GTPase)
- Cumene hydroperoxide
- Capillary hydrostatic pressure, a component of the Starling equation
- N-cyclohexyl-2-pyrrolidone (liquid solvent)
- Chemical formula of Methylidynephosphane

== Energy ==
- Combined heat and power, a power plant using a heat engine to generate electricity and useful heat simultaneously.

== Healthcare ==
- UPMC Children's Hospital of Pittsburgh
- Community Health Partnerships, Scotland
- Certified Health Physicist, United States, a specialist in radiation protection and safety
- Centre for Health Protection, an agency of Hong Kong
- Cricohyoidopexy, a surgical procedure

== Transport ==
- Chipstead railway station, Surrey, England, National Rail station code
- Ferrocarril Chihuahua al Pacífico railway, reporting mark

== Other ==
- Cultural Heritage Park, a cultural center in Taichung, Taiwan
- Covering homotopy property
