= CCHP =

CCHP may refer to:

- Certified Correctional Health Professional
- Certified Corporate Housing Professional; see National Commission on Correctional Health Care
- consortium of computational human phantoms
- Combined cooling, heat and power, also known as trigeneration
- constant conductance heat pipe
- Chinese Community Health Plan at the San Francisco Chinese Hospital
- Moscow Central Clinical Hospital (CCHP: Central Clinical Hospital of the Administrative directorate of the President of the Russian Federation)

== See also ==
- CHP (disambiguation)
