= Incarceration of women in the United States =

Topic page on incarceration of women

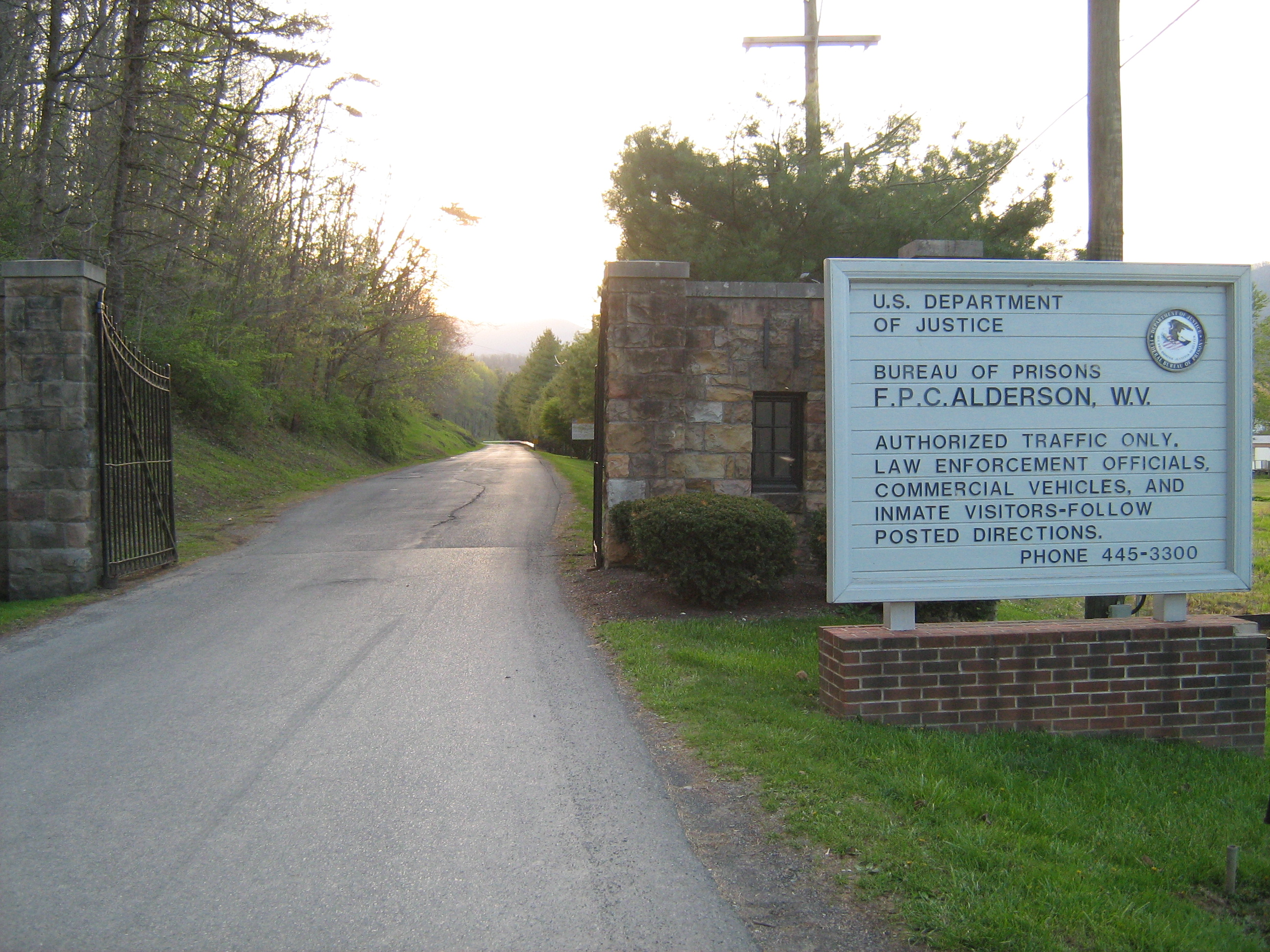
Federal Prison Camp, Alderson, a Federal Bureau of Prisons facility for women in West Virginia

The incarceration of women in the United States refers to the imprisonment of women in both prisons and jails in the United States. There are approximately 219,000 incarcerated women in the US according to a November 2018 report by the Prison Policy Initiative, and the rate of incarceration of women in the United States is at a historic and global high, with 133 women in correctional facilities per every 100,000 female citizens. The United States is home to just 4% of the world's female population, yet the US is responsible for 33% of the entire world's incarcerated female population. The steep rise in the population of incarcerated women in the US is linked to the complex history of the war on drugs and the US's prison–industrial complex, which lead to mass incarceration among many demographics, but had particularly dramatic impacts on women and especially women of color. However, women made up only 10.4% of the US prison and jail population, as of 2015.

The conditions of correctional facilities which house women can be a major cause of health and human rights concerns. Given that the steep rise in the population of incarcerated women has been a relatively recent phenomenon, prisons and jails originally built to accommodate male prisoners have not been adjusted to meet the special needs of women, like providing pregnancy and prenatal care, other gynecological services, mental healthcare, and adequate accommodation for things like menstrual hygiene. Issues with standards of care and adequate prison conditions are worsened by a lack of standards on data collecting and also by the privatization of prison healthcare services, which cannot be as tightly regulated as public services.

== Prison and jail population ==
In the United States in 2015, women made up 10.4% of the incarcerated population in adult prisons and jails. Between 2000 and 2010, the number of males in prison grew by 1.4% per annum, while the number of females grew by 1.9% per annum. From 2010 to 2013, the numbers fell for both genders, −0.8% for males and −0.5% for females. For jails the figures for 2000–2010 are 1.8% for males and 2.6% for females, while for 2010–2013 they are −1.4% for males and 3.4% for females. Over this period the female proportion of the incarcerated population has been increasing, at least partly due to compulsory sentencing.

In the late 20th century, Hispanic women were incarcerated at nearly twice the rate of non-Hispanic white women, and black women were incarcerated at four times the rate of white women. However, since the 2000s, the incarceration rates for African American and Hispanic American women have declined, while incarceration rates have increased for non-Hispanic white women. Between 2000 and 2017, the incarceration rate for white women increased by 44%, while at the same time declining by 55% for African American women. The Sentencing Project reports that by 2021, incarceration rates had declined by 70% for African American women, while rising by 7% for white women. In 2017, the Washington Post reported that white women's incarceration rate was growing faster than ever before, as the rate for black women declined. The incarceration rate of African American males is also falling sharply, even faster that white men's incarceration rate, contrary to the popular opinion that black males are increasingly incarcerated.

The Prison Policy Initiative writes: "Incarcerated women are 53% White, 29% Black, 14% Hispanic, 2.5% American Indian and Alaskan Native, 0.9% Asian, and 0.4% Native Hawaiian and Pacific Islander."

Within the US, the rate of female incarceration increased fivefold in a two-decade span ending in 2001; the increase occurred because of increased prosecutions and convictions of offenses related to recreational drugs, increases in the severity of offenses, and a lack of community sanctions and treatment for women who violate drug laws. Tough-on-crime legislation and legislation associated with the war on drugs have been connected to the increasing rate of the incarceration of women of color from lower socioeconomic backgrounds. This rapid boom of female prisoners is something the primarily male-dominated prison system was not structurally prepared for and, as a result, female prisons often lack the resources to accommodate the specific social, mental, healthcare needs of these women. Many reforms aiming to reduce prison populations have been designed with only men in mind and have thus not helped reduce the number of incarcerated women; this is especially true of state-level reforms. The mass incarceration of females in the US has become a major human rights issue that has been widely criticized by international organizations such as Human Rights Watch.

== History ==
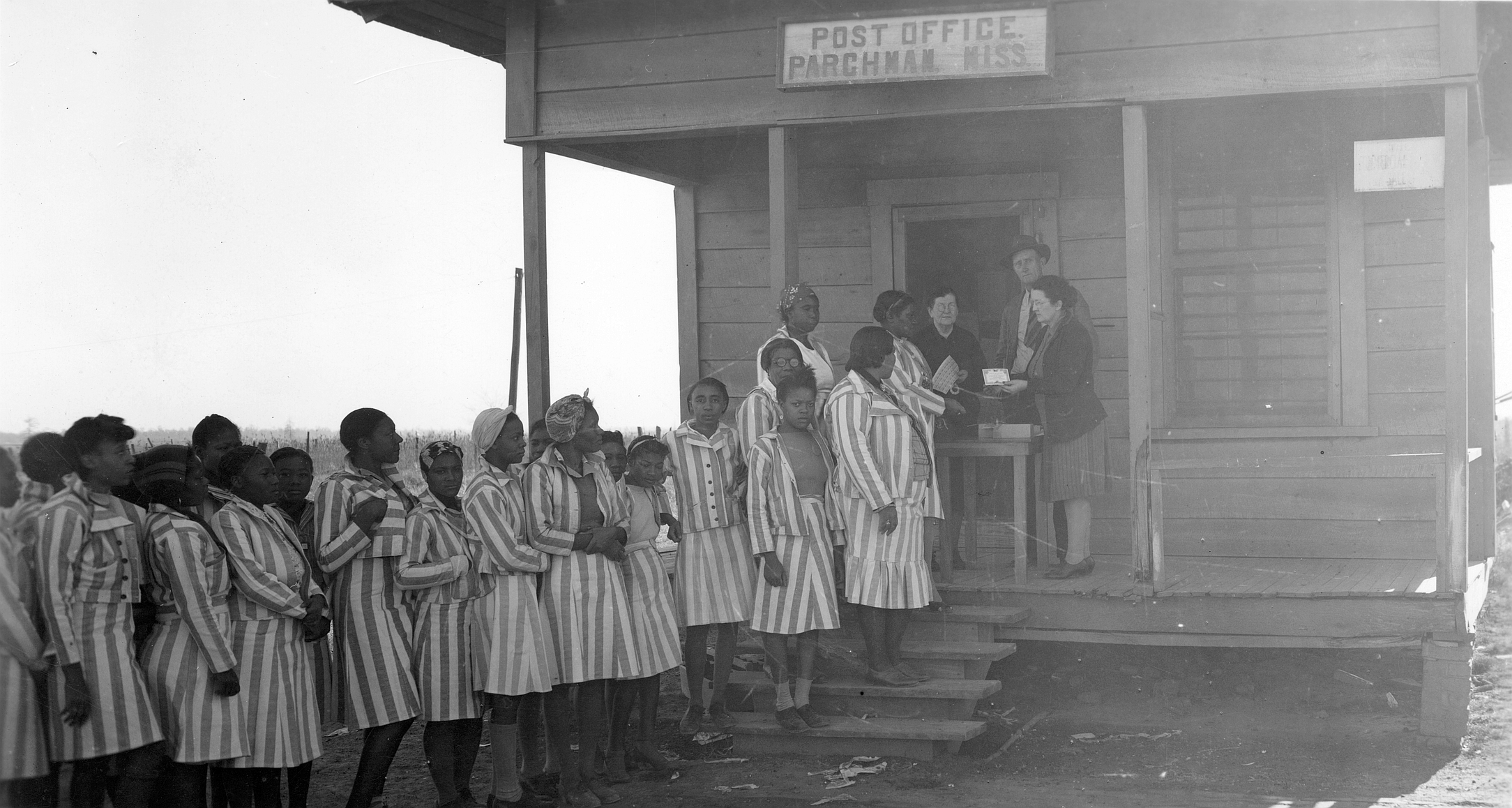
Women prisoners at the Mississippi State Penitentiary (Parchman) post office in Sunflower County, Mississippi, c. 1930

In the United States, authorities began housing women in correctional facilities separate from men in the 1870s. The first American female correctional facility with dedicated buildings and staff was the Mount Pleasant Female Prison in Ossining, New York; the facility had some operational dependence on nearby Sing Sing, a men's prison.

Unlike prisons designed for men in the United States, state prisons for women evolved in three waves, as described in historical detail in "Partial Justice: Women in State Prisons" by Nicole Hahn Rafter. First, women prisoners were imprisoned alongside men in "general population", where they were subject to sexual attacks and daily forms of degradation. Then, in a partial attempt to address these issues, women prisoners were removed from general population and housed separately, but then subject to neglect wherein they did not receive the same resources as men in prisons. In a third stage of development, women in prison were then housed completely separately in fortress-like prisons, where the goal of punishment was to indoctrinate women into traditional feminine roles.

Despite the widespread historical shifts in female incarceration, there have been documented instances of women being held in men's prisons well into the twentieth century, one such example being the nearly two years that Assata Shakur was imprisoned, primarily in men's facilities, in the 1970s. In 1973 Shakur was held in the Middlesex County Jail in New Jersey, supposedly due to its proximity to the courthouse. She was the first, and last, woman ever imprisoned there, and was held in deplorable conditions including isolation and twenty-four hour observation. While Shakur was eventually transferred to a women's prison, her treatment illustrates the fact that women were held in male facilities far into the twentieth century.

Some fifty years ago, President Lyndon Johnson called for a "war on crime". Consequently, Johnson presented to Congress the Law Enforcement Assistance Act, which allowed for the first time in America, a "direct role for the Federal Government in local police operations, court systems, and state prisons." Republican and Democratic policymakers worked together in fighting this war on crime, which would later become a war on drugs. The term "war on drugs" was officially introduced during the Nixon administration to condemn all unapproved drug use, and it refers to federal, state, and local government policies created to eliminate drug use within specific communities.

The Reagan administration further pressed the sales of illegal drugs as a critical political issue. President Reagan's Comprehensive Crime Control Act of 1984 focused on the activities of inner-city youth and small-time drug dealers. Severe sentencing laws, especially mandatory minimum sentences, which were a part of Reagan's crime bill and the Anti-Drug Abuse Act of 1986 engendered mass increase in imprisonment. For example, between 1980 and 1998 the U.S. incarceration rate rose almost 300 percent. The passage of the United States Federal Sentencing Guidelines also compelled judges to give lengthy sentences even when they believed the defendant was not a threat to society. In 1984, Congress also enacted statutes imposing mandatory minimum sentences for drug and weapons offenses, as well as adopted definitions of "drug related activities" and harsh sentences for those with any connection to drugs. This was intended to keep individuals with any sort of connection to drugs "'off the streets' and behind bars" for extensive periods of time. These strict guidelines sent men and women away for decades. The war on drugs has targeted individuals beyond those using or addicted to drugs by also victimizing those who are "unwittingly, unknowingly, or peripherally" involved in drug-related activity. Together, the war on crime and war on drugs have produced contemporary mass incarceration in America,"distinguished by rate of imprisonment far above all other industrialized nations and involving the systematic confinement of entire groups of citizens."

Incarceration rate in the US by gender, 1925–2008

The war on drugs has had specific and devastating consequences for women, especially women in relationships with partners or relatives who use or sell drugs, as well as women who have no other choice but to become involved in the drug trade to support their families in the "absence of living wage jobs and in the face of cuts to public assistance." The number of women in prison and the time they spent inside grew significantly throughout the 1980s and 1990s. Between 1986 and 1999, the number of women incarcerated in state prisons for drug-related offenses increased by 888 percent. More so, it has also expanded the criminalization of people by race and gender. For example, there has been a distinct increase in the number of incarcerated African American and Latina women in the U.S., who make up a disproportionate number of women arrested, charged, convicted, and incarcerated for drug-related offenses. The incarceration rate for African American women for all crimes, driven by drug-related offenses, increased by 800 percent between 1986 and 2005, compared to a 400 percent increase for women of all races.

Even though the number of crimes committed by women has remained relatively constant, the rate of imprisonment has continued to increase. As of 2018 there are over 219,000 women in prisons and jails in the United States, and it is commonly believed that this is a factor of increased incarceration in response to drug offenses.

== Sexes of guards and staff ==
As of 2007, in most of the Western world, the guards in female prisons are exclusively female. Meanwhile, in same year, about 40% of prison guards in American women's prisons are men. In some facilities, most of the prison guards are men: Silja Talvi, author of Women Behind Bars: The Crisis of Women in the U.S. Prison System, argued that in theory gender equality makes sense in all occupations, but in practice having male guards watch over female prisoners is problematic. Until the passage of the Civil Rights Act of 1964 and the Equal Employment Opportunity Act of 1972, this was true in the United States. Men usually worked in perimeter posts, such as gate posts, rather than having direct contact with female prisoners. Male employees previously had restricted positions. Both acts integrated the workforce, and after the acts passed male employees gained increasingly direct contact with female prisoners.

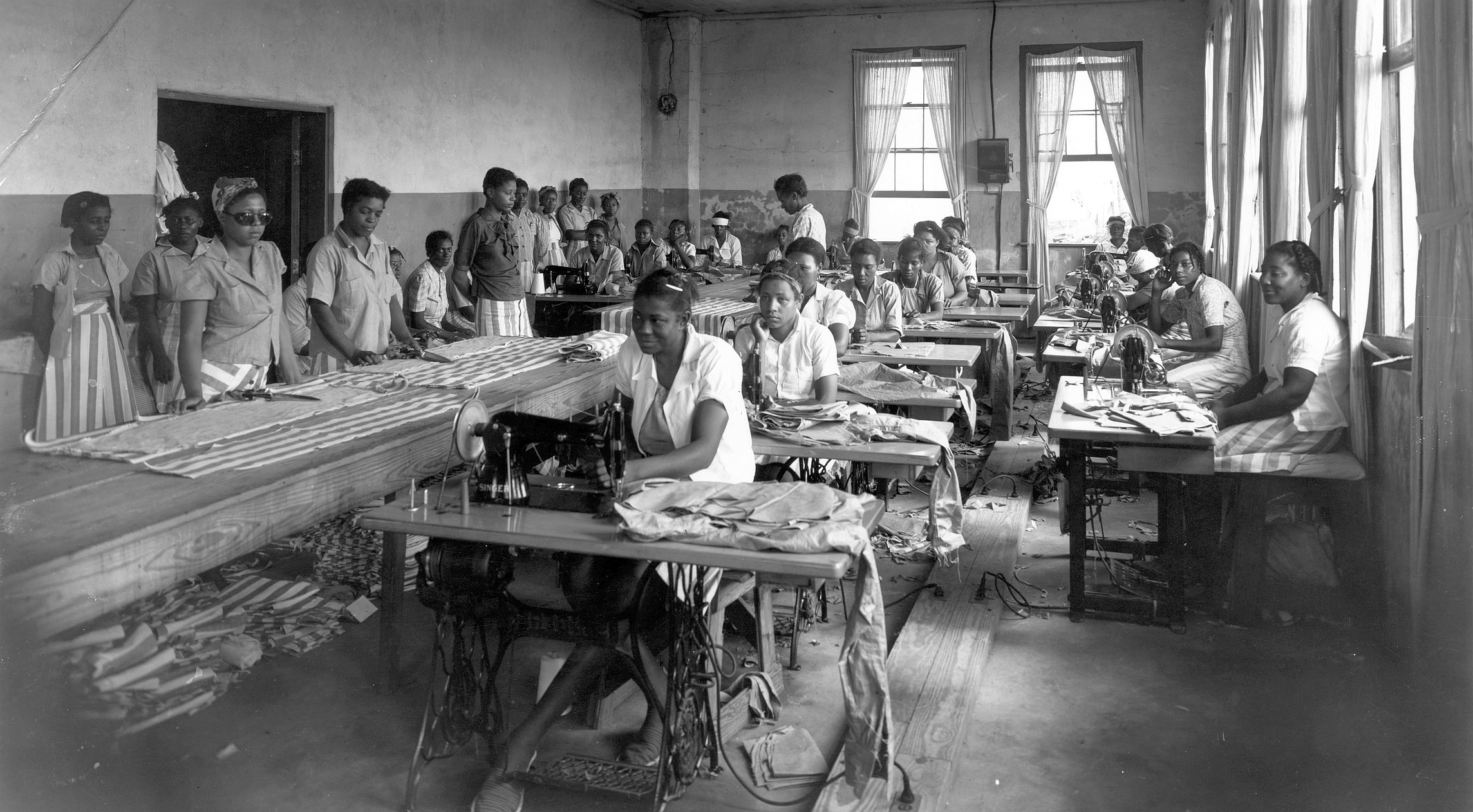
Female prisoners at Parchman sewing, c. 1930

== Social factors leading to incarceration ==
There are many socioeconomic factors that foster the cycle of mass incarceration. The exponential growth of female inmates reflects the "pervasive gender mandates" in America, as well as women's lower-ranking social and economic status. The overrepresentation of minorities and poor people in prison reflects the "deeply entrenched forces of institutional racism and class prejudice." Poor families living in "de-industrialized" urban areas, "devoid of their traditional communities of sustenance and healing" are more likely to be victims of "violent stigmas that predestine their incarceration." Notably, poverty, racism, domestic violence, and addiction intersect to create a "cycle of survival, criminalization, and repeated incarceration." In her book Interrupted Life, historian Rickie Solinger believes that four factors contribute to the prison crisis. First, the impacts of globalization and economic restructuring on low-income communities. Second, the war on drugs. Third, the role of illegal alien incursion from the south, fuel incarceration. Lastly, emergence of a prison–industrial complex, a relationship between corporate and governmental interests that has led to prison expansion in the U.S. Along with these items, women's poverty is criminalized in many ways. Due to feminization of poverty and lack of housing choices for women of color with children, the war on drugs affects minority women living in inner cities, forcing them to live in "high crime, drug-infested areas." In the face of declining incomes and few economic opportunities, women often have no choice but to turn to the street economy, sex work, petty theft, welfare "fraud," and other means of survival. For many women, personal or domestic violence and sexual abuse are a part of their incarceration. For poor women especially, experiences of violence, particularly in the household, may incite behavior that leads to arrest and criminal charges. Poverty is also criminalized when women with mental illness, most who have experienced post-traumatic symptoms from childhood and adult trauma, come into contact with the law, either through "antisocial or violent behavior or through self-medication with illegal drugs."

Women of color also feel pressured to fit into the 'norm' of what social life should be for women (i.e. be happily married, have a functional family, have a good job and a nice house). This often leads to their conforming and accepting abusive relationships or adapting to their partner's expectations. For example, women who suffer from substance abuse are mainly subjected to it by their partner. Studies showed that women, in fact, believe that engaging in such destructive activities would create a stronger emotional bond, as well as put a halt to the abuse they consistently endure. They assume that because their relationship is going downhill, it must be a failure on their part and decide to make a change, usually for the worse.

The systematic oppression faced by Black men in society also affects women's outcomes; they have to take on the role of the breadwinner and often, when not making enough, lead to taking alternatives such as involvement with drugs, theft, and prostitution. This may lead to their incarceration. The profile that surfaces of the black female offender is "that of a young, uneducated, single mother. She is likely to be unemployed, with few marketable skills, and is more likely to be on welfare". Female inmates were also described as "confined by social conditions in their communities, restrained by their families' circumstances, severely limited by abuse in their intimate relationships, and forced to make hard choices with very few options". They are characterized as "compelled to crime".

== Differences between incarcerated women and men ==
Men make up the majority of prisoners in the United States, approximately ten times as many as women in 2013, but the growth rate for women has been dramatically higher than the growth rate for men over the past few decades, a difference that is especially pronounced in state facilities. Women are disproportionately held in jails: the Prison Policy Initiative found that "about a quarter of convicted incarcerated women are held in jails, compared to about 10% of all people incarcerated with a conviction." Studies show that the way in which men and women cope while imprisoned differs in that women tend to form family structures in an effort to recreate the roles they would normally follow in society; however, men tend to isolate themselves from others and tend to be more aggressive towards the other inmates. Child care is also another issue that women must worry about when they are incarcerated. According to Mumola, 64% of women were primary guardians for their children prior to being incarcerated compared to men at only 44%. It is likely that men like women experienced traumatic events in their childhood, but research has shown that women experience a higher rate of trauma.

No country in the world incarcerates more women than the United States, as shown by Statista in a 2013 study.

Because many states have only one female facility, in comparison to having numerous men's facilities, women are forced to stay in that one specific facility. Women do not have the option of transferring to another facility like men do and they "experience additional deprivations" as they do not have the option to transfer in cases of problematic issues with other inmates or work staff or in cases of desiring to be closer to home. Women have fewer visits from their children, which is influenced by the fact that women facilities are limited and located mostly in rural areas far from women's hometowns. When men are in prison, their female partners may take the kids to visit him. However, due to the statistics on the many of women prisoners being the primary caregivers of children, usually another female family member will take care of her children.

Those who take care of the children with an incarcerated mother where the mother is the primary caregiver, the financial costs of raising that incarcerated mother's children limits the amount of resources people send to the mother in prison. Raising a child, specifically in this instance, someone else's child, is costly. As stated in the source "Surviving incarceration: Two prison-based peer programs build communities of support for female offenders," mothers in prison generally "worry about the welfare of their children, if their children are properly cared for, and if they will be able to maintain long-lasting bonds with their children in lieu of these barriers."

Incarcerated women also use prison libraries differently from the way male prisoners do. In general, women are less likely to use the law library to "seriously research their own cases." Some scholars believe this is because women's sentences are typically shorter and less severe than men's. Often, incarcerated women are seeking information about marital law and child custody and support in prison libraries.

=== Death row ===
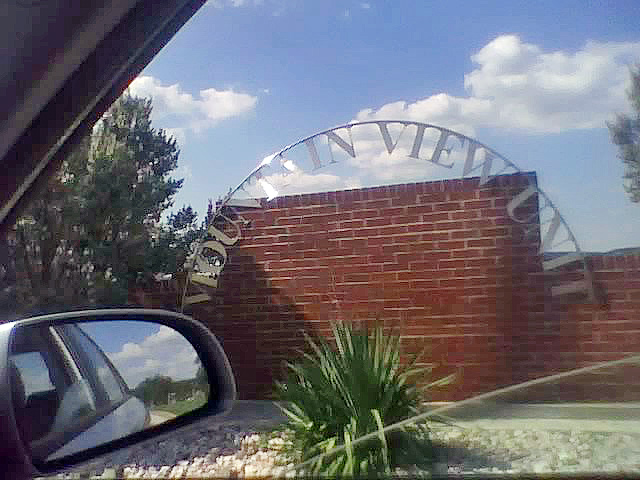
Mountain View Unit (now Patrick O'Daniel Unit), a state prison for women in Gatesville, Texas, houses the state death row for women.

The number of women on death row is significantly less than the number of men, women make up only 2% of death row inmates as of 2013. All the women on death row in the past two centuries committed murder, with the exception of Ethel Rosenberg, who was sentenced to death for espionage. Women on death row have a relatively low chance of actually being executed: there have only been 571 documented executions from 1632 to 2012. Currently, about half of the women on death row are in the top five states for death row sentencing (California, Florida, Texas, North Carolina and Ohio). Although California is the top state for death sentences, no woman has been executed since 1962.

== Mental health issues ==
Overall, incarcerated populations are more likely than the general population to have a mental illness. For many women, experiences with poverty, mental illness, substance abuse, and physical, emotional, or sexual abuse contribute to their entry to the criminal justice system. As of 2006, about 64% of women entering jail and 54% of women entering prison had one or more mental illnesses. Most people are aware of the disparities in mental health prevalence between incarcerated populations and the general population, but fewer are aware of the dramatic gender disparities in mental health issues between incarcerated men and women. Almost two times as many women in correctional facilities report suffering from a mental illness as men. And while one in seven men reported an experience with serious psychological distress, one in five women reported such an experience.

Having prior symptoms and diagnoses of mental illnesses can be amplified and worsened by a prison system that cannot afford to provide the proper support for inmates. There is widespread agreement that mental health services for incarcerated populations are inadequate, and in addition to failing to provide sufficient mental health treatment and services, prisons and jails are anti-therapeutic, where the experience of incarceration itself can worsen mental health problems or cause new ones.

=== Psychological trauma ===
Incarcerated populations have a disproportionately high proportion of people who have encountered some form of abuse in their lifetime. Many incarcerated women therefore suffer from prolonged physical, psychological, or social distress as a result of their past trauma. Many women in prison with histories of trauma and abuse exhibit symptoms of post-traumatic stress disorder and battered woman's syndrome, and are vulnerable to experiences of retraumatization in the prison setting. A study from 2016 found that 54% of women in the sample had a lifetime diagnosis of PTSD. Prison dynamics, especially with male guards, can simulate abusive power dynamics previously present in women's lives, and many prison policies and practices can worsen those dynamics, like internal physical searches, verbal or physical belittlement by guards, and invasions or complete lack of privacy in cells. Women are also always aware of the threat of sexual assault in the prison setting, which contributes to feelings of vulnerability and powerlessness that women with past trauma may already be experiencing. Incarcerated women suffer from past sexual trauma at a much higher rate than incarcerated men.

One 2009 study found that 70% of incarcerated women have experience severe physical violence by a parental figure, 59% have experienced some form of sexual abuse as a child, and more than 75% have experienced physical violence by an intimate partner in adulthood. And research has consistently demonstrated a strong connection between experiencing childhood abuse and having mental health disorders in adulthood.

=== Substance abuse ===
Women in prison suffer from a very high rate of substance abuse disorders. A 2006 study found that the rate of substance abuse disorders among incarcerated women in 71.6%, and higher among women with a history of childhood trauma. According to the Bureau of Justice Statistics publication Women Offenders (December 1999), in 1998 40% of women in US state prisons said they were using drugs at the time they committed the crimes they were convicted of, compared with 32% of men, and of the women in state prisons in 1998, one third committed their crimes to buy drugs.

== Sexual abuse in correctional facilities ==
Historically, sexual abuse within the prison and jail system has been prevalent as seen through years of sexual exploitation of incarcerated women by prison and jail administrators and guards. Dating back to the 1800s, Estelle Freedman sheds light on the prison brothel that was run by male staff members of an Indiana state prison. Sexual abuse can range from numerous different actions and behaviors, and some forms of sexual abuse are normalized through the manipulation of "routine prison practices" such as pat downs. Although sexual abuse and rape are seen in all combinations of genders, many reports show that male guards are more likely to instigate assaults against women inmates due to the fact that they can act almost freely, usually with impunity.

Sexual abuse and rape can happen to all demographic groups within the prison system, but those belonging the LGBT community or people with mental illness are more heavily targeted. A large prison found in the Southern part of the United States discovered through an intensive study that 68.4% experienced sexual assault prior to being incarcerated, and 17.2% experienced sexual assault in prison. Three percent of the people in this study had experienced a completed rape inside prison. Bureau of Justice Statistics figures show that women are at higher risk than men of inmate-on-inmate sexual victimization, and lower risk of staff sexual victimization:

Prevalence of sexual victimization, by type of incident and sex, National Inmate Survey, 2008–2009
	Prison inmates reporting sexual victimization (Note: Percent of inmates reporting one or more incidents of sexual victimization involving another inmate or facility staff in the past 12 months or since admission to the facility, if less than 12 months.)			Jail inmates reporting sexual victimization		
Sex	Number of inmates (Note: Estimated number of inmates at mid year 2008 in prisons and jails represented by NIS-2, excluding inmates under age 18. Estimates have been rounded to the nearest 100.)	Inmate-on-inmate	Staff sexual misconduct	Number of inmates	Inmate-on-inmate	Staff sexual misconduct
Male (Note: Comparison group.)	1,357,100	1.9%	2.9%	678,100	1.3%	2.1%
Female	100,600	4.7% (Note: Difference with comparison group is significant at the 95%-confidence level.)	2.1%	99,100	3.1%	1.5%

The same study shows that women are less likely than men to be forcibly abused, but more likely to be persuaded. In regard to inmate-on-inmate abuse in prison, males (16%) were more likely than females (6%) to have been victimized 11 or more times, to have been bribed or blackmailed (42% compared to 26%), offered protection (39% compared to 19%), or threatened with harm (48% compared to 30%). Males were more likely than females to report have multiple perpetrators (25% compared to 11%), and to have incidents initiated by a gang (20% compared to 4%). Broadly similar ratios applied to jails.

A study published in the Journal of Nervous & Mental Disease found that in the Correctional Institution for Women in Rhode Island, 48.2% of the inmates met criteria for current PTSD and 20.0% for lifetime PTSD. Research suggests that "women with histories of abuse are more likely to accept sexual misconduct from prison staff because they are already conditioned to respond to coercion and threats by acquiescing to protect themselves from further violence". "In federal women's correction facilities, 70% of guards are male."

Two prominent prison reforms for sexual abuse have come about in the last 20 or so years. In 1996, the Prison Litigation Reform Act, or PLRA, was passed in response to an increase in prisoner complaints and lawsuits. The PLRA was designed to make it more difficult for prisoners to file for litigation by providing a rigid guideline and checklist that must be met before being able to file a valid lawsuit. Inmates must exhaust all grievance remedies before qualifying for legal action against a prison or jail guard or staff member. The PLRA resulted in a negative sentiment in reporting cases of sexual abuse or assault because inmate would fear punishment and lash back on themselves, while having low expectations for adequate and appropriate responses to be made in reparation of their case. In 2003, President Bush signed the "Prison Rape Elimination Act into law, legally addressing prisoner rape, calling for a study of prison rape and developing guidelines for states on how to address the problem." The purpose of the act was to provide research and gather statistics for the rate of prison rape in all governmental levels of the prison system and it is supposed "to provide information, resources, recommendations and funding to protect individuals from prison rape". Although the primary focus was to combat all prisoner rape and sexual assault, the PREA does not successfully protect prisoners, especially those within minority groups like women and the LGBT community. Instead, PREA gives correctional officers and facility operators the ability to punish inmates for engaging in any sexual behavior, including consensual activity. As a result, punishment for all sexual acts "[discourages] prisoners from reporting sexual violence". In 2005, "the Office of the Inspector General and the DOJ released a report documenting widespread sexual abuse by prison employees nationwide, noting that only 37% had faced some kind of legal action. Of those, ¾ walked away with no more than probation. It took all of this evidence for the BOP to finally criminalize sexual contact as a felony in 2006, so that guards can actually face up to five years in prison". However, "when authorities confirmed that corrections staff had sexually abused inmates in their care, only 42% of those officers had their cases referred to prosecution; only 23% were arrested, and only 3% charged, indicted, or convicted. Fifteen per cent were actually allowed to keep their jobs".

Despite such legislative progress, women are fully dependent on the guards for basic necessities and privileges, and in many states, guards have access to inmates' personal history files which can empower them to threaten prisoners' children if the women retaliate. Female inmates who retaliate also face the loss of eligibility for early parole in addition to prolonged periods of disciplinary segregation, and detrimental write-ups, which further deters acts of resistance. Many times, sexual abuse cases go unreported so the extent of the issue is unclear. Although this is true, the PREA and new national standards for prison rape prevention, detection, and response is showing an increasing in the number of reported allegations of sexual victimization. Of the new cases reported in 2015, 58% of them were inmate-inmate cases, while 42% of them were staff-inmate cases. From 2013 to 2015, there were about "15,875 allegations of inmate-on-inmate sexual harassment", but only about 16% of the allegations were proven and found to be true based on investigations.

== Healthcare ==
The provision of healthcare to incarcerated women is a huge task which demands attention. Not only do female prisoners have special health needs to be met, but the correctional setting itself can present health risks to women, like the spread of communicable diseases, sexual violence, nutritional deficiencies, and the physical and psychological effects of poor and stressful living conditions.

Incarcerated women suffer disproportionately from many conditions, like HIV/AIDS, infectious diseases within prisons, reproductive issues, and chronic diseases. Many women in correctional facilities enter with histories of poverty, unemployment, drug abuse, and physical abuse or violence, which all contribute to high rates of trauma and physical and mental health issues. A large proportion of female inmates are women of color from low socioeconomic backgrounds and therefore suffer disproportionately from both chronic diseases that are common in minorities (such as diabetes, heart disease, and hypertension) and health problems that may result from living in poverty with prolonged lack of access to proper healthcare (such as malnutrition, etc.).

The structure of the US prison system does not adequately accommodate for these healthcare disparities and the specific needs of female prisoners. The health care needs of women have been largely neglected because correctional facilities were originally designed to meet only the needs of male inmates, and the justice system overall continues to reflect that structure as it has failed to account for the changing demographic of incarcerated people in the US.

Policies regarding health treatment at prison institutions often limit the availability of care. Due to the geographic isolation of prisons, typically in rural areas, and the comparatively low wages offered for working in them, there is a lack of qualified and experienced healthcare professionals willing to work in prisons, which in turn, reduces the quality of care offered. Overcrowding and poor working environments in facilities exacerbate the problem. Recent efforts to reduce spending costs have also contributed greatly to the barriers that incarcerated women face in obtaining adequate healthcare. For example, the practice of many prisons has become to require inmates to pay a co-payment for doctor's visits out of their own personal commissaries, and though these fees are set at relatively low costs, they can still be a huge deterrent to seeking care given the incredibly low wages women are paid for their labor in prison. 35 states use this co-payment system, and the money generated goes towards prison revenue. When co-payments cost between $20–$100, and women are paid as little as twelve cents per hour, this fee can be a huge financial strain. Consequently, women in prison are often forced to choose between accessing medical care and paying for basic products that are not provided to them for free like toothbrushes, soap, or tampons, and in some cases, many women thus choose to forego medical treatment even when they have serious health concerns.

The view of women's prisons, and prisons in general, as a profiting industry has also contributed to the inadequacy of healthcare in women's prisons. Since prisoners are the ones who complete the tasks necessary to keep prisons operating, many are forced to keep working on tasks which involve manual labor even if their health is not good. For example, in California women who are legally categorized as disabled outside of prison are forced to work in prison, as their disabled status is rejected. Many of the basic tools to keep good hygiene such as toothbrushes, shampoo, or soap are not given for free to women anymore, but are rather sold in the commissaries by private companies who paid the government the highest bid to win the contracts, and many women are unable to afford these basic products at such inflated prices, which results in poor sanitary and hygiene conditions inside prisons. A lack in funding also results in many prisons, in the provision of unhealthy meals for the prisoners, lacking in many key nutrients. Prison meals usually contain high levels of fat, sugar, and salts, and fresh fruit or vegetables are rarely provided, or provided in very small proportions, which negatively impacts the health of incarcerated women as they are not able to obtain a well-balanced diet.

One major issue with regards to studying women's healthcare in prison is the lack of availability of data. The combination of the United States's decentralized criminal legal system and the apathy towards the particular population of incarcerated women results in a huge gap in reporting of vital statistics on healthcare and health outcomes. Additionally, there are no mandatory standards, oversight, or requirements for data reporting on health services in US correctional facilities, demonstrated by the fact that there is no systematic report on pregnancy outcomes in American prisons, despite the clear need, just as one example.

=== Reproductive health ===
In 1994 the National Institute of Corrections said that American prison systems did not adequately provide gynecological services. During that year half of the state prison systems surveyed by the institute provided female-specific health care services, including mammograms and pap smears. Amnesty International said that, in the systems offering those services, many women encountered long waiting lists. The results of study conducted in a Rhode Island prison indicated high levels of reproductive health risks (STDs, unplanned pregnancies, etc.), from which researchers concluded that providing reproductive health services to incarcerated women would be beneficial to the women, the community, and the criminal justice system.

Within the American prison system, HIV became more prevalent among women than among men. According to the U.S. Department of Justice, from 1991 to 1998 the number of women prisoners with HIV increased by 69%, while the equivalent figure among male prisoners decreased by 22% during the same time period. The New York State Department of Health stated in 1999 that women entering New York state prisons had twice as high of an HIV rate as men entering New York state prisons. At the end of the year 2000 women in U.S. state prison systems had a 60% higher likelihood of carrying HIV than men in American state prison systems. According to HIV in Prison by the Bureau of Justice Statistics, in 2004 2.4% (1 in 42) of women in American prisons had HIV, while 1.7% (1 in 59) of men had HIV.

Additionally, 72% of women entering jail in New York have a medical problem, with 50% having issues regarding their reproductive organs after some time in jail. These women are constantly under-diagnosed, due to lack of sufficient healthcare services in prisons.

Though national medical organizations including the National Commission on Correctional Health Care, the American College of Obstetricians and Gynecologists, and the American Public Health Association have released standards of care for obstetric and gynecological services specifically for prisoners, there is no real requirement that facilities comply with those standards and no mechanism of enforcement or accountability.

==== Menstruation in US prisons ====
Menstruation, menstrual symptoms, and their accompanying health care and sanitation demands are unique to female populations, and often go overlooked in prison healthcare systems. Feminine hygiene in US prisons is marked by irregular availability, poor quality, and minimal protection, and poses serious health risks like bacterial infections, Toxic shock syndrome, and Sepsis to inmates who must improvise menstrual hygiene supplies or overuse the ones available to them. As of 2018, only 13 states and the City of New York have enacted legislation to provide free menstrual products in prisons, and in other cases when women have to purchase sanitary products through prison commissaries, it is often at rates they cannot afford on the minimal income they make for a day's work, which is usually under $1 per day. One 2018 study conducted by the Texas Criminal Justice Coalition on state facilities in Texas found that 54% of women don't have access to menstrual supplies when they need them. Not having access to adequate supplies ultimately causes unnecessary shame and humiliation for female inmates, as they are forced to consult male correctional officers for issues like bleeding through their uniforms or inadequate supply of pads and tampons.

Incarcerated women also have high rates of menstrual irregularity and menstrual disorders that often go untreated in prisons. Issues such as pre-menstrual tension and cramping, excessive or painful menstruation, and menstrual cessation account for a large proportion of health complaints in women's prisons. Menstrual irregularity is linked to certain stresses experienced both inside and outside of the prison setting itself, like violence, trauma, or poverty, and also from stress and anxiety disorders, which incarcerated women experience at significantly higher rates than the general population. One 2007 study published in Women's Health Issues found that incarcerated women experience some form of menstrual dysfunction at three times the rate of the general population, and at twice the rate of women of low socioeconomic status outside of prison.

=== Pregnancy and prenatal care in US prisons ===
In the United States, approximately 6% to 10% of women in correctional facilities are pregnant at any given time, and up 25% of women either arrive pregnant or had given birth within the last year. Demographically, the majority of incarcerated women are of reproductive age (74.7%), and 80% of incarcerated women report having been sexually active in the three months prior to their incarcerations with the majority not using any reliable form of contraception. Though it is difficult to obtain data on the rates of pregnancy in correctional facilities due to a lack of reporting standards, it is estimated that about 2000 women give birth while incarcerated in the United States every year. Estimates of the percentage of women who are pregnant at the time of incarceration range from 4% to 10%, which, given the total number of women incarcerated and that figure's growing rate, is quite significant. The population of pregnant incarcerated women is frequently neglected and marginalized, as the US Justice System has not yet adapted to the increasing number of women in the system, and data on the prevalence, outcomes, and quality of care for pregnancies in US prisons are incredibly difficult to obtain.

==== Current treatment of pregnant inmates ====
Many current practices in caring for pregnant women in US correctional facilities conflict with standards of obstetric care as outlined by the American College of Obstetricians and Gynecologists, and are often considered unethical or inhumane by human rights and health organizations such as Amnesty International, the American Civil Liberties Union, and the World Health Organization. Fewer than half of US prisons have official policies about medical care for pregnant inmates, and according to the Bureau of Justice Statistics, only 54% of pregnant incarcerated women received some type of pregnancy care, and among those that did receive care, the quality of services from institution to institution varies greatly. Many women also enter correctional facilities with prior un-met health problems, such as poor nutrition, substance abuse issues, or untreated sexually transmitted infections, which can all negatively impact a woman's pregnancy if not properly addressed through adequate health care. Overall, most prisons are not sufficiently prepared to accommodate the complicated logistical, medical, and emotional challenges associated with incarcerating pregnant women.

Women who are in jail or prison often have very high-risk pregnancies due to a higher prevalence of risk factors, which can negatively influence both pregnancy and delivery. Among these are the mother's own medical history and exposure to sexually transmitted infections, her level of education, mental health, substance use/abuse patterns, poor nutrition, inadequate prenatal care, socio-economic status, and environmental factors, such as violence and toxins. These high-risk pregnancies and underlying medical conditions are more prevalent among incarcerated women because they are more likely to come from low socioeconomic backgrounds with a lack of access to health care. Addressing complications during pregnancy and emergent deliveries present some of the most pressing physical dangers associated with pregnancy in prison.

==== Prenatal care ====
Prenatal care in prisons is erratic. The Federal Bureau of Prisons, the National Commission on Correctional Health Care, the American Public Health Association, the American Congress of Obstetricians and Gynecologists, and the American Bar Association have all outlined minimal standards for pregnancy-related health care in correctional settings, and 34 states have established policies for provision of adequate prenatal care. However, these guidelines are not mandatory and the services can vary widely, and there is not a reliable reporting measure to ensure services are delivered, as 49 states do not require any sort of reporting on pregnancies in correctional settings or their outcomes.

Prenatal care for incarcerated women is a shared responsibility between medical staff in the prison and community providers, but specific delineation of care is determined locally, depending on available resources and expertise. The availability of particular prenatal OB/GYN services and the quality of those services varies widely. Even when inmates are able to obtain care at appropriate intervals during their pregnancies, there is evidence that correctional medical personnel have incentives to downplay women's concerns and avoid the prescription of medication to both save the facility money and also avoid extra work and complicated logistics associated with treatment.

Additionally, pregnant inmates often have difficulty obtaining proper prenatal nutrition to support a healthy pregnancy. Although many state facilities have a registered dietician on staff to oversee the nutritional value of prison meals, there are no federal regulations mandating the nutritional intake of inmates and pregnant inmates. Since providing foods high in nutritional content or vitamin supplements can be a costly undertaking, many prisons fall short in this area and do not consider it a top priority. However, not receiving a sufficient daily intake of key nutrients can be especially harmful for pregnant incarcerated women and the development of the fetus. A 2012 study focusing on the health care of pregnant women in the U.S. found that the majority of the 19 prisons surveyed reported very limited access to fruits and vegetables. A lack of fresh fruits and vegetables can make receiving the recommended daily intake of vitamin C difficult. Furthermore, vitamin C is required for the absorption of iron into the body - a key nutrient that facilitates the prevention of preterm labor and low infant birth weight.

==== Shackles ====
Shackles are typically used for inmates who demonstrate risk of elopement, harm to self, or harm to others. Historically, they have also been used with women attending prenatal care appointments, as well as during labor and delivery. When used during transit, the use of shackles on the ankles and wrists puts a mother at risk of falling, in which case she would be unable to reach out to soften the fall. In turn, this could put both the mother and the fetus at risk of injury. Shackles can also interfere with labor and delivery, prohibiting positions and range of motion for the mother, doctors, and nurses. Following delivery, shackles interfere with a mother's ability to hold and nurse her infant child. In addition, women feel ashamed and discriminated against when they are shackled in a community hospital. Though the Eighth Circuit ruled the shackling of pregnant women unconstitutional in 2009, the majority of states continue to permit the practice due to a lack of enforcement measures and accreditation requirements for correctional facilities.

=== Abortion while incarcerated ===
Women have undergone forced sterilization which prohibits them from having children later in life. Other women in prison have not been given the option of having an abortion, although they may desire one. Even though there are women who can afford to pay for their own abortion, they still may not be allowed to have one because of being incarcerated. In some cases abortions may be allowed but some women may not be able to afford it, therefore ending the option of choice, as the government will not pay. These situations force women to have unwanted children and then they must find someone to keep their child until they are no longer incarcerated. The availability of abortion to incarcerated women varies widely depending on the location of the correctional facility.

==== Prison policies ====
Provide access to abortions	Funds therapeutic or medically necessary abortions	Funds abortions only to save life	Abortion counseling policy only	States with no official written policy
California	District of Columbia	Alabama	Idaho	Alabama
Connecticut	Massachusetts	Arkansas	Ohio	Alaska
Georgia	Minnesota	Colorado		Florida
Hawaii	Nevada	Delaware		Indiana
New Jersey	New Mexico	Florida		Kentucky
New York	Tennessee	Illinois		Michigan
Oregon	West Virginia	Iowa		Mississippi
Vermont		Kentucky		Missouri
Washington		Michigan		Montana
		Mississippi		Nebraska
		Missouri		New Hampshire
		Nebraska		North Carolina
		New Hampshire		North Dakota
		Oklahoma		Pennsylvania
		Rhode Island		South Dakota
		South Carolina		Wyoming
		Texas		
		Utah		
		Wisconsin		

==== State restrictions ====
Bans on medical funding	Bans on public facilities	Mandatory waiting periods	In person counseling requirements
Alabama	Arizona	Alabama	Indiana
Arkansas	Iowa	Arkansas	Louisiana
Colorado	Kansas	Idaho	Mississippi
Delaware	Kentucky	Indiana	Utah
District of Columbia	Louisiana	Kansas	Wisconsin
Florida	Missouri	Kentucky	
Georgia	North Dakota	Louisiana	
Idaho	Pennsylvania	Michigan	
Indiana		Minnesota	
Iowa		Mississippi	
Kansas		Nebraska	
Kentucky		North Dakota	
Louisiana		Ohio	
Maryland		Pennsylvania	
Maine		South Dakota	
Michigan		Utah	
Mississippi		Virginia	
Missouri		West Virginia	
Nebraska		Wisconsin	
Nevada			
New Hampshire			
North Carolina			
North Dakota			
Ohio			
Oklahoma			
Pennsylvania			
Rhode Island			
South Carolina			
South Dakota			
Tennessee			
Texas			
Utah			
Virginia			
Wisconsin			
Wyoming			

=== Labor and delivery in US prisons ===
Incarcerated women face many challenges when they have to give birth in correctional facilities. The issue of shackling pregnant women and women in labor has recently come into the public spotlight, yet there are many other issues that receive far less attention. A woman in labor may struggle to convince correctional officers that she is even in labor. One 2015 study found "an astounding number of reported incidents in which correctional officials refused to accept that a pregnant woman was in labor." And since a woman can only be transported to a hospital for delivery if a correctional official orders the transport, this issue in failing to establish labor can cause significant delays in transport, which subsequently delays the woman's pain management, or in the worst cases, can cause delivery to occur in a prison cell without adequate medical care, hygiene, and pain medication for the laboring woman.

Giving birth in prison also presents issues relating to bodily autonomy and control. While women outside of the prison context makes dozens of decisions about their pregnancies and deliveries, such as what type and how much pain relief medication to take, the method and timing of delivery, and who is present in the delivery room, an incarcerated woman is not able to make many of those decisions. Incarcerated women are not given adequate information to make informed decisions about their deliveries and treatment. Instead, correctional personnel and medical staff make decisions regarding a laboring inmate's ability to access pain medication, and correctional facilities routinely schedule deliveries via cesarean section for women who have not requested them and do not require them due to medical complications. Incarcerated women also have very little or no say about who is present in the delivery room, and policies about whether or not they have access to a birthing attendant are arbitrary and inconsistent.

=== Care after childbirth ===
The structure of US justice systems makes development of maternal attachment nearly impossible. After the births of their children, many women are returned to the jail or prison, and their infant immediately enters foster or kinship care. However, within many state policies, relatives are given less financial support, which can leave foster care to be more viable than kinship placement. "For 50% of all incarcerated mothers, this separation becomes a lifelong sentence of permanent separation between mothers and their children."

Some prisons have nurseries for the mother and child. Women are only eligible to participate in a prison nursery if they are convicted of non-violent crimes and do not have a history of child abuse or neglect. Prison nurseries vary widely, but they provide an opportunity to breastfeed during a sensitive stage in development. They also provide time for a maternal attachment to be formed. Rates of recidivism are less for women who participated in prison nursery programs.

An improvement from the alternative, prison nurseries still leave many gaps in care. "Reports from mothers with children in prison nurseries indicate that their babies' close proximity allows prison staff to coerce and manipulate a mother by threatening to deny her access to her baby". Some advocacy groups argue for alternative sentencing, such as family-based treatment centers, where mothers convicted of non-violent crimes can learn parenting skills while receiving services and support to foster positive child development and build a foundation to re-enter society following her term with decreased risk for future incarceration. The data difficulties associated with studying pregnancy outcomes in prisons are the same, if not worse, for studying infants born to incarcerated mothers. There is incredibly little data on the babies born to incarcerated women and the immediate course of their care after birth.

=== Care of older women in prison ===
The rise in the population of incarcerated women in recent decades has led to an unprecedented number of older women in US correctional facilities. According to the Bureau of Justice, there are more than 11,000 women over the age of 50 currently in the US prison system, with 30,000 more women in their 40s soon to become included in that figure. This population of older women in prisons face the same aging-related health and accessibility concerns as aging women in the general population, such as mobility limitations, sensory decline, and cognitive disorders. However, aging in prison is made worse by the fact that many incarcerated women have underlying or chronic health issues that were not addressed prior to their imprisonment, and many "symptoms" of aging are also accelerated or subject to early onset due to the physical and mental effects of incarceration itself. Similarly, the overall poorer health of women in prison than in the general population gets magnified in elderly women due to a lack of access to specialized care or services, including education about health changes or resources for self-management of health. The Human Rights Watch found in 2012 that on average, the annual cost of detaining an elderly person is $70,000. As a result, many states have implemented cost-saving policies and practices which result in a lack of care and a denial of treatment for elderly women.

One 2014 study of 327 older women in seven different prisons in the southern United States found that as a baseline of their health conditions and needs, older incarcerated women have, on average, 4.2 chronic health problems, and very high rates of mental illness, for example with 46% of the women in the study experiencing high or serious levels of depression. The most common chronic illness among the group were arthritis, hepatitis, hypertension, and heart conditions, as well as health issues related to menopause. Many women in the study also expressed concern over significant, abnormal weight gain due to the lack of control over their diet and unhealthy nature of prison foods.

As a result of the neglect that older women in prison experience, they experience particular challenges in reintegrating into their communities following release from prison, for example in seeking housing or employment. "Intersecting hardships" such as age-related discrimination, sex-based discrimination, and the discrimination faced by any previously incarcerated individual can make it incredibly difficult for women to lead healthy lives once released. Furthermore, mental and physical health issues that go unaddressed in prison are linked to women's continuing involvement in the system, as women with health issues turn to unhealthy, potentially harmful social or self-medicating outlets to address pain.

=== Legal and policy considerations ===
==== Constitutional standards of medical care for prisoners ====
In the landmark Supreme Court case, Estelle v. Gamble (1976), the Court ruled that the government is required, under the Eighth Amendment's "cruel and unusual punishment" clause, to provide medical services for prisoners. Though the Amendment was originally intended to ban torture and other "barbarous" forms of punishment, the Court broadened its scope in this case to include the complete denial of, or wholly inadequate provision of, medical care for prisoners. However, the Court put a high bar on proving a constitutional violation in cases involving prison healthcare, making it difficult for prisoners to win their cases and for advocates to make significant changes. The requirement to prove a constitutional violation is that care must be withheld with "deliberate indifference," meaning that an "official knows of and disregards an excessive risk to inmate health or safety" and that "the official must both be aware of the facts from which the inference could be drawn that a substantial risk of serious harm exists, and he must also draw the inference." Proving this "deliberate indifference" piece is necessary for correctional officials to be held liable.

The Estelle case radically changed the legal avenues for advocating for better prison healthcare. Now, medical care is the most common issue involved in litigation on prisons. Various cases in the area of women's healthcare in prison have made strides in strengthening the legal grounds for better care, such as Newsome v. Lee County (2006), Herrera v. Valentine (1981), and Goode v. Correctional Medical Services (2001). Class action lawsuits pursued through Section 1983 have also been an important avenue for people seeking justice and improvements to the quality of health services in prisons.

==== Constitutional rights of pregnant inmates ====
There have been significant strides in maintaining and protecting the constitutional rights of pregnant inmates. For example, the US Court of Appeals for the Eighth Circuit in the case of Nelson v. Correctional Medical Services ruled in 2009 that shackling pregnant women to the bed during labor and delivery is unconstitutional. This decision was rendered after twenty-nine-year-old Nelson was taken to a local hospital in 2003 and had her legs shackled to opposite sides of the bed. She was shackled to the bed for several hours while in labor before she was taken to the hospital room. Nelson claimed the shackles caused her intense pain, discomfort, and severe cramps. She also was unable to change positions while in labor, which caused further discomfort. Although she remained the shackles were removed while she was delivering her child, they were immediately put back on post-delivery. Nelson also claimed that after delivering her child, she soiled the bed sheet because she could not get to the bathroom on time due to the shackles. The Eighth circuit contended that shackling women to the bed during labor and delivery violated the Eighth Amendment since shackling during labor and delivery is cruel punishment. This judicial decision also deemed that the officer in charge of presiding over Nelson during her labor and delivery deliberately acted indifferently. As a result, the court ruled that showing indifference during a woman's labor and delivery or inflicting unnecessary pain or discomfort also violates the Eighth Amendment.

Another important landmark case was Boswell v. Sherburne County. Wanda Boswell, who was six months pregnant and denied medical attention for abnormal bleeding, brought an action pursuant to 42 U.S.C. alleging that the prison staff neglected her medical needs. She claimed her constitutional rights under the Eighth and Fourteenth Amendment were violated. The court found that both of the correctional officials knew Boswell was bleeding and had severe cramps, yet failed to take action to reach out to medical professionals. Boswell's "clearly established right to medical care" was evidently violated. The court found Lero and Riecken responsible for this negligence. Under the Eighth Amendment, prisons are required to provide adequate medical care.

=== Privatization of prison healthcare ===
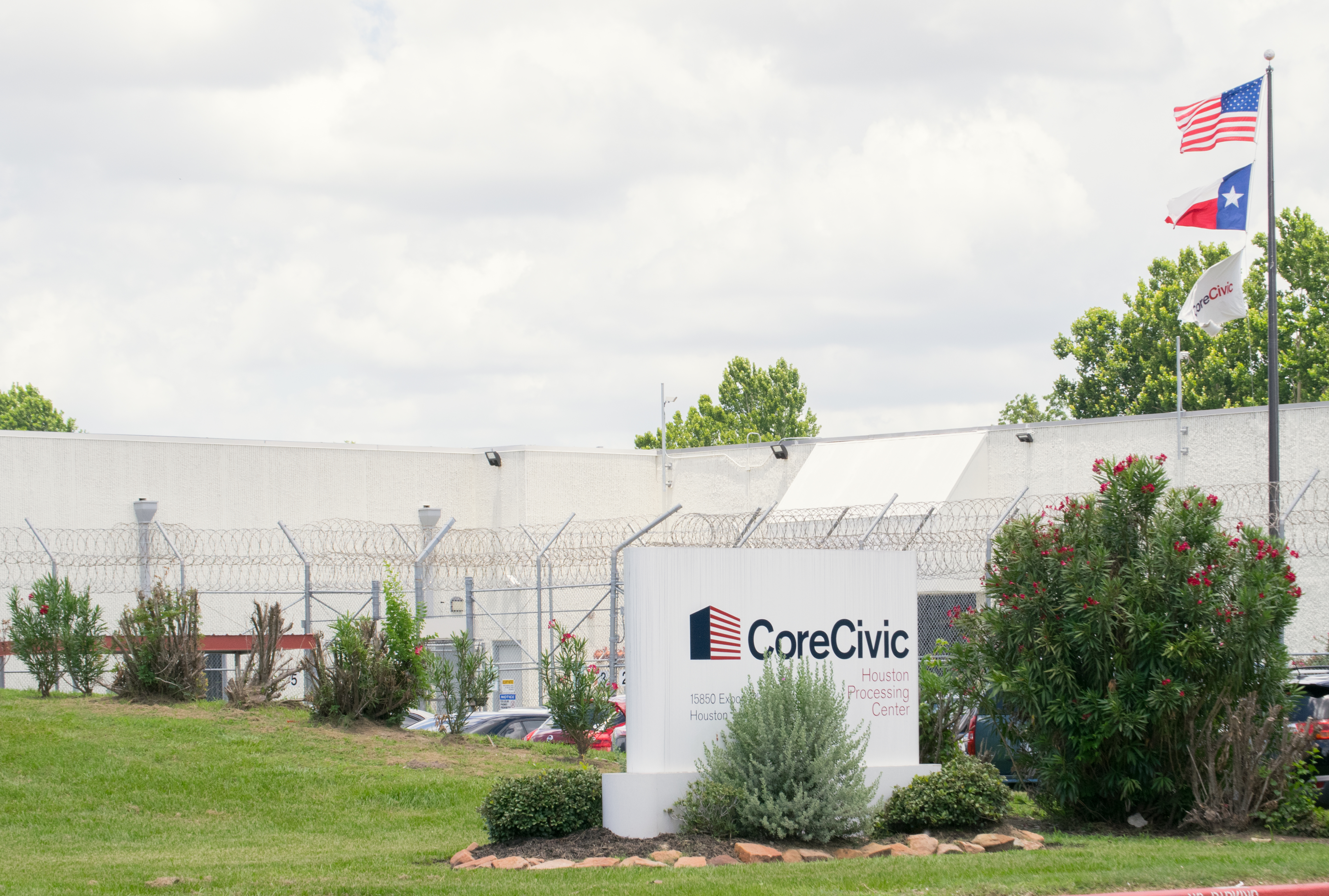
A CoreCivic Facility in Houston, Texas

Many federal and state prisons have turned to private companies to run prison health operations as a cost-saving measure. As of 2012, over 20 states have installed private health groups to run their medical services, with the largest providers being Corizon Health and Wexford Health Services. Both of these groups have been scrutinized for inhumane treatment of inmates. Private prison health groups also operate in private prisons themselves in addition to their functioning in state-run facilities which have outsourced. The two largest health groups that run services in private prisons are CoreCivic and GEO Group. Unlike strictly government-run facilities, private corporations are incentivized to maximize their profit margins to please shareholders, so they often choose revenue over national standards for health care by spending as little as possible on their services. For example, CoreCivic has a documented history of denying hospital stays to patients as they are costly to the operator, and also of punishing inmates for making multiple medical requests. Yet, companies argue that in reducing costs they are both providing adequate care for prisoners and also saving taxpayers money. These violations of standards are worsened by the fact that the records of private prisons are not subject to public access laws, so monitoring and regulating their health care activities is not possible.

Most people agree that contracting to private groups to operate prison health systems negatively impacts the health of inmates. One 2008 study at the University of California, Santa Barbara found that inmate mortality rates are significantly higher under private groups, and that contracting out reduces both health care costs and quality.

== Effects on motherhood and family structure ==
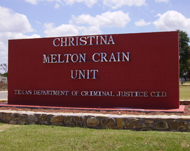
Christina Crain Unit, a state prison for women in Gatesville, Texas

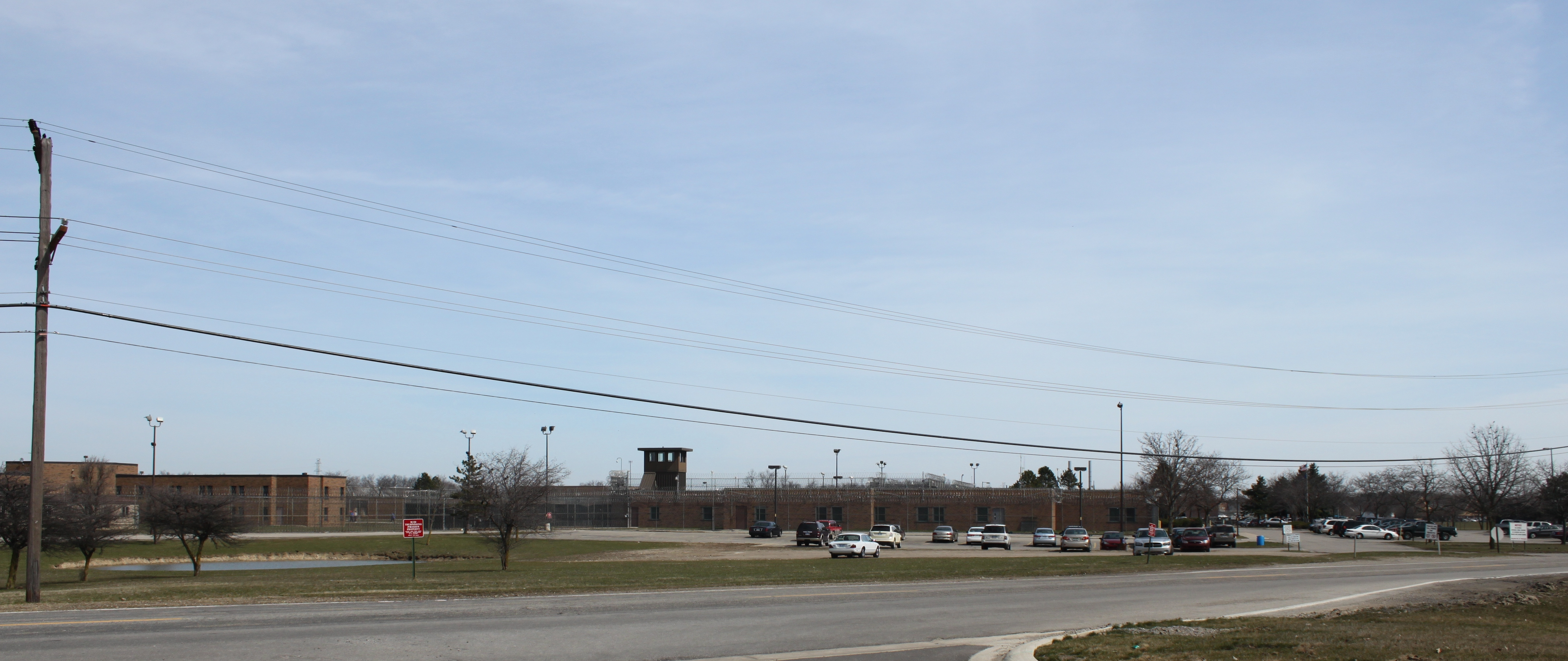
Women's Huron Valley Correctional Facility in Pittsfield Township, Michigan

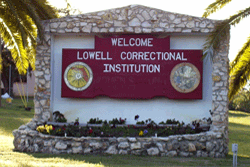
Lowell Correctional Institution in unincorporated Marion County, Florida

Prison can have an effect on relationships between prisoners and their children. As a general rule, except for with an experimental trial, a couple cannot enter the same prison. However, prisons have a problem with child care. 2.4 million American children have a parent behind bars today. Seven million, or 1 in 10 children, have a parent under criminal justice supervision—in jail or prison, on probation, or on parole. Many of the women incarcerated are single mothers who are subsequently characterized as inadequate, incompetent, and unable to provide for their children during and after imprisonment. However, "separation from and concern about the well-being of their children are among the most damaging aspects of prison for women, and the problem is exacerbated by a lack of contact".

According to the Bureau of Justice Statistics, "54% of mothers in state prisons as of 2000 had had no personal visits with their children since their admission". Obstacles that inhibit contact between mothers and their children include geographical distance, lack of transportation, lack of privacy, inability to cover travel expenses, and the inappropriate environments of correctional facilities. Mothers in prison typically are unable to fulfill the role of mother due to the separation. Incarcerated mothers are restricted in their decision-making power and their ability to create a sense of home and family within the institution is limited. Most children experience multiple risks across contextual levels for there is great importance in family environments. Children of incarcerated mothers are consistent with their high risk status and it can cause their intellectual outcomes to be compromised. Statistics indicate "that a majority of parents in state and federal prisons are held over 100 miles from their prior residence; in federal prison 43% of parents are held 500 miles away from their last home, and over half of female prisoners have never had a visit from their children and very few mothers speak with their children by phone while incarcerated".

Recent legislation has further impeded an incarcerated mother's ability to sustain custody of her children. The Adoption and Safe Families Act, enacted in 1997, "authorizes the termination of parental rights once a child has been in foster care for 15 or more months of a 22-month period. Incarcerated women serve an average of 18 months in prison. Therefore, the average female prisoner whose children are placed in foster care could lose the right to reunite with her children upon release". These stipulations expedite the termination of parental rights due to the narrow time frame. A 2003 study found that "termination proceedings involving incarcerated parents increased from approximately 260 in 1997, the year of ASFA's enactment, to 909 in 2002".

By examining post-incarcerated mothers, it is statistically and clinically proven that there is a positive effect of a healthy mother-child relationship and depression symptoms. There is also a positive effect of healthy peer and partner relationships on raising self-esteem for mothers who were previously incarcerated. This suggests that healthy relationships are essential to recovery from trauma and emotional well-being.

According to a 2000 report by the Bureau of Justice Statistics, "1/3 of incarcerated mothers lived alone with their children and over 2/3 of women prisoners have children under the age of 18; among them only 28% said that their children were living with the father while 90% of male prisoners with minor children said their children were living with their mothers."

The incarceration of parents affect family structures. Mothers in prison were more likely to report that they were the primary caregivers of their children. Maternal imprisonment affects children more harshly than the incarceration of their fathers. When the paternal figure of a home is convicted, children are affected, but they don't experience the same kind of attachment disparity as they do with their mothers. "When fathers go to prison, their children are more likely to remain in the care of their mothers; however, when mothers go to prison, not only are children separated from their mother but they more often transition to the care of a grandparent, or other family member, than to the care of their other parent ". In the case that there is no family member able to take the children in, they are taken into non-familial care. Children who grow up without their parents tend to have a higher chance of engaging in "substance abuse and addiction, mental illness, and abusive familial relationships".

There are limited employment opportunities after incarceration. Reduced opportunities for parents means reduced opportunities for their children who cannot access those resources denied to their parents, such as food stamps or employment. In addition, for communities where the majority of the population are targets for incarceration and where there are high incarceration rates, those economies are affected. In addition to poor economies, limited employment opportunities, and high incarceration rates in those communities, there is the creation of a "criminogenic environment" which affects the children growing up in those areas.

Women in the US criminal justice system are marginalized by race and class. Single mothers with low income go into the "underground economies" because of their inability to find a job that is stable and provides a good earning. Many mothers end up trapped in drugs, prostitution and theft. In many cases, incarcerated women who committed acts of violence are for self-defense against their abusive partners.

Bureau of Justice reported that about 200,000 children under 18 had incarcerated mothers and that 1.5 million children had a parent behind bars. Children face disruption and deleterious where they feel separated from the world such as their friends, school and community.(1) It can bring integration into their new world without their mother. 6.7 percent of African American children have incarcerated parents, a rate that is seven-and-a-half times greater than that of white children. Hispanic children experience parental incarceration at nearly three times the rate that white children do (Glaze and MAruchak 2008) Children feel the mother absences and experience disruption more than the absences of their incarcerated father. "64.2 percent of mothers in prison report they were living with their children before they went to prison, only 46.5 percent of incarcerated fathers did so." "Men are more likely to rely on their children's mothers to care for the children during their incarceration than women can on the children father. 88 percent of fathers in prison report that their children are being cared for by their child's mother while only 37 percent of inmate mothers say their child is being cared for by the child's father" (PG.4 Disrupted childhoods: Children of women in prison.) Children in most cases stay with relatives such as grandparents and 10 percent in foster care, group homes or social service agencies. The Children often feel stigma for having a parent in prison where they may feel the need to keep it a secret where they are not able to adjust. Most of the time these children are at risk of following their parents footsteps where they might become criminals by learning the behavior such as antisocial and criminal behavior. Caregivers and teachers see the child of inmates fighting more and becoming aggressive leading them to have a higher risk of conviction.

Most prisons do not have public transport, restrictive policies governing visits and phone calls. Prisons have policies such as the removal of infants born to women in prison, speedy termination of child custody for incarcerated women, restrictive welfare policies that make it difficult for families to be reunited, and women repeated periods in custody. Activists are trying to make a change and pass reforms that are going to help children and mothers deal with these consequences that are affecting them. One guideline that would help is a family connections policy framework to support and strengthen the relationship between incarcerated women and their children. If women are able to see their children, it gives them motivation to try to get their lives back on track.

There is 6.7 percent of African American children whose parents are incarcerated, a rate that is seven and half times greater than that for white children, and Hispanic children experience parental incarceration at nearly three times the rate that white children do. Children feel the mother absences and experience disruption than their father. "Men are more likely to rely on their children mothers to care for the children during their incarceration than women can on the children father. 88 percent of father in prison report that their children are being cared for by their child mother while only 37 percent of inmate mothers say their child is being cared for by the child's father". Children in most cases stay with relatives such as grandparents and 10 percent in foster care, group home or social service agency. Children often feel stigma for having a parent in prison where they may feel the need to keep it a secret where they are not able to adjust. Most of the time these children are at risk to follow in the footsteps of their parents where they might become criminals by learning the behavior. Caregivers and teachers see the children of criminals fighting more and becoming aggressive leading them to have a higher risk of conviction.

Prisons prevent contact between the mothers and their children in many ways. The locations of the prisons might not have a public transport, restrictive policies governing visits and phone calls, the removal of infants born to women in prison, speedy termination of child custody for incarcerated women, restrictive welfare policies that make it difficult for families to be reunited, and women repeated periods in custody. Some activist are trying to make a change and pass reforms that are going to help children and mothers to not deal with this consequences that are effecting them. One guideline that would help is a family connections policy framework to support and strengthen the relationship between incarcerated women and their children. If women are able to see their children, it gives them motivation to try to get their lives back on track.

== Demographics of incarcerated parents and their children ==
The most common age range for incarcerated parents is from age 25 to 35, followed by age 35 to 44 and age 24 and younger. In mid-2007, 809,800 prisoners in the US prison system were parents to children 18 years of age or younger. Of those prisoners, 744,200 were fathers and 65,600 were mothers. In comparison to 1991, this data shows the number of women in prison has more than doubled and the number of fathers incarcerated has increased by seventy-seven percent. According to studies by the Bureau of Justice Statistics, 1,706,600 children had at least one incarcerated parent in 2007.

=== Children of incarcerated parents ===
The most common age range for children with at least one incarcerated parent is from 0–9 years old, followed by children from 10 to 17 years old. In terms of racial demographics of children with incarcerated parents, Latino children are three times more likely to have a parent in prison in comparison to white children. Black children are about eight times more likely to have a parent in prison in comparison to white children. Nearly half of the children with an incarcerated father are Black children. This is data that has been published in scholarly and peer-reviewed articles, but as the article "Children of Color and Parental Incarceration: Implications for Research, Theory, and Practice" states, "these data among racial minorities must be carefully interpreted because higher numbers may be a reflection of larger societal issues (such as relative degree of involvement in crime, disparate law enforcement practices, sentencing parole policies and practices and biased decision making... rather than a problem among certain groups."

== Education in prison ==
Women have benefitted from educational opportunities for many years. Studies have found that there is a link between education levels and recidivism rates for women in prison. Inmates who have a high school degree or higher are found to be less likely to be back in prison while those who did not have a high school diploma were found to have a higher recidivism rate. Education programs for inmates has led to fewer disciplinary incidents while adults have been incarcerated. Often for many female prisoners, prison is the first chance for them to receive basic education. Education helps solve the problem of unemployment that many women face after they are released from prison. It ends up being more cost effective in the long run to allow prisoners education opportunities. People are now realizing that in a lot of ways education is more cost effective than incarceration itself. Even though there are benefits to having education programs in prison, few people actually qualify for these programs. Some of the people that do qualify chose not to participate in these programs. Inmates may not be able to complete the education programs due to being relocated to a different prison or because their sentence has been ended. Many education programs do not address the needs that women have based on their gender. Education programs can help women get connected to their community. There used to be programs that helped prisoners get money for education. One of these programs was the Pell Grant programme which helped inmates with financial aid to pay for college, but this was discontinued in 1994. As of July of 2023, the Pell Grant programme has been reinstated so that inmates in prison can have access to education during their incarceration.

== Barriers to reentering society ==
Of women in US state prisons, 44% do not have a high school diploma or equivalent (GED). As they reenter their communities, former inmates confront sparse job opportunities, limited options for stable and affordable housing, denials of public assistance, as well as the challenge of re-establishing relationships with family and friends. However, relationships, in particular among family, provide an extremely beneficial support system for prisoners returning home upon their release. Difficulties with employment, housing, and ostracism can decrease successful transitions and lead to a cycle in and out of prison.

Some concerns that are faced by policy-makers and correction officials about women re-entering into the community after prison are motherhood and the struggle with substance abuse and mental health issues.

Scholars have found that women face negative perceptions such as being seen as inadequate and unable to provide a stable, loving home for their children when they are transitioning back from prison into motherhood. This separation of children from their mothers is harmful to both the child and mother and this is the main reason for stress inside of women prisons. For many women getting out of prison, the only aspect of life they consider to be motivating and hopeful is resuming motherhood and connecting with their children again. Without their children, many see no reason to stay away from drugs or prostitution. Women in these circumstances are understood to have a better life if they are offered proper nutritional and medical care so they could lead a more stable lifestyle.

The struggle of addiction whether it be alcohol or drug abuse along with mental health issues are considered the three major factors that influence the success of women's transition back into the community. Women tend to take out their anger on themselves and in a self-mutilating or abusive way. Mood disorders, such as depression or anxiety, are seen to be more common among women than men. A study from 1990 found that 19 percent of women who suffer from depression, 31 percent of women who suffer from phobic disorders, and 7 percent of women that suffer from panic disorder also struggled with alcohol abuse. Women who have been released from prison face the struggle against addiction and could end up losing their children because of it.

For women to successfully transition back into society, they must begin this preparation process at the beginning of their sentence. Although this is recommended, inmates tend to not have any preparation before being placed back into the community. All of the released women have tasks they must complete to re-establish a place in society and to stay out of trouble. These are things such as, follow parole regulations, provide health care for themselves and/or their families, become financially stable, obtain employment, and find a safe place to live, all while possibly battling addiction. Without support from the community, women under these circumstances tend to fall back into drugs or criminal activity.

== Advocacy organizations ==
There are programs that have been established to help women after they are released from prison.

System organizations that are used to help women's reentry into the community consist of mental health, alcohol and drug programs, programs to help survivors and sexual violence, family services, food shelters, financial help programs, employment services, child care services, and community service clubs.

A continuity-of-care approach is taken when forming these programs for women. This is the providing of treatment, recovery, and support services throughout the entire process of reentry for women.

Programs:

- Helping Women Recover: Program designed for treating substance abuse. This focuses on issues such as self-esteem, parenting, relationships, and spirituality. The program addresses these issues using discussion, activities, and exercises.
- Beyond Trauma: A Healing Journey for Women: This is 11 sessions long and teaches women what trauma is, and how it affects their thoughts and feelings as well as their behavior and relationships. The work is done on coping skills using exercises and videos.
- The Sanctuary Model: This program addresses the issues of mental health, trauma, and substance abuse. This focuses on safety and grieving to build individual empowerment.
- Seeking Safety: Program for women that have substance dependence and also PTSD. This focuses on five key elements: safety, treatment of PTSD and substance abuse, ideals, behavioral and interpersonal therapies, and therapist processes.
- The Addiction and Trauma Recovery Integration Model (ATRIUM): psycho-educational 12-week-long program. This is designed to intervene on levels of the body, mind and spirit.
- The Trauma Recovery and Empowerment Model (TREM): psycho-educational group that includes survival empowerment, self-soothing, and problem solving. This last 33 sessions over nine months.

These programs help women to not feel depressed or overwhelmed by the community once they are allowed to reenter them. There are two agencies that help these women as well, more well known as a settlement house.

- Our Place: This is located in Washington D.C. and focuses mainly on family reunification. This helps women reunite with family, and find housing and employment. This program helps women find the help needed whether it be mental help or substance abuse treatment.
- The Refugee Model: The Catholic Church works to assist the parolees and support their transitioning. This helps to make the women feel like someone is looking after them and encouraging them as they work to reenter the community. System organizations that are used to help women's reentry into the community consist of mental health, alcohol and drug programs, programs to help survivors and sexual violence, family services, food shelters, financial help programs, employment services, child care services, and community service clubs.

A continuity-of-care approach is taken when forming these programs for women. This is the providing of treatment, recovery, and support services throughout the entire process of reentry for women.

== Media portrayal ==
Despite all the things that incarcerated women endure prior to, during, and after their imprisonment, people often have a certain mindset regarding who they are. This is as a result of the inaccuracy the media uses to portray women who are detained; perpetuating the idea that there is nothing more to them than violence and sexual tension. The media's tendency to highlight the aspects of prison life that they deem suitable or entertaining for viewers really serves to belittle and shed attention away from the real issues that incarceration has on the women living their 'truth'. The way that these women are portrayed in the media is crucial to our understanding of their struggles and our ability to empathize with the traumatic experience that is serving time in prison. Instead, they are portrayed with a 'babes behind bars' theme.

Films such as The Big Doll House (1971), The Big Bird Cage (1972) and Caged Heat (1974) are examples of movies that depict these women as sex-crazed and distort our knowledge from the more universal and serious issues that come with being incarcerated. Such media leads to the misrepresentation of women's issues while incarcerated.

Very little factual representation is contained in these films. It is Hollywood, after all; they do not necessarily seek to educate—instead they aim to titillate: These tales of vulnerable young things navigating a harsh prison are largely vehicles for money shot–style images that are the films' raison d'être: a roomful of women being hosed down by their sadistic warden as punishment (1971's Big Doll House) . . . or a young reform-school inmate gang-raped with a plunger by her roommates (1974's Born Innocent)".

== See also ==
- Category:Women's prisons in the United States
- LGBT people in prison § United States
- Orange is the New Black
- Orange Is the New Black: My Year in a Women's Prison
- Race in the United States criminal justice system § Black women
- Women's Prison Association
