= Mentally ill people in United States jails and prisons =

Incarceration of people with psychiatric disorders

People with mental illnesses are over-represented in jail and prison populations in the United States relative to the general population.

There are three times as many mentally ill people in jails and prisons than in hospitals in the United States. Mentally ill people are subjected to solitary confinement at disproportionate rates compared to the general prison population. There are a number of reasons for this over-representation of mentally ill people in jails and prisons, including the deinstitutionalization of mentally ill individuals in the mid-twentieth century, inadequate community treatment resources, and the criminalization of mental illness itself. Research has shown that mentally ill offenders have comparable rates of recidivism to non-mentally ill offenders.

The United States Supreme Court has upheld the right of inmates to mental health treatment. The majority of prisons in the United States attempt to employ a mental health providers. However, there is a severe shortage of staff to fill these vacancies and it is difficult to retain employees.

== Prevalence ==
There is a broad scholarly consensus that mentally ill individuals are over-represented within the jail and prison populations of the United States.

In a 2010 study, researchers concluded that, based on statistics from sources including the Bureau of Justice Statistics and the U.S. Department of Health and Human Services, there are currently three times more seriously mentally ill people in jails and prisons than in hospitals in the United States, with the ratio being nearly ten to one in Arizona and Nevada. "Serious mental illness" is defined here as schizophrenia, bipolar disorder, or major depression. Further, they found that 16% of the jail and prison population in the U.S. has a serious mental illness (compared to 6.4% in 1983), although this statistic does not reflect differences among individual states. For example, in North Dakota, they found that a person with a serious mental illness is equally likely to be in prison or jail versus a hospital. In contrast, in states such as Arizona, Nevada, and Texas, the imbalance is much more severe. Finally, they noted that a 1991 survey by the National Alliance for the Mentally Ill concluded that jail and/or prison are part of the life experiences of forty percent of these mentally ill individuals. In addition to mood and anxiety disorders, other psychopathologies have also been found in the US prison System. Antisocial personality disorder is found in less than 6% of the general American population, but seems to be found in anywhere between 12% and 64% of prison samples. Estimates of borderline personality disorder seem to make up around 1% to 2% of the general public, compared to 12% to 30% within prisons. Personality disorders, especially in the inmate population, are often found to be comorbid with other disorders.

A separate research study, The Prevalence of Mental Illness among Inmates in a Rural State, noted that national statistics like those previously mentioned primarily pull data from urban jails and prisons. To investigate possible differences in rural areas, researchers interviewed a random sample of inmates in both jails and prisons in a rural northeastern state. They found that in this rural setting, there was little evidence of high rates of mental illness within jails, "suggesting the criminalization of mental illness may not be as evident in rural settings as urban areas." However, high rates of serious mental illness were found among rural prison inmates.

=== 2015 studies ===
In 2015, lawyer and activist Bryan Stevenson claimed in his book Just Mercy that over 50% of inmates in jails and prisons in the United States had been diagnosed with a mental illness and that one in five jail inmates had had a serious mental illness. As for the gender, age, and racial demographics of mentally ill offenders, the 2017 Bureau of Justice Statistics report found that female inmates, when compared to male inmates, had statistically significantly higher rates of serious psychological distress (20.5% of female prisoners and 32.3% of female jail inmates had serious psychological distress, versus 14% of male prisoners and 25.5% of male jail inmates) and a history of a mental health problem (65.8% of female prisoners and 67.9% of female jail inmates compared to 34.8% of male prisoners and 40.8% of male jail inmates). Significant differences between race and ethnicity were also observed. White prisoners and jail inmates were more likely to have serious psychological distress or a history of mental health problems than black or Hispanic inmates. For example, in local jails, 31% of white inmates had serious psychological distress compared to 22.3% of black inmates and 23.2% of Hispanic inmates. Finally, regarding age, there were virtually no statistical differences between age groups and the percentage of those with serious psychological distress or a history of a mental health problem.

=== 2017 studies ===
A 2017 report issued by the Bureau of Justice Statistics used self-reported survey data from inmates to assess the prevalence of mental health problems among prisoners and jail inmates. They found that 14% of prisoners and 25% of jail inmates had experienced serious psychological distress in the past 30 days, compared to 5% of the general population. In addition, 37% of prisoners and 44% of jail inmates had a history of mental health problems.

== Potential reasons for the high number of incarcerated people diagnosed with mental illnesses ==
=== Deinstitutionalization ===
Researchers commonly cite deinstitutionalization, or the emptying of state mental hospitals in the mid-twentieth century, as a direct cause of the rise of mentally ill people in prisons. In the 2010 study "More mentally ill persons are in jails and prisons than hospitals: a survey of the states," researchers noted that, at least in part due to deinstitutionalization, it is increasingly difficult to find beds for mentally ill people who need hospitalization. Using data collected by the Department of Health and Human Services, they determined there was one psychiatric bed for every 3,000 Americans, compared to one for every 300 Americans in 1955. They also noted increased percentages of mentally ill people in prisons throughout the 1970s and 1980s and found a strong correlation between the number of mentally ill people in a state's jails and prisons and how much money the state spends on mental health services. In the book Criminalizing the Seriously Mentally Ill: The Abuse of Jails as Mental Hospitals, researchers note that while deinstitutionalization was carried out with good intentions, it was not accompanied by alternate avenues for mental health treatment for those with serious mental illnesses. According to the authors, Community Mental Health Centers focused their limited resources on individuals with less serious mental illnesses; federal training funds for mental health professionals resulted in lots more psychiatrists in wealthy areas but not in low-income areas; and a policy that made individuals eligible for federal programs and benefits only after they'd been discharged from state mental hospitals unintentionally incentivized discharging patients without follow-up.

In the article Assessing the Contribution of the Deinstitutionalization of the Mentally Ill to Growth in the U.S. Incarceration Rate, researchers Steven Raphael and Michael A. Stoll discuss trans institutionalization, or how many patients released from mental hospitals in the mid-twentieth century ended up in jail or prison. Using U.S. census data collected between 1950 and 2000, they concluded that "those most likely to be incarcerated as of the 2000 census experienced pronounced increases in overall institutionalization between 1950 and 2000 (with particularly large increases for black males). Thus, the impression created by aggregate trends is somewhat misleading, as the 1950 demographic composition of the mental hospital population differs considerably from the 2000 demographic composition of prison and jail inmates." However, when estimating (using a panel data set) how many individuals incarcerated between 1980 and 2000 would have been institutionalized in years past, they found significant trans institutionalization rates for all men and women, with the largest rate for white men.

=== Accessibility ===
A main contributing factor to the US's steady increase in those who are mentally ill within the prison system could be the lack of accessibility in various communities. Specifically, those who come from a lower-income background face these issues, in which there are few to no readily available resources for those experiencing ongoing difficulty with their mental health. The AMA Journal of Ethics discusses more specific factors contributing to the consistently high arrest rates of those with severe mental illness within certain communities, stating that the arrests of drug offenders, a lack of affordable housing, and a significant lack of funding for community treatments are the main contributors. With the introduction of Medicaid, many state-run mental health facilities closed due to a shared responsibility for funding with the federal government. Eventually, states would close a good portion of their facilities so that mentally ill patients could be treated at hospitals where they would be partially covered by Medicaid and the government. The National Council for Behavioral Health conducted a study in October 2018 that included survey results that confirmed "nearly six in 10 (56%) Americans [are] seeking or wanting to seek mental health services either for themselves or for a loved one..." These individuals are skewing younger and are more likely to be of lower income and military background”.

=== Criminalization ===
A related cause of the disproportionate number of mentally ill people in prisons is the criminalization of mental illness itself. In the 1984 study Criminalizing mental disorder: The comparative arrest rate of the mentally ill, researcher L. A. Taplin notes that in addition to a decline in federal support for mental illness resulting in more people being denied treatment, mentally ill people are often stereotyped as dangerous, making fear a factor in action taken against them. Bureaucratic and legal impediments to initiating mental health referrals mean arrest can be easier, and in Taplin's words, "Due to the lack of exclusionary criteria, the criminal justice system may have become the institution that cannot say no." Mentally ill people do indeed experience higher arrest rates than those without mental illness, but to investigate whether or not this was due to the criminalization of mental illness, researchers observed police officers over a period of time. As a result, they concluded that "within similar situations, persons exhibiting signs of mental disorder have a higher probability of being arrested than those who do not show such signs."

The authors of the book Criminalizing the Seriously Mentally Ill: The Abuse of Jails as Mental Hospitals claim that nationwide, 29% of jails will hold mentally ill individuals with no charges brought against them, sometimes as a means of 'holding' them when psychiatric hospitals are very far away. This practice occurs even in states where it is explicitly forbidden. Beyond that, the vast majority of people with mental illnesses in jails and prisons are held on minor charges like theft, disorderly conduct, alcohol or drug-related charges, and trespassing. These are sometimes "mercy bookings" intended to get the homeless mentally ill off the street, a warm meal, etc. Family members have reported being encouraged by mental health professionals or the police to get their loved ones arrested to get them treatment. Finally, some mentally ill people are in jails and prisons on serious charges, such as murder. Many such crimes would likely not have been committed had the individuals been receiving proper care.

=== Malingering ===
Some inmates feign psychiatric symptoms for secondary gain. For example, an inmate may hope to receive a transfer to a more desirable setting or psychotropic medication.

=== Exacerbation of mental illness in a prison setting ===
Another proposed reason for the high number of people incarcerated with mental illness is the way a prison setting can worsen mental health. Individuals with pre-existing mental health conditions can worsen, or new mental health problems may arise. A few reasons are listed as to how prisons can worsen the mental health of the incarcerated:

- Separation from loved ones
- Lack of movement or isolation
- Overcrowded prisons
- Witnessing violence in the prison setting

== Mental health care in prisons and jails ==
Psychologists report that one in every eight prisoners was receiving some mental health therapy or counseling services by mid-2000. Inmates are generally screened at admission, and depending on the severity of the mental illness, they are placed in either general confinement or specialized facilities. Inmates can self-report mental illness if they feel it is necessary. In mid-2000, inmates self-reported that state prisons held 191,000 mentally ill inmates.

A 2011 survey of 230 correctional mental health service providers from 165 state correctional facilities found that 83% of facilities employed at least one psychologist and 81% employed at least one psychiatrist. The study also found that 52% of mentally ill offenders voluntarily received mental health services, 24% were referred by staff, and 11% were mandated by a court to receive services. Although 64% of providers of mental health services reported feeling supported by prison administration and 71% were involved in continuity of care after release from prison, 65% reported being dissatisfied with funding. Only 16% of participants reported offering vocational training, and the researchers noted that although risk/need/responsiveness theory has been shown to reduce the risk of recidivism (or committing another crime after being released), it is unknown whether it is incorporated into mental health services in prisons and jails. A 2017 report from the Bureau of Justice Statistics noted that 54.3% of prisoners and 35% of jail inmates who had experienced serious psychological distress in the past 30 days have received mental health treatment since admission to the current facility, and 63% of prisoners and 44.5% of jail inmates with a history of a mental health problem said they had received mental health treatment since admission.

A 2005 article by researcher Terry A. Kuper's noted that male prisoners tend to under report emotional problems and don't request help until a crisis, and that prison fosters an environment of toxic masculinity, which increases resistance to psychotherapy. In addition, inmates being assessed for their sanity might be inclined to avoid receiving necessary medical treatment which would make their symptoms seem less severe.

Finally, the book Criminalizing the Seriously Mentally Ill: The Abuse of Jails as Mental Hospitals points out that 20% of jails have no mental health resources. In addition, small jails are less likely to have access to mental health resources and are more likely to hold individuals with mental illnesses without charges brought against them. Jails in richer areas are more likely to have access to mental health resources, and jails with more access to mental health resources also deal with fewer medication refusals.

== Recidivism ==
Research shows that rates of recidivism, or re-entry into prison, are not significantly higher for mentally ill offenders. A 2004 study found that although 77% of mentally ill offenders studied were arrested or charged with a new crime within the 27–55-month follow-up period, when compared with the general population, "our mentally ill inmates were neither more likely nor more serious recidivists than general population inmates." In contrast, a 2009 study that examined the incarceration history of those in Texas Department of Criminal Justice facilities found that "Texas prison inmates with major psychiatric disorders were far more likely to have had previous incarcerations compared with inmates without a serious mental illness." In the discussion, the researchers noted that their study's results differed from most research on this subject and hypothesized that this novelty could be due to specific conditions within the state of Texas.

A 1991 study by L. Feder noted that although mentally ill offenders were significantly less likely to receive support from family and friends upon release from prison, they were actually less likely to be revoked on parole. However, mentally ill offenders were less likely to have the charges dropped for nuisance arrests, although they were more likely to have charges dropped for drug arrests. In both cases, mentally ill offenders were more likely to be tracked into mental health care. Finally, there were no significant differences in charges for violent arrests.

=== Tools for effective mental healthcare ===
A research paper published in 2020 by M. Georgiou remarked that having a well-defined consultation process for mental health services will allow for effective care. This is called the Care Programmer Approach. It lists six steps to effective care of the prisoner:

1. Identify the health and care needs of the prisoner.
2. Written and clear plans.
3. Having key persons supervise the program.
4. Regular assessments of the program.
5. Inter-professional involvement.
6. Career involvement.

== Solitary confinement ==
A broad range of scholarly research maintains that mentally ill offenders are disproportionately represented in solitary confinement and are more vulnerable to the adverse psychological effects of solitary confinement. Due to differing schemes of classification, empirical data on the makeup of inmates in segregated housing units can be difficult to obtain, and estimates of the percentage of inmates in solitary confinement who are mentally ill range from nearly a third, to 11% (with a "major mental disorder"), to 30% (from a study conducted in Washington), to "over half" (from a study conducted in Indiana), depending on how mental illness is determined, where the study is conducted, and other differences in methodology. Researchers J. Metzner and J. Fellner note that mentally ill offenders in solitary confinement "all too frequently" require crisis care or psychiatric hospitalization and that "many simply won't get better as long as they are isolated." Researchers T. L. Hafemeister and J. George note that mentally ill offenders in isolation are at higher risk for psychiatric injury, self-harm, and suicide. A 2014 study that analyzed data from medical records in the New York City jail system found that while self-harm was significantly correlated with having a serious mental illness regardless of whether or not an inmate was in solitary confinement, inmates with serious mental illness in solitary confinement under 18 years of age accounted for the majority of acts of self-harm studied. When brought before federal courts, judges have prohibited or curtailed this practice, and many organizations that deal with human rights, including the United Nations, have condemned it.

In addition, scholars argue that the conditions of solitary confinement make it much more difficult to deliver proper psychiatric care. According to researchers J. Metzner and J. Fellner, "Mental health services in segregation units are typically limited to psychotropic medication, a health care clinician stopping at the cell front to ask how the prisoner is doing (i.e., mental health rounds), and occasional meetings in private with a clinician." One study in the American Journal of Public Health claimed that health care professionals must "frequently" conduct consultations through a slit in a cell door or an open tier that provides no privacy.

However, some researchers disagree with the scope of claims surrounding the psychological effects of solitary confinement. For example, in 2006, researchers G. D. Glancy and E. L. Murray conducted a literature review in which they claimed that many frequently-cited studies have methodological concerns, including researcher bias, the use of "volunteer Non prisoners, naturalistic experiments, or case reports, case series, and anecdotes", and concluded "there is little evidence to suggest the majority...kept in SC...experience negative mental health effects." However, they did support claims that inmates with preexisting mental illnesses are more vulnerable and do suffer adverse effects. In their conclusion, they claim, "we should therefore be concerned about those with pre-existing mental illness who are housed in segregation because there is nowhere else to put them within the correctional system."

== Community standpoint and outcome ==
Social stigma regarding this issue is significant due to the public's outlook and perception of mental health; some may not recognize it as a health factor that must be addressed. For this reason, some may avoid or deny the assistance offered to them, thus further suppressing feelings and experiences that eventually need to be dealt with. The NCBH notes that about one-third (or 38%) of Americans worry about their peers and family judging them if they seek mental help.

Without the presence of these facilities within communities, mentally ill individuals would carry on with no preventative treatment or care to keep the severity of their condition at a healthy level. About 2 million of these individuals go to jail each year; moreover, data shows that 15% of men and 30% of women who are taken to prison have a serious mental health condition. The National Alliance on Mental Illness further looked into the results of decreased mental health services, and they found that for many, individuals do ultimately become homeless or find themselves in emergency rooms as a result of the inaccessibility of mental health services and support groups. Statistics show that about 83% of jail inmates did not have access to needed treatment within their community before their incarceration, and so some people end up getting re-arrested as a way to return to some form of assistance. The Marshall Project has gathered data regarding those being treated in jail, and what they found was that the Federal Bureau of Prisons implicated a new policy to be initiated that was meant to improve the care for inmates with mental health issues. It ultimately led to a decrease in the number of inmates who were categorized as needing higher care levels by more than 35%. After this policy change, the Marshall Project noted the steady decline since May 2014 of inmates receiving treatment for a mental illness. Research shows that in recent years, those with “serious psychotic disorders, especially when untreated, can be more likely to commit a violent crime”.

It is said that an institutional shift would be more effective in reducing the number of incarcerated people through the collaboration of multiple agencies, especially regarding the criminal justice system and the community. This collaboration between agencies deviates from the "self-perpetuating" system meant to incarcerate and process individuals administratively; therefore, it focuses closely on people with severe mental illness and ensures ongoing care within and out of prison to reduce recidivism.

== Legal aspects ==
=== Current laws ===
The Federal Bureau of Prisons has claimed to have made policy changes, but those changes only apply to the rules within the system, and they did not fund resources to carry out those new implementations. It should also be noted that within the prison system, states have laws and responsibilities to ensure as well, one of which is the Eighth amendment, which requires prisoners' medical needs to be consistently met. The Prison Litigation Reform Act upholds this right in federal court cases.

As of late December 2018, the First Step Act (S 756) was signed into law as a way to reduce recidivism and provide overall improvements to the conditions faced within federal prisons, as well as working to reduce the mandatory sentences given. Although this Act primarily applies to about 225.000, or 10%, of individuals in federal prisons and jails, this reform may not be applied to those in state prisons and jails. Some of the provisions resulting from this act include staff training on how to identify and assist those suffering from a mental illness and providing improved, accessible treatment regarding drug abuse with programs like medication-assisted treatment.

The implementation of significantly more Certified Community Behavioral Health Clinics has also been discussed as a solution to the mental health issue in the prison system. Its primary goal is to cater to the needs of its specific communities and expand access to mental health treatment for everyone. An organization like this claims to reduce criminal justice costs, hospital re-admissions, and, once again, recidivism. They strive to treat individuals with mental illness early on rather than allowing them to carry on without professional care and general support.

Another proposed solution is to guarantee access to emergency medical care during a health crisis. The Medical Civil Rights Act was created to establish such a right, including during a behavioral health crisis. Specifically, this act would guarantee that prisoners, and other persons who experience law-enforcement contact, have an affirmative right to emergency medical care . It has already been enacted in Connecticut, and is to be introduced in the remaining 49 states and federally. This act is anticipated to prevent numerous avoidable custodial deaths, and to reduce costs associated with litigation, which seeks to compensate for such deaths.

=== Emergency detention ===
One major area of legal concern is the emergency detention of the non-criminal mentally ill in jails while waiting for formal procedures for involuntary hospitalization. Twenty-five states and the District of Columbia have laws specifically addressing this practice; eight of these states and D.C. explicitly forbid it. Seventeen states, on the other hand, explicitly allow it. Within this set, the criteria and circumstances necessary differ by state. Most states limit the detention periods in jails to one to three days. One distinguishing factor of this practice is that it is often initiated by a non-medical professional, such as a police officer. In many states, especially those in which a non-public official such as a medical health professional or concerned citizen can initiate the detention, a judge or magistrate is required to approve it before or soon after the initiation.

When emergency detention in jails has been brought to court, judges generally agree that the practice is not unconstitutional. One notable exception was Lynch v. Baxley; however, later cases, particularly Boston v. Lafayette County, Mississippi, have connected the ruling of unconstitutionality in that case with the conditions of the jails themselves rather than the fact that they were jails. That being said, the Supreme Court of Illinois has stated that this practice is unconstitutional if the person being detained doesn't pose an imminent threat to himself or others.

=== Supreme court cases ===
Several landmark Supreme Court cases, notably Estelle v. Gamble, have established the constitutional right of prison inmates to mental health treatment. Estelle v. Gamble determined that "deliberate indifference to serious medical needs" of prisoners was a violation of the Eighth Amendment to the U.S. Constitution. This case was the first time the phrase "deliberate indifference" was used; it is now legal. To determine "serious medical need" later cases would use tests such as the treatment mandated by a physician or an obvious need to a layman. On the other hand, other cases, notably McGuckin v. Smith, used much stricter terms, and in 1993 researchers Henry J. Steadman and Joseph J. Cocozza commented that "serious medical need" had little definitional clarity. Langley v. Coughlin involved a prisoner "regularly isolated without proper screening or care" and clarified that a single, distinctive act is not necessary to constitute deliberate indifference but rather "if seriously ill inmates are consistently made to wait for care while their condition deteriorates, or if diagnoses are haphazard and records minimally adequate then, over time, the mental state of deliberate indifference may be attributed to those in charge."

The landmark case Washington v. Harper determined that although inmates do have an interest in and the right to refuse treatment, this can be overridden without judicial process even if the inmate is competent, provided there this act is "reasonably related to legitimate penological interest". Washington's internal process for determining this need was seen as affording due process. In contrast, in Breads v. Moehrle, the forcible injection of drugs in jail was not upheld because sufficient procedures were not taken to ensure "substantive determination of need".

=== Court cases ===
George Daniel, a mentally ill man on Alabama's death row was arrested and charged with capital murder. In jail, George became acutely psychotic and couldn't speak in complete sentences. Daniel had been on death row until several years later, Lawyer Bryan Stevenson uncovered the truth about the doctor who lied about examining Daniels's mental illness. Daniel's trial was then overturned and he has been in a mental institution since.

Another mentally ill man, Avery Jenkins, was convicted of murder and sentenced to death. Throughout Jenkins's childhood, he had been in and out of foster homes and developed a serious mental illness. Jenkins erratic behavior didn't change, so his foster mother decided to get rid of him by tying him to a tree and leaving him there. Around the age of sixteen, he was left homeless and started to experience psychotic episodes. At age twenty, Jenkins had wandered into a strange house and stabbed a man to death as he perceived him to be a demon. He was then sentenced to death and spent several years in prison as if he had been sane and responsible for his actions. Jenkins then got off death row and was put into a mental institution.

In the past, overall living and treatment conditions within US prisons were not up to par, which can be seen through the details and points made by the Coleman v. Brown case that went to trial in 1995. In this case, The district court judge ultimately recognized the system's systemic failure to properly care for and provide resources to mentally ill inmates. These individuals were not receiving treatment prior to prison, and were sent there with expectations from others that they would be receiving treatment there, but that expectation was not fulfilled.

In Coleman v. Brown, a special court, including three judges that can make final decisions on whether or not a problem is significant enough to enact change, concluded that overcrowding was in fact a reason for poor conditions in prisons, therefore they called for a reduction in the prison population to partially relieve said issue. Justice Alito at this time questioned whether the reduction solution was helpful when they could be looking into constructing additional prison medical and mental health facilities. Although, the decision did not take care of the living conditions that were problematic before and even after the case. It has been noted that psychotic prisoners were often held in small, narrow essentially restricted areas where standing on their secretions was common. Regarding actual mental health treatment conditions, the waiting time to even receive care could take up to a year, and when they finally reached that date, the screenings for such lacked privacy for those being evaluated as several physicians often shared the spaces at a time.

Other cases that have been discussed is John Rudd, who was being a federal prison in West Virginia as of 2017. Rudd had a history of mental health disorders consisting of post traumatic stress disorder, as well as schizophrenia. He was evaluated and diagnosed by a doctor as early as 1992. In 2017, he stopped taking his psychiatric medication, then informed staff of his intentions to take his own life. Staff put him in a suicide watch cell, where he would physically and violently hurt himself. Staff injected him with haloperidol, an anti-psychotic drug, to treat him, but after some time they concluded that Rudd was not ill enough to receive proper, regular treatment and continued to categorize him as a level one inmate, meaning no significant mental health needs. Although they were aware of his pre-existing conditions, the prison staff claimed those were resolved and adjusted it to Rudd having an antisocial personality disorder.

On December 7, 2020, Thomas Lee Rutledge died of hyperthermia at the home of William E. Donaldson in Bessemer. According to a lawsuit filed by his sister, Rutledge had a core temperature of 109 degrees when he was found unconscious in his psychiatric cell. Listed as defendants were the prison staff, guards, and contractors.

A more recent case is that a mentally ill man froze to death at an Alabama jail as of 2023, according to a lawsuit filed by the man’s family who say he was kept naked in a concrete cell and believe he was also placed in a freezer or other frigid environment. According to the lawsuit, Anthony Don Mitchell, 33, arrived at the hospital's emergency room with a body temperature of 72 degrees (22 degrees Fahrenheit) and was pronounced dead hours later. He was rushed to the hospital on January 26 from the Walker County Jail, where he had been held for two weeks. The paramedic who tried unsuccessfully to resuscitate Mitchell writes, "I believe hypothermia was the ultimate cause of death," according to a lawsuit filed by Mitchell's mother in federal court Monday. Mitchell, who had a history of substance abuse, was arrested on January 12, 2023, after a cousin asked authorities to check on his well-being for wandering through portals to heaven and hell at his home and suffering a nervous breakdown. According to the lawsuit, prison video shows Mitchell being held naked in a solitary cell with a concrete floor. The lawsuit speculates that Mitchell was also taken to the prison kitchen "freezer" or similar freezing environment and left there for hours "because his body temperature was so low."

Prison staff in general, have also been experiencing issues for various years now. Previously in the 1990s, just about one-third of positions went unfilled for mental health staff, and it became increasingly impactful on inmates when the vacancy rates for psychiatrists reached 50% and up. Staffing shortage is still seen today in which some counselors can be pulled and asked to serve as corrections officers for the time being. This situation had worsened due to the first Trump administration and the hiring freeze that was meant to reduce costs. Rudd, now out of prison and receiving counselling and taking medication, speaks on triggers within the prison environment that are not in any way healthy for those who are mentally ill.

== See also ==
- Homelessness and mental health § Incarceration
- Mental health among female offenders in the United States
- Incarceration in the United States
- Juvenile delinquency § Psychological
- LGBT people in prison
- Mental health court
- Mental health issues in American women's prisons
- Prison abolition movement § Mental illness and prison
- United States incarceration rate
