= C10H17NO =

The molecular formula C_{10}H_{17}NO (molar mass: 167.25 g/mol, exact mass: 167.1310 u) may refer to:

- Benzyltrimethylammonium hydroxide
- N-Cyclohexyl-2-pyrrolidone
