= Linda Teplin =

Public health researcher and behavioral health scientist

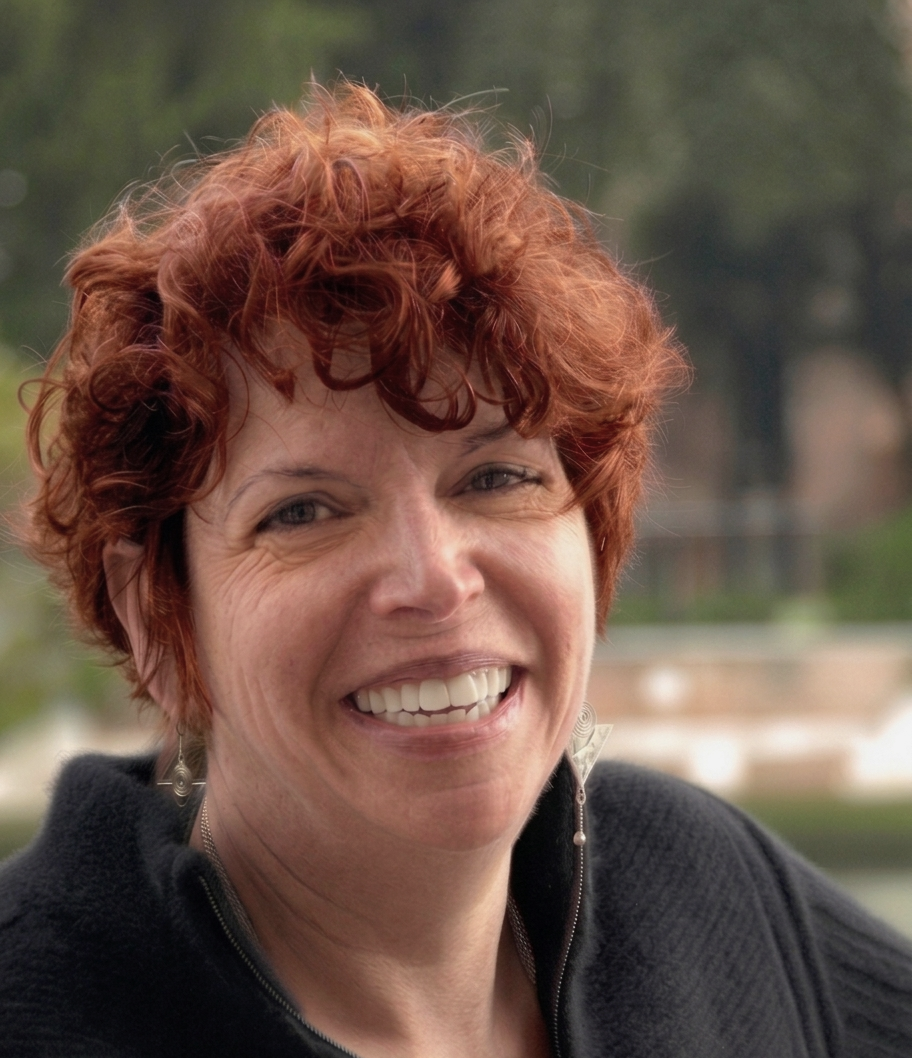
- Born: October 13, 1950 (age 76)
- Occupations: Owen L. Coon Professor of Psychiatry and Behavioral Sciences Vice Chair for Research, Department of Psychiatry and Behavioral Sciences Director of Health Disparities and Public Policy Program

Academic background
- Education: Northwestern University, Ph.D., M.A. Roosevelt University, B.A.

Academic work
- Discipline: Behavioral Science, Public Health
- Institutions: Northwestern University Feinberg School of Medicine

Linda A. Teplin is an American behavioral scientist and public health researcher. Her research focuses on the interface between mental health and the criminal justice system, criminalization of the mentally ill, and mental health needs and related health outcomes of incarcerated populations, including those in juvenile detention, jails, and prisons. Many of her published papers investigate the prevalence of psychiatric disorders, mortality, patterns of crime victimization, health service utilization, disproportionate incarceration of minorities, and HIV/AIDS risk behaviors. Her research has provided the empirical basis for changes in public health and criminal justice policy.

== Career ==
Teplin received her Ph.D. degree in sociology from Northwestern University in Evanston, IL in 1975 with a specialty in social psychology. Later that same year, she joined Northwestern University Feinberg School of Medicine’s Psychiatry and Behavioral Sciences Department as an assistant professor. Currently, she is the Owen L. Coon Professor and vice chair of research in the Department of Psychiatry and Behavioral Sciences, and the director of the Health Disparities and Public Policy Program, which she founded. Teplin also serves as the Principal Investigator of the Northwestern Juvenile Project and its substudy, Next Generation, the first prospective intergenerational study of a correctional population. Her newest project is Consequences of Incarceration on Health, Age-Related Conditions, and Risk Factors for ADRD (Alzheimer's disease and related dementias).

She has received 16 R01 grants from five institutes and three centers of the National Institutes of Health, a MERIT Award from the National Institute of Mental Health and many grants from the Office of Juvenile Justice and Delinquency Prevention, the National Institute of Justice, the Centers for Disease Control and Prevention, and other federal agencies and private foundations. Her work has been cited in reports of the Surgeon General, amicus briefs to the Supreme Court, congressional hearings, and by advocacy groups. Teplin has also been featured in numerous media outlets, including The New York Times, HuffPost, The Washington Post, the Chicago Tribune, ScienceDaily, NBC, CNN, and NPR.

== Research ==
Teplin has served as Principal Investigator of more than a dozen large-scale empirical investigations, funded by over 25 federal agencies and private foundations. Her projects include the following.

Begun in 1980, her first study investigated one of the unintended consequences of deinstitutionalization: criminalization of the mentally ill. Deinstitutionalization resulted in thousands of persons with psychotic and major mood disorders discharged to their communities without adequate mental health services. Police were increasingly required to manage these people, many of whom were homeless. Public health experts speculated that persons with mental disorders were arrested as a mechanism to manage them in the community, but there had been little evidence and no large-scale empirical studies to investigate this hypothesis. To address the "criminalization hypothesis," Teplin conducted an observational study of police officers and how they managed in their new-found role as streetcorner psychiatrists. The study, funded by the National Institute of Mental Health, found that because of inadequacies in the mental health system, persons with psychotic and major mood disorders had twice the arrest rate of those without a mental disorder, suggesting that incarceration had supplanted treatment.

Her next study followed up on this finding by studying jails. Teplin investigated the prevalence of psychiatric disorders in jail detainees, first studying males in 1983 and then females in 1991. Funded by grants from the National Institute of Mental Health, she also investigated whether persons who needed mental health services received them. She found that 62% of male and 81% of female jail detainees had any psychiatric disorder. In addition, 31% of male and 19% of female jail detainees had a psychotic or major mood disorder. However, only 37% of these males and 20% of these females received treatment.

In 1995, Teplin used her MERIT award to launch the Northwestern Victimization Project, the first large-scale longitudinal study that investigated crime victimization of the mentally ill. This study addressed a key omission in the field. Prior studies had focused on the perpetration of crime by persons with psychiatric disorders, not on victimization. Teplin examined the rates, risk factors, and victimization patterns of 936 individuals with mental disorders who lived in the community. She discovered that over one quarter of the sample had been victims of violent crimes, a rate more than 11 times higher than that of the general population.

Teplin is currently the Principal Investigator of the Northwestern Juvenile Project, the first large-scale epidemiological longitudinal study of mental health needs and outcomes of youth after detention. The project has tracked and conducted up to 13 follow-up interviews with a sample of 1,829 randomly selected youth who had been arrested and detained between 1995 and 1998. Articles have addressed psychiatric disorders, substance abuse, firearm victimization, trauma, HIV/AIDS, mortality, and psychosocial outcomes such as employment, educational attainment, and parenting. Entering detention, 74% females and 66% males had at least one psychiatric disorder. Of these, most participants had one or more comorbid disorders. Long-term outcomes were also poor for many of the participants. By 12 years after detention, only half of the original cohort had earned high school degrees or equivalent, three quarters of the sample had been reincarcerated at least once in an adult facility, and over 90% had one or more substance use disorders. Racial and ethnic differences contradicted modern stereotypes: Non-Hispanic white detainees had more than 30 times the odds of having an addiction to a hard drug such as cocaine or heroin compared to Black detainees. Death rates were far greater than in the general population. By 16 years after detention, 120 (6.6%) participants had died, nearly all violently; over a quarter had been injured or killed by firearms. By 25 years after detention, 88 (4.8%) had died from firearm injuries alone. This death rate is over four times that of the general population for Black males and over three times that of the general population for Hispanic males.

Teplin is also the Principal Investigator of Next Generation, where she studies the original participants of the Northwestern Juvenile Project and their children. She is studying the consequences parent's incarceration on their children and intergenerational patterns of substance use disorders, firearm victimization, firearm perpetration, and delinquency. The newest sub-study, Consequences of Incarceration on Health, Age-Related Conditions, and Risk Factors for ADRD, is funded by the National Institutes of Health (the National Institute on Aging). It is the first comprehensive study of how the dose of incarceration—frequency and duration of stays, type of facility (juvenile detention, jail, prison), age(s), and recency—affects health, age-related conditions, and risk factors for Alzheimer's disease and related dementias.

== Awards and honors ==
- American Public Health Association (APHA), 2024 APHA Award for Excellence
- American Association for the Advancement of Science, Elected Fellow (2023)
- American Psychology-Law Society, Award for Distinguished Contributions to Psychology and Law (2022)
- Association for Psychological Science, Elected Fellow (2019)
- American Psychiatric Rehabilitation Association, Armin Loeb Award (2014)
- US House Committee on Education and Labor, Subcommittee on Healthy Families and Communities, Invited Congressional Testimony, Meeting the Challenges Faced by Girls in the Juvenile Justice System (2010)
- National Commission on Correctional Health Care, Bernard P. Harrison Award of Merit (2001)
- National Institute of Mental Health, Method to Extend Research in Time Award (1994)
- American Psychological Association, Award for Distinguished Contributions to Research in Public Policy (1992)
- National Alliance for the Mentally Ill, Young Scientist Award (1990)
- American Psychological Association Divisions 27, 35, 41, 50; Fellow (1986)

== Public Service ==
- National Academies of Sciences, Engineering, and Medicine, Member, Advisory Committee, Division of the Behavioral and Social Sciences and Education (2024–2027)
- Adolescent Brain Cognitive Development Study, Delinquency Substudy, Advisory Board (2021–2023)
- National Judicial Task Force to Examine State Courts' Response to Mental Illness (2020–2022)
- National Academies of Sciences, Engineering, and Medicine; Committee on Law and Justice (2017–2022)
- Office of Juvenile Justice and Delinquency Prevention Subcommittee, Office of Justice Programs, US Department of Justice; Science Advisory Board (2011–2014)
- Office of Juvenile Justice and Delinquency Prevention, US Department of Justice; Task Force on Suicide Prevention for Youth in Contact with the Juvenile Justice System (2011–2013)
- American Bar Association, Commission on Youth at Risk (2006–2011)
- National Academy of Sciences; School Violence Study Committee, National Research Council (2001–2002)
- American Judicature Society, Children and the Law Committee (1998–2003)
- American Bar Association, Commission on Lawyer Assistance Programs (1998–2001)
- National Commission on Correctional Health Care, National Institute of Justice; Expert Panel on Mental Health (1997–2001)
- National Mental Health Association, Children's Mental Health and Juvenile Justice Initiative (1997–2001)
- American Bar Association, Commission on Mental and Physical Disability Law (1989–1996)
