= Mental health among female offenders in the United States =

Women in American prisons encounter numerous difficulties that often involve mental health problems, drug and alcohol issues, and trauma. These challenges not only make navigating the criminal justice system more difficult for women but also highlights broader societal issues such as gender-based violence, economic inequalities, and lack of mental health support. People in prison are more likely than the general United States population to have received a mental disorder diagnosis, and women in prison have higher rates of mental illness and mental health treatment than do men in prison. Furthermore, women in prisons are three times more likely than the general population to report poor physical and mental health. Women are the fastest growing demographic of the United States prison population. As of 2019, there are about 222,500 women incarcerated in state and federal prisons in the United States. Women comprise roughly 8% of all inmates in the United States. This surge is largely attributed to the rising use of imprisonment for drug-related offenses rather than violent crimes. A considerable portion of incarcerated women are serving time for drug-related offenses, with the proportion increasing significantly between 1986 and 1991. Even among those in maximum security facilities, a majority are not imprisoned for violent felonies. The data also reveal that in states like New York, a substantial proportion of incarcerated women are serving time for drug-related offenses, with a smaller percentage incarcerated for violent crimes or property offenses.

In 2011, 11% of male inmates had an overnight hospital stay due to psychiatric problems, while the proportion of women who did was roughly twice that of men. In 2010, 73% of incarcerated women and 55% of incarcerated men self-reported mental health problems. This statistic accounts for the reporting of at least one of two criteria, as a self-reported mental or emotional problem, or a reported overnight hospital stay. Women who end up in prison often have different backgrounds and experiences compared to men. Unfortunately, many women experience further violence while in prison, which is a significant concern for their well-being. According to international human rights law, it is the responsibility of the State to prevent and address violence against women in all contexts, including prisons. The most common mental health problems among incarcerated women are substance abuse/dependence, post-traumatic stress disorder, and depression. Other common disorders include schizophrenia, bipolar disorder, and dysthymia.

== Before crime ==
=== Early experiences of victimization ===
Criminality among females is intimately associated with experiences of trauma and victimization occurring early in life. The majority of incarcerated females have experienced some kind of victimization, defined as experiences of physical, sexual, or emotional trauma. Among female offenders 78% of have reported prior sexual or physical abuse, compared to only 30% of male offenders. Furthermore, "research consistently links histories of violence with negative mental health outcomes, such as depression, substance abuse, and intimate partner violence among incarcerated women at higher rates than those in the general female population". Early experiences of victimization predispose women to be more likely to suffer from certain psychiatric disorders, particularly post-traumatic stress disorder (PTSD), depression, and dysthymia. A study conducted in 2017, found that 60% of participating female inmates had been diagnosed with a mental illness.

Following PTSD and substance abuse/dependence, depression is the third most common psychiatric disorder among incarcerated women. Depression and substance abuse, too, are closely linked with experiences of victimization or PTSD, and more so for women than for men. In fact, according to the National Comorbidity Survey, women are twice as likely as men to experience co-occurring PTSD and depression. The prevalence of depression among incarcerated females links to trends within the general population as well. A study found that of the 54% of incarcerated women diagnosed with lifetime PTSD, 63% reported experiencing three or more traumatic events. Another common mental illness is antisocial personality disorder. It is relatively rare among women in the general non-criminal population, with only about 1 in 100 women being affected by ASPD. But, It is common to find a higher prevalence of ASPD among females who commit criminal offences. This increased prevalence often receives less attention compared to male offenders, who exhibit an even higher occurrence of ASPD. While women are more likely than men to suffer internalized problems, such as anxiety and depression, men are more likely to be treated for externalized problems such as delinquency, aggression, and substance abuse. This difference coincides with a gendered discrepancy in the experiences of mentally ill offenders once they enter the criminal justice system.

=== Victimization and criminal offending ===
In both males and females, sexual abuse, physical abuse, and neglect increase the likelihood of arrest for a juvenile by 59% and as an adult by 28%. Although sociologists do not point to a single explanation for the association between victimization, trauma, and incarceration, researchers have found that trauma frequently cause women to abuse drugs and alcohol as a coping mechanism. Sociologists also point out that early victimization increases the likelihood of women's continued or exacerbated involvement in harmful settings. According to one ethnography of female offenders in Boston, "In fact, running away from home—often to escape abuse in households dominated by violent men—is the charge in the first arrest for nearly a quarter of girls in the juvenile justice system… On the streets, women are vulnerable to harassment, exploitation, and drug use, all of which drag them into the correctional circuit". In addition to symptoms of trauma, other mental health problems such as major depression, schizophrenia, and mania are linked with patterns of violent offending and homelessness prior to arrest.

=== Race ===
The Prison Policy Initiative writes: "Incarcerated women are 53% White, 29% Black, 14% Hispanic, 2.5% American Indian and Alaskan Native, 0.9% Asian, and 0.4% Native Hawaiian and Pacific Islander."

Since the 2000s, the incarceration rates for African American and Hispanic American women have declined, while incarceration rates have increased for white women. Between 2000 and 2017, the incarceration rate for white women increased by 44%, while at the same time declining by 55% for African American women. The Sentencing Project reports that by 2021, incarceration rates had declined by 70% for African American women, while rising by 7% for white women. In 2017, the Washington Post reported that white women's incarceration rate was growing faster than ever before, as the rate for black women declined.

From 2000 to 2009, while incarceration rates declined for Black and Hispanic women, they actually increased for White women. Women who end up in prison often have different profiles compared to men, facing higher levels of abuse, trauma, mental health issues, and substance dependence. These statistics underscore the urgent need for comprehensive support and intervention programs tailored to the specific needs of incarcerated women.

A 2013 study examined the effects of race on the employment opportunities of incarcerated women. Hispanic women with a prison record fared most favorably in receiving a phone call back from potential employers, while African American women had modest results, and white women received the poorest results, having the lowest probability of receiving a phone call from a potential employer. These results were quite different from those of incarcerated men; among them, it was White men who had the best employment opportunities.

=== Substance abuse ===
Substance abuse and dependence are the most common mental health problems among incarcerated females, and drug use is the most common reason for women's incarceration. Many women are drawn into crime as a result of substance abuse, which often stems from a history of abuse, trauma, and neglect. To cope with these experiences, some turn to drugs or alcohol, increasing their chances of encountering the criminal justice system. Substance abuse can exacerbate financial difficulties and lead to involvement in economic crimes. At the end of 2018, 26% of female state prisoners were serving time for drug related offenses. This percentage is double than that of male state prisoners who are serving time for drug related charges. Seventy percent of incarcerated females suffer from drug abuse or dependence, and incarcerated females are nine times more likely than the general population to experience substance abuse and dependence. Social researchers have linked substance abuse to experiences of trauma and victimization.

Sociologists have conducted extensive research in favor of a self-medication hypothesis in relation to women's drug use and abuse, positing that women use drugs as a way to cope with experiences of sexual or physical trauma. Past research suggests that consequences of childhood sexual abuse increase a woman's risk for self-medicating with alcohol and drugs. Incarcerated women with a history of substance abuse are more likely have had prior mental health and criminal justice experiences than incarcerated women with no history of drug abuse.

== In the courts ==
Within the United States justice system, women's criminal activity is more likely than men's to be medicalized, in connection with a tendency to perceive female offenders as "mad, rather than bad." Female offenders are more likely than men to receive psychiatric evaluations, even when they have not self-reported a mental illness. Sociologists have noted that gendered stereotypes among men and women contribute to this discrepancy in mental health evaluations. While criminal behavior and aggression are more associated with masculinity, traits such as passivity and submission are more associated with feminine roles. Female offenders are more likely to be identified as having engaged in role-incongruent or deviant behavior that is explained, diagnosed, and treated psychiatrically. Receiving a psychiatric evaluation reduces the chances that a defendant will have charges dropped against her or him, and also increases the likelihood of conviction, incarceration, and lengthier prison sentences. Because women who have engaged in crime are thought to have violated gender norms, some sociologists posit that female offenders may receive harsher sentences than men. However, among men and women in the general population, sociologists have not reached a consensus on the differences in sentencing, treatment, and leniency among males and females in general. For instance, among juveniles, males are more likely to be arrested, petitioned, and adjudicated than females. Among juvenile females who are sentenced, studies vary on whether these women receive lighter or harsher sentences. Some studies find that women are treated more leniently by courts. Other studies show that juvenile women may be sentenced more harshly than their male counterparts

== During incarceration ==
=== Prevalence of mental illness ===
Several studies have found that rates of mental illness in prisons are higher than those in the general population and that rates of mental illness in women's prisons are higher than those in men's prisons. In 1999 a report for the Department of Justice estimated 16% of the prison population had some form of mental disorder. However, much research in this area "lack[s] specificity regarding important subpopulations, such as female offenders." That work which has looked at female offenders as an "important subpopulation" has found that they experience mental health problems at greater rates than their male counterparts. According to a report through the Bureau of Justice Statistics, female prisoners are about twice as likely than male prisoners to have a history of mental health problems.

A study through the Mental Health Prevalence Project which used "three major indicators of mental illness: diagnosis of a serious mental illness, history of inpatient psychiatric care, and psychotropic medication use" found that female offenders have "on average, twice the rate of various indicators as males." The study found (using a weighted sample) that 17.8% of male offenders and 35.1% of female offenders have a mental health problem upon being committed. This study did not treat substance abuse as a mental health disorder.

Other studies report much higher rates of mental illness among prisoners. One Bureau of Justice Statistics survey in 2004 found that 55% of male inmates and 73% of female inmates self-reported a mental health problem. The Sentencing Project, in their 2007 Briefing Sheets, also report that 73.1% of women in prisons have a mental health problem. Female inmates who experience co-occurring disorders are four times more likely than other female inmates to receive severe disciplinary punishment. No significant relationship has been found between severe punishment and a singular mental health disorder or substance use disorder. Female inmates are more likely than male inmates to be diagnosed with major depression, substance use disorders, developmental disabilities, bipolar disorder, PTSD, eating disorders, schizophrenia, psychosexual dysfunction, and antisocial personality disorder

=== Mental health treatment and services ===
For many offenders, incarceration provides a rare opportunity to access mental health services not available to offenders within their communities. Despite the growing prison population in the United States and the prevalence of mental health problems "In-prison services have not expanded sufficiently to meet treatment needs. In fact, between 1988 and 2000, prison mental health services declined, and those services that are available are concentrated only in the most secure facilities." One study found that 41% of female inmates report use of mental health services while incarcerated, while 73% report mental health problems.

According to the Bureau of Justice Statistics "All Federal prisons and most State prisons and jail jurisdictions, as a matter of policy, provide mental health services to inmates, including screening inmates at intake for mental health problems, providing therapy or counseling by trained mental health professionals, and distributing psychotropic medication." Researchers working with the Mental Health Prevalence Project note that "legal mandates and humanitarian concerns alone require that [mental health] services be provided. In addition, the effective, safe, and orderly management of correctional facilities require that these needs be met."

While sociologists have recommended trauma-focused treatments for offenders, these services are still lacking. Researchers have also noted that "there is strong empirical support for gender-specific, trauma-focused treatments". In one study, researchers offered 25 therapeutic group sessions to female inmates with mental health problems. It was found that the sessions were "successful at significantly decreasing post-traumatic stress disorder (PTSD) and substance use disorder (SUD) symptoms, with almost 50% of participants no longer meeting criteria for the disorder and 65% reporting no substance use at the 3-month follow up". Reasons for the lack of gender-specific treatment in women's prisons despite their proven use may be the difficulties of setting up such programs, including navigation of "legal and logistical barriers."

It has been found that female inmates are medicated at higher rates than their male counterparts. Women are also treated differently than men in prisons in regard to mental illness. Studies suggest "that female inmates' behaviour is more likely than males' to be 'psychiatrized' by correctional staff". One study shows that "role incongruence" effects how female and male inmates are treated. According to the study "female inmates who perpetrated acts of violence against others and/or property, or who demonstrated aggressiveness or agitation, were significantly more likely than men exhibiting similar behaviors to be placed in mental health units". Furthermore, the researchers found that men exhibiting "female psychiatric disorders (e.g., depression)" were more likely to receive mental health care than females exhibiting the same disorders. The study suggests that differential treatment of male and female inmates may be based on the inmates adherence to gender norms, and that a breaking of these norms is likely to be treated psychiatrically. Therapeutic or rehabilitation programs in prisons also differ for men and women, with male prisons providing more access to programs for anger management, and female prisons providing more access to programs addressing trauma or loss.

=== Mental health of pregnant women in prison ===
A study published in November of 2014 addresses the impact of incarceration-induced stress on pregnant women in correctional facilities. This study emphasized the heightened risk for mental health problems and adverse maternal and fetal outcomes. The study also addresses the unique challenges faced by pregnant women in correctional facilities, emphasizing the impact of incarceration induced stress on their mental health.

This study focused on pregnant women in U.S. prison system. The study found that many of them smoked, drank alcohol, and used drugs. Despite about 60% of pregnant women in U.S. prisons having a history of substance abuse, less than half of the correctional systems in the U.S. utilize programs specifically designed for these women. In North Carolina, 36% of female inmates used illegal drugs, with cocaine being the most prevalent substance. Another study reported that nine out of ten incarcerated women had substance use issues, compared to non-incarcerated pregnant women. Women in prison had higher rates of cocaine, heroin, methamphetamine, and multiple drug use. Tobacco use was common among pregnant women in prison, with prevalence rates exceeding 50% in most studies and sometimes reaching over 75%. Additionally, smoking was more prevalent among incarcerated pregnant women compared to those not in prison. Women with a history of prior incarceration were more likely to report alcohol use during pregnancy. While one study found that about 15% of pregnant incarcerated women consumed alcohol during pregnancy, another study reported a higher prevalence of 62%.

These women also often experienced abuse and have mental health problems. Being pregnant and in prison makes them even more likely to have mental health issues and use drugs. The prison conditions and lack of good medical care can make things worse for them and their babies. Recommendations suggest providing better care for pregnant women in prison and evaluating alternatives to traditional imprisonment for those with minor offenses. This could lead to better outcomes for both mental health and pregnancy.

== After prison ==
In many instances, living in prison obligates individuals to adapt socially and psychologically, making it difficult to reintegrate into daily life outside of prison and to develop healthy relationships. Furthermore, due to the prevalence of chronic diseases within jails, offenders returning to low-income communities may be inadvertently contributing to health inequities in low-income areas. The denial of human and civil rights to incarcerated individuals trying to reintegrate into society can significantly impact their mental health. The difficulties facing women upon their release from prison range from "finding housing, getting a job, earning enough money to support themselves, reconnecting with children and family." Failure to find work and a stable home may lead women back to committing crime and back to prison. The recidivism rates among prisoners is so high that it has been termed the "revolving door phenomenon." Studies have found that among women released from prison in 1994 "58% were arrested" within three and a half years of release, and "39% were returned to prison". A 2011 study by Pew Center of the States find similar recidivism rates. The release and reentry difficulties that female prisoners face are often exacerbated by mental health challenges.

The high rates of mental health problems among female offenders follows them past prison and into reentry. For women who have experienced trauma and abuse, the additional challenges of navigating reentry into society can retraumatize them, triggering symptoms of post-traumatic stress disorder (PTSD), depression, and anxiety. A study published in 2010 by the Reentry Planning for Offenders with Mental Disorders: Policy and Practice found that "of 357 women released from prison in six states, 44% reported they had been diagnosed with bipolar disorder, depression, obsessive compulsive disorder, post traumatic stress disorder, phobia, or schizophrenia." A majority, 56%, of these women, felt they were currently in need of treatment. However, studies find that mental health and substance abuse treatment is not readily available to women returning to their communities from prison. Furthermore, upon release many women often have trouble keeping up with medication they had access to in prison. These mental health problems may hinder offenders as they try to find a job and housing. Their health problems may be so severe they cannot work, they face the additional job of managing their health problem and mental illness increases the likelihood of engaging in "inappropriate behavior that provokes a law enforcement response." Constant discrimination and marginalization can affect self-worth and self-esteem, reinforcing feelings of shame and powerlessness. An individual's chance of recidivism decreases if significant change occurs to their in-prison mental health.

== See also ==
- Incarceration of women in the United States
