= Wrch1 =

G protein

RhoU (or Wrch1 or Chp2) is a small (~21 kDa) signaling G protein (more specifically a GTPase), and is a member of the Rho family of GTPases. Wrch1 was identified in 2001 as encoded by a non-canonical Wnt induced gene. RhoU/Wrch delineates with RhoV/Chp a Rho subclass related to Rac and Cdc42, which emerged in early multicellular organisms during evolution.
