= Certified correctional health professional =

A certified correctional health professional (CCHP) is a person who has met the associated certification requirements established by the National Commission on Correctional Health Care in the United States. There are additional certifications offered in the fields of mental health, nursing and medicine. There is also an advanced certification. All of these may be obtained after initial CCHP certification.

The CCHP program, which includes the passing of a written exam, recognizes health care professionals from a variety of disciplines and settings, and the credential has been awarded to thousands of individuals throughout the country. Certification demonstrates a commitment to the profession and may reduce liability in legal suits.
