= Christian Heritage Party =

Christian Heritage Party may refer to:

- Christian Heritage Party of Canada (1987–present)
  - Christian Heritage Party of British Columbia
- Christian Heritage Party of New Zealand (defunct) (1989–2006)
