= Chp (GTPase) =

G protein

RhoV (or Chp or Wrch2) is a small (~21 kDa) signaling G protein (more specifically a GTPase), and is a member of the Rho family of GTPases. Chp was identified in 1998 as a GTPase interacting with the p21 activated kinase PAK2. RhoV/Chp delineates with RhoU/Wrch a Rho subclass related to Rac and Cdc42, which emerged in early multicellular organisms during evolution. RhoV/Chp depends on palmitoylation rather than prenylation for association with plasma and intracellular membranes. In Xenopus embryos, RhoV is encoded by a canonical Wnt response gene and is induced in the developing neural crest at specification. RhoV activity cooperates with the Snai1 (Snail) transcription factor for the subsequent induction of the pro-invasive transcription factors Snai2 (Slug), Sox9 or Twist.

Further reading: Rho family of GTPases
