= Prison nursery =

For imprisoned mothers with their young children

A prison nursery is a section of a prison that houses incarcerated mothers and their very young children. Prison nurseries are not common in correctional facilities in the United States, although prior to the 1950s many states had them and they are widespread throughout the rest of the world.

== Nurseries inside the United States ==
Most prison nurseries in the United States are only open to mothers who give birth to their children while they are serving their sentence; in most states, women who give birth prior to their incarceration are not eligible, though New York is an exception. Housing an infant in a prison nursery costs approximately $24,000 per year. However, the cost can be reduced through partnerships between prisons and local nonprofits, volunteer efforts, or government grants.

As of May 2013, nine states have prison nurseries in the United States: New York, Nebraska, Washington, Ohio, Indiana, South Dakota, Illinois, West Virginia, and Wyoming.

Bedford Hills Correctional Facility for Women, a maximum security women's prison in New York, has the oldest prison nursery in the United States. The prison nursery opened in 1901. A child is permitted to stay at Bedford Hills with their mother until 1 year of age; however, there are possible exceptions if the mother's release date is within the next 6 months. Mothers at Bedford Hills must also participate in parental classes taught by qualified inmates. The prison also provides vocational services for mothers, in addition to providing comprehensive visiting services for the older children of incarcerated mothers including daily visiting hours and a special children's visiting room.

In 1994 the Nebraska Correctional Center for Women opened their prison nursery. An infant is allowed to reside with the mother in prison if the mother's release date is before the child turns 18 months. Childbirth and parenting classes are mandatory before and after the birth of an incarcerated inmate's child.

The nursery at Washington Corrections Center for Women, which opened in 1999, offers inmates with a sentence less than 3 years after her child is born the opportunity to keep her child with her in the nursery until the child is 18 months old. At this point the mother and child move to a pre-release center for the next 18 months. The prison nursery has a partnership with the Early Head Start program, which provides developmental screenings, childcare, activities for the children, healthy food, and family services. The Mothers at the Washington Corrections Center for Women can choose to have a caregiver who looks after the infant while the mother is at work.

The Ohio Reformatory for Women nursery opened in April 2001. The nursery can hold up to 20 inmates and their infants up to 18 months old. Every mother has a nanny who, like the mother, is an inmate who has taken parental classes and is serving time for a non-violent offense. The nanny is a volunteer inmate who is available at any time to care for a mother's child when the mother has made a prior commitment.

== Preungesheim ==
Preungesheim, a maximum-security women's prison in Frankfurt, Germany, has one of the best-known programs for incarcerated mothers and their children. Mothers who are on high-security and must stay on prison grounds are able to keep their children until they are around 3 years old. They live in a "closed mother-child house" that is a separate enclosed building on the prison grounds. During the day, children attend preschool while their mothers are at work. Those mothers who are not a high-security risk live in an “open mother-child house” with their children. An open mother-child house opens to the nearby neighborhood, instead of opening to the prison – distinctly setting an open mother-child house apart from a closed mother-child house. Children are allowed to play in the nearby playground during the day while their mothers are at work.

If a mother is permitted work release, and has a school-aged child living in Frankfurt, she spends the day at home taking care of her family but sleeps at the prison at night. A work-release mother is allowed to take her children to school and doctor appointments and grocery shop during the day. After she prepares dinner, she tucks her child into bed and departs back to the prison to sleep, leaving her child in the hands of a caretaker.

== Medical care for pregnant incarcerated women ==
Pregnant inmates, along with every other inmate, are required to receive proper mental and physical (medical) care while incarcerated. In 2001, the Plata vs. Schwarzenegger case stated that California prisons were violating prisoners’ Eighth Amendment rights to adequate physical and mental care and treatment. As a result, the California Department of Corrections and Rehabilitation (CDCR) was required to adopt different policies, including those concerning pregnant inmates. California Department of Corrections and Rehabilitation's Adult Institutions, Programs, and Parole Operations manual Chapter 5 Article 45: Care, Treatment, and Security of Pregnant Offenders clearly states the policies implemented for the pregnant inmates within their facilities and institutions.

Their policy listed in the manual is as follows: The California Department of Corrections and Rehabilitation (CDCR) staff shall ensure a pregnant offender is not placed in restraints by the wrists, ankles, or both during labor, including during transport, delivery, and while in recovery after giving birth, except as provided in Penal Code Section 5007.7. Health care staff shall provide medical care for the pregnant offender population. Pregnant offenders shall receive, within the second trimester of gestation, a dental examination, periodontal evaluation, and the necessary periodontal treatment in order to maintain periodontal health during the gestation period. This policy will ensure the safety of the inmate and her unborn child. It will also ensure that the inmate receives proper medical care. According to the manual, pregnant inmates will visit their doctor or OB/GYN every 4 weeks in the first trimester and up to 24–26 weeks gestation, every 3 weeks up to 30 weeks gestation, every 2 weeks up to 36 weeks and, weekly after 36 weeks up to delivery.

However, this policy does not automatically grant the mother the right to have bonding time with her infant after giving birth and does not require states to mandate postpartum counseling. Most states require the mother to give up her baby a few hours after delivery, although time spent together after differs, most states allow twenty-four hours with their infants (some allowing forty-eight).

== Arguments in favor of prison nurseries ==
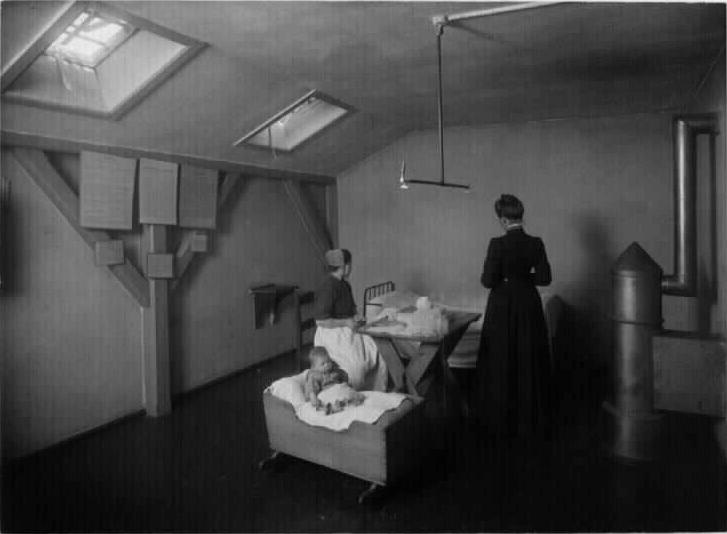
The former prison in Christianshavn, Copenhagen, Denmark, demolished 1928

The states that have taken to incorporating prison nurseries within their correctional systems have done so on the basis of an assumption that this will facilitate development of maternal bond and secure attachment by the child. The impact of maternal incarceration on many aspects of children's later lives is well demonstrated. Prison officials believe that the first two years are a crucial time period for the mother and her infant. Most facilities allow the infant to reside with her mother until he/she is 18 months old, although Washington State will keep children in prison until they are three.

Many prisons offer parenting classes, substance abuse counseling, general education, and "safe havens" for mothers and infants to be in. "Prison nurseries have the potential to promote rehabilitation of incarcerated mothers, while also providing the physical closeness and supportive environment necessary for the development of secure attachment between mothers and their infants." Instead of the opportunity to connect with their mothers, babies are placed in "foster care" which is "the ultimate placement for 10% of infants born to women in prison across the nation."

== Effects on children who were in prison nurseries ==
"Thirty percent of children who co-resided in a prison nursery and 42% of separated children had at least one problem area in the clinical range."

== Studies and evaluations of prison nursery programs ==
Joseph R. Carlson conducted the most comprehensive evaluation to date of the effects of prison nurseries on mother recidivism. The evaluation focussed on women at the Nebraska Correctional Center for Facility for Women. The study compares the recidivism rate of 30 women who participated in a prison nursery program at the Nebraska Correctional Center for Women with the recidivism rate of women who gave birth while in custody and had their babies taken away immediately after birth (these women were incarcerated at the prison before the nursery had been created). The recidivism rate for program participants was 9 percent while the recidivism rate for mothers who were immediately separated from their children was 33 percent. This study, however, like others of its kind, suffers from severe selection bias, insofar as it fails to account for the screening out of more serious offenders from the nursery program. No study to date demonstrates that prison nurseries reduce recidivism.

Mary Byrne, a Columbia University nursing professor is in the process of conducting a study of 100 children born at the prison nurseries at the Bedford Hills and Taconic Correctional Facilities in Westchester County, N.Y. in order to evaluate the impact that prison nurseries have on parent-child bonding, and healthy infant development. So far, Byrne has concluded that some children are able to form a secure attachment with their mothers when they are kept in prison with their mothers. However, most of the mothers separate from their children after release from prison, and Byrne notes that children who are separated from their initial caregivers have an increased likelihood of emotional and behavioral disorders, school failure and trouble with the law. Byrne did not study outcomes for children born to prison inmates who are immediately placed for adoption.

As previously stated many countries around the world have prison nurseries where both a mother and her child reside. A study conducted in Iran investigated the relationship between mother and child in these environments. The participants of the study consisted of 14 imprisoned mothers with their children. An interview was conducted of prisoners after they left the prison nursery. The results of the study found the presence of the child created an emotional support system for prisoners. The nursery helped prisoners deal with loneliness, anxiety, and fight depression. Mothers reported having a positive outlook for their future. They began to become hopeful to reenter society as contributing members. Mothers reported wanting to find jobs to secure their child's future. Past studies done about prison nurseries, has been found that mothers in prison nurseries had lower rates of recidivism. The mothers in the Iranian prison unit reported that parenting their child reminded them of being at home. Their daily lives consisted of their child-rearing practices. The presence of toys, noise, and interactions gave a sense of home life. The experiences of these prisoners differ from those of other units because they have members that can sympathize and support them with their experiences.

There are many positives associated with keeping a mother with her child. A previous study conducted has found that mothers in prisons nurseries have the ability to form of a secure bond. The ability to have a secure attachment is important for a child's development. However, the Iranian study revealed some of the risks for a child in that environment. Even though the mothers had separated units, the yard and recess are shared with other prisoners. Participants of the study reported that children were cursed at and pushed during these times. The study also found children can have a lack of resources in prisons environment such as bedding, clothing, and food.
