= Cricohyoidopexy =

Surgical procedure

Cricohyoidopexy (CHP) is a surgical procedure performed after partial removal of the larynx due to laryngeal cancer. It is categorized under horizontal laryngeal surgeries, alongside cricohyoidoepiglottopexy (CHEP), which particularly preserves the suprahyoid epiglottis, performed due to especially for tumors in the glottic region (where the vocal cords are located). The procedures aim to achieve oncological control while preserving essential laryngeal functions such as breathing, swallowing, and phonation.

== History ==
Cricohyoidopexy (CHP) was first described by E. Majer and W. Rieder in 1959 as a form of supracricoid partial laryngectomy. Cricohyoidoepiglottopexy (CHEP) was later described by Jean Jacques Piquet in 1974 as a modification of earlier techniques introduced by Majer and Rieder (1959) and by J. Labayle and R. Bismuth in 1971. The method was adopted in various surgical departments in the early 1980s as an alternative to total laryngectomy, particularly in patients with intermediate- to advanced-stage tumors.

== Surgical technique ==
=== Resection ===
In both CHP and CHEP, the patient is placed supine with neck extension. Orotracheal intubation and nasogastric tube placement are standard, and a tracheotomy is performed. A bilateral apron flap (Roux-Berger's bilateral incision) provides exposure and allows concurrent neck dissection.

The thyroid cartilage and vocal cords are resected, preserving the cricoid cartilage, hyoid bone, and at least one mobile arytenoid. The suprahyoid epiglottis is preserved. Resection includes the aryepiglottic folds, vestibular folds, thyroarytenoid muscles, and the cricothyroid ligament. The pharyngeal muscles and paraglottic space are dissected. The superior laryngeal nerves are spared when possible. Frozen section analysis confirms clear surgical margins.

=== Reconstruction ===
Reconstruction involves suturing the cricoid cartilage to the hyoid bone and with or without the preserved epiglottis. The base of the tongue is included to stabilize the reconstructed laryngeal structure (neolarynx). Surgical sutures (e.g., Vicryl or Dexon) are passed through the cricoid, hyoid, and epiglottis. A median double stitch and lateral stitches stabilize the neolarynx. If one arytenoid is resected, it is repositioned medially via an anterior cricoid suture. The constrictor muscles may be reattached to facilitate swallowing.

== Postoperative care ==
Postoperative care includes monitoring for bleeding, infection, and aspiration. Tracheostomy decannulation and nasogastric tube removal are guided by swallowing assessments, often using functional endoscopic evaluation (FEES). Diet is progressively advanced from gelled water to solids. A gradual approach to tracheostomy closure is generally favored.
