= N-Cyclohexyl-2-pyrrolidone =

Names
- Preferred IUPAC name 1-Cyclohexylpyrrolidin-2-one
- Other names CHP

Identifiers
CAS Number	6837-24-7
3D model (JSmol)	Interactive image; Interactive image
ChemSpider	73333
ECHA InfoCard	100.027.199
PubChem CID	81278
UNII	7IM8P1VVNM
CompTox Dashboard (EPA)	DTXSID7044716
- InChI: InChI=1S/C10H17NO/c12-10-7-4-8-11(10)9-5-2-1-3-6-9/h9H,1-8H2 Key: PZYDAVFRVJXFHS-UHFFFAOYSA-N; InChI=1/C10H17NO/c12-10-7-4-8-11(10)9-5-2-1-3-6-9/h9H,1-8H2 Key: PZYDAVFRVJXFHS-UHFFFAOYAM
- SMILES: O=C2N(C1CCCCC1)CCC2; O=C1N(C2CCCCC2)CCC1

Properties
Chemical formula	C_{10}H_{17}NO
Molar mass	167.252 g·mol^{−1}
Appearance	Colorless to yellow liquid
Density	1.007 g/cm^{3}
Melting point	12 °C (54 °F; 285 K)
Boiling point	284 °C (543 °F; 557 K)
Viscosity	11.5 cP

Hazards
- Occupational safety and health (OHS/OSH)
Main hazards	Toxic
Flash point	145 °C (293 °F; 418 K)
- Except where otherwise noted, data are given for materials in their standard state (at 25 °C [77 °F], 100 kPa). verify (what is ?) Infobox references

N-Cyclohexyl-2-pyrrolidone or CHP is a yellow to colorless liquid. It has a low vapor pressure, and is nearly odorless. It has a low solubility in water, but is soluble in a variety of organic solvents.

CHP is used in the electronics industry as a photoresist stripper (usually in combination with other solvents like N-methyl-2-pyrrolidone), and as a chemical polisher of copper in circuit board fabrication. It is also used in the textiles industry as a dye carrier in aramid fabrics.
