= National Commission on Correctional Health Care =

American non-profit organization

The National Commission on Correctional Health Care (NCCHC) is an independent, non-profit organization with the stated goal of improving the standard of care in the field of correctional health care in the United States. With support from major national organizations representing the fields of health, law and corrections, the NCCHC is committed to improving the quality of health care in jails, prisons, and juvenile confinement facilities.

NCCHC's origins date to the early 1970s, when an American Medical Association (AMA) study of jails found inadequate, disorganized health services and a lack of national standards. In collaboration with other organizations, the AMA established a program that, in the early 1980s, became the NCCHC.

NCCHC services include technical assistance and consulting through NCCHC Resources. NCCHC Resources services include correctional health system assessments, prison and jail suicide prevention programs, opioid treatment program support, health services contract monitoring, in-custody death investigations, RFP/RFQ development, crisis intervention training, and NCCHC accreditation preparation.

== Accreditation and certification ==
NCCHC offers voluntary health services accreditation program to correctional facilities. The process uses external peer reviews to determine whether correctional institutions meet national standards in their provision of health services. NCCHC also offers certification programs to individual correctional health care workers in the form of Certified Correctional Health Professional (CCHP).

NCCHC Standards include:

- Standards for Health Services in Jails
- Standards for Health Services in Prisons
- Standards for Health Services in Juvenile Detention and Confinement Facilities
- Standards for Mental Health Services in Correctional Facilities
- Standards for Opioid Treatment Programs in Correctional Facilities
