= Criminal transmission of HIV in the United States =

Intentional or reckless infection of a person with HIV

The criminal transmission of HIV in the United States varies among jurisdictions. More than thirty of the fifty U.S. states have prosecuted HIV-positive individuals for exposing another person to HIV. State laws criminalize different behaviors and assign different penalties. While pinpointing who infected whom is scientifically impossible, a person diagnosed with HIV who is accused of infecting another while engaging in sexual intercourse is, in many jurisdictions, automatically committing a crime. A person donating HIV-infected organs, tissues, and blood can be prosecuted for transmitting the virus. Spitting or transmitting HIV-infected bodily fluids is a criminal offense in some states, particularly if the target is a prison guard. Some states treat the transmission of HIV, depending upon a variety of factors, as a felony and others as a misdemeanor.

Criminal statutes were intended to reduce HIV transmission by encouraging safe sex practices, increased HIV testing, and disclosure of HIV status. The Ryan White CARE Act passed in 1990 had a significant influence on these laws, as states were required to have criminal regulations on HIV transmission to be eligible to receive federal funds for HIV-related health programs. Unfortunately, these laws did not appear to have the intended effect. In October 2012, the HIV Medicine Association (HIVMA) of the Infectious Diseases Society of America (IDSA) called for the repeal of statutes that criminalize HIV-related behavior, writing: "Policies and laws that create HIV-specific crimes or that impose penalties for persons who are HIV-infected are unjust and harmful to public health around the world." It argued that such laws contribute to stigmatization and discrimination that inhibit diagnosis and result in "harsh sentencing for behaviors that pose little to no risk of HIV transmission." It advised that "All state and federal policies, laws and regulations ... be based on scientifically accurate information regarding HIV transmission routes and risk."

In 2017 the Centers for Disease Control and Prevention (CDC) stated that those who are on HIV medication and have undetectable viral loads can no longer transmit the virus while their viral load is undetectable, but the possibility for a person to not use a prescription and continue to infect others remains. They did not specify how long after an undetectable viral load test a person can guarantee that they are still undetectable, as viral loads can rise very quickly.

== Federal law and policy ==
=== National HIV/AIDS strategy ===
In July 2010, the White House announced a major change in its HIV/AIDS policy; the "National HIV/AIDS Strategy for the United States" stated that "the continued existence and enforcement of these types of laws [that criminalize HIV infection] run counter to scientific evidence about routes of HIV transmission and may undermine the public health goals of promoting HIV screening and treatment." The administration's strategy cited a 2008 paper by Scott Burris and Edwin Cameron, a South African judge: "The use of criminal law to address HIV infection is inappropriate except in rare cases in which a person acts with conscious intent to transmit HIV and does so."

In September 2010, the Center for HIV Law and Policy launched the Positive Justice Project, a campaign to combat HIV-related stigma and discrimination against people with HIV by the US criminal justice system. In November the Project released a 293-page manual detailing HIV-specific laws and prosecutions in the 50 states, District of Columbia, U.S. Territories, Federal government, and the U.S. military.

On March 15, 2014, the U.S. Department of Justice (DOJ) along with the Centers for Disease Control published a study of HIV-specific state laws called "Prevalence and Public Health Implications of State Laws that Criminalize Potential HIV Exposure in the United States".

On July 15, 2014, the DOJ released a paper called "Best Practices Guide to Reform HIV-Specific Criminal Laws to Align with Scientifically-Supported Factors", designed to guide states in updating their statutes to "reflect contemporary understanding of HIV transmission routes and associated benefits of treatment" and to establish policies that "do not place unnecessary burdens on individuals living with HIV/AIDS".

=== Proposed federal legislation ===
REPEAL HIV Discrimination Act was the abbreviated name of the 'Repeal Existing Policies that Encourage and Allow Legal HIV Discrimination Act' (H.R. 3053), also called the REPEAL Act, proposed legislation that was introduced in the U.S. Congress on September 23, 2011, by Rep. Barbara Lee (D-CA). It called for review of all federal and state laws, policies, and regulations regarding the criminal prosecution of individuals for HIV-related offenses. It was the first piece of federal legislation to address HIV criminalization and provided incentives for states to reconsider laws and practices that target people with HIV for consensual sexual activity and conduct that poses no risk of HIV transmission. The bill had 41 cosponsors and was referred in September/October 2011 to three subcommittees, where it died.

Barbara Lee re-introduced the REPEAL HIV Discrimination Act 2013 as H.R. 1843 in May 2013 with 42 cosponsors, and it again died in three subcommittees. Senator Chris Coons introduced the legislation as S.1790 on December 10, 2013, and it did not make it out of the Judiciary Committee.

=== Immigration ===
In 2012, the Department of Homeland Security (DHS) used the conviction of Jose Luis Ramirez, an HIV-positive immigrant, of solicitation for oral sex as an argument for his deportation, calling it a "particularly serious crime". An immigration judge ordered his deportation, but the DHS withdrew its argument and the Board of Immigration Appeals (BIA) reversed the deportation order on May 31, 2013.

== State law and policy ==
=== Statutes ===
As of 2019, at least 29 states criminalize "nondisclosure, exposure or transmission" of HIV, while an additional 5 states use this to justify enhancements for sentences for other crimes. As of 2008, 33 states had laws regarding the criminalization of HIV transmission.

The following states may currently have laws that prosecute individuals for criminal exposure of HIV: Alabama, Alaska, Arkansas, California, Colorado, Delaware, Florida, Georgia, Idaho, Indiana, Iowa, Kansas, Kentucky, Louisiana, Michigan, Minnesota, Mississippi, Missouri, Montana, Nevada, New Jersey, New York, North Carolina, North Dakota, Ohio, Oklahoma, Pennsylvania, South Carolina, South Dakota, Tennessee, Texas, Utah, Virginia, and Washington.

Minnesota has a statute that criminalizes the transmission of certain communicable diseases including HIV. Under that statute, Daniel James Rick, despite having informed his sexual partner of his HIV status, was charged with attempted first-degree assault with great bodily harm. His conviction in the trial court was overturned on appeal, and the Supreme Court of Minnesota on August 21, 2013, agreed that the prosecutor had misapplied the statute's provision meant to address the transmission of a communicable disease in non-sexual contexts, such as sperm or organ donations.

Iowa Code 709c was one of the most severe criminal transmission of HIV laws in the country until its repeal 1 May 2014. For 16 years it allowed anyone with HIV exposing another person without disclosing his or her positive status, whether infection occurred or not, to be convicted of a class B felony, i.e. up to 25 years in prison and mandated registration as a sex offender. It has been called "draconian". According to the Iowa Department of Public Health, Iowa ranked second in prosecutions behind Tennessee of persons with HIV, despite having a relatively small number of persons living with HIV/AIDS. Efforts to modernize had been underway since at least 2009, led by Community HIV/Hepatitis Advocates of Iowa Network (CHAIN) and 12 other Iowa medical professional, public health, civil rights and stakeholder organizations. Senate File 2297 redefined crimes for transmission of HIV, as well as hepatitis, tuberculosis and meningococcal disease and introduced a tiered-system of sentencing: Intentional transmission remains a class B felony, but if there is intent and no transmission it is a class D felony. Exposing an individual due to reckless disregard without intent to transmit is also a class D felony. It also includes defense in court, if following a treatment regimen and physician’s advice, and no longer requires sex offender registration. On 27 February 2014, SF2297 passed the Iowa Senate by a 48-0 margin attracting national media attention. The House Judiciary passed an amended version on March 13, 2014 reintroducing "too much of the existing law". Senate File 2297 remained on the House’s list of unfinished business and was passed after going virtually unmentioned just in time before the legislature's adjournment in the early hours of 1 May 2014. Its passage repealed 709C and codified its replacement 709D.

There are also a variety of state laws regarding perinatal HIV testing of the mother and/or newborn during and following birth.

=== Prosecutions ===
Prosecutions have included:

- Thomas Guerra, who became the first person in the state of California to be convicted for intentionally infecting another individual with HIV. In court, prosecutors presented 11,000 text messages and 36 audio clips to support their case against Guerra. Since then, Guerra has been accused of intentionally exposing dozens of other men to the HIV.
- Nick Rhoades, an HIV-positive man living in Iowa, who had an undetectable viral load, was sentenced to 25 years after a single sexual encounter during which he used a condom but did not disclose his HIV status (Rhoades v. State of Iowa). In 2014, the Iowa Supreme Court reversed the sentence, recognizing the evolving understanding of HIV transmission.
- Philippe Padieu infected several women over the course of two decades. Due to medical privacy laws it was difficult to get his medical records. Prosecutors also had a hard time getting victims to testify. Padieu was convicted in Texas in May 2009 of six counts of aggravated assault with a deadly weapon and sentenced to 45 years in prison. Padieu maintains that his prosecution was unfair and that he is the real victim. His appeals have all been denied.
- An HIV-positive man was sentenced to 10 years in prison for aggravated assault after biting a police officer. His saliva was considered to be the dangerous instrument for the purpose of the "aggravated" portion of the charge (People v. Plunkett, New York Court of Appeals). However the sentence was later vacated by the Court of Appeals.
- A man in Oregon was convicted of ten counts of attempted murder and ten counts of attempted assault based on allegations that he engaged in unprotected sexual intercourse without disclosing his medical condition (State of Oregon v. Hinkhouse).
- An HIV-positive 25-year-old serving in the U.S. Army, was ordered in November 2006 to inform any sexual partner of his HIV status. After he had sex with a 17-year-old male who became infected, he was charged in June 2007 with "crimes against nature, assault and assault with a deadly weapon". He pleaded guilty in November to 3 counts of "aggravated assault by means likely to cause grievous bodily harm or death" and other charges. He was sentenced to serve 40 months in military prison, a reduction in rank to private, and a dishonorable discharge.
- An HIV-positive U.S. Navy officer and Catholic priest pleaded guilty in December 2007 to several crimes committed against U.S. Naval Academy midshipmen he was counseling, including forcible sodomy and indecent assault. Charges of assault were changed to aggravated assault because of his HIV status.
- An Air Force sergeant was apprehended in 2010 for allegedly having unprotected sex at parties while knowing he was HIV-positive. He was convicted of aggravated assault, but the conviction was overturned in 2015 by the U.S. Court of Appeals for the Armed Forces.

The Center for HIV Law and Policy has documented 168 cases of prosecution between January 2008 and June 2013.

== See also ==
- Criminal transmission of HIV
- Presidential Advisory Council on HIV/AIDS
- Nushawn Williams, a man who was prosecuted for criminal transmission of HIV
- Prison rape in the United States § Sexually transmitted infections
- HIV/AIDS in American prisons
- The Center for HIV Law and Policy
