= Center for HIV Law and Policy =

Strategy center in the United States

The Center for HIV Law and Policy (CHLP) is a national legal and policy resource and strategy center in the United States working to reduce the impact of HIV on vulnerable and marginalized communities and to secure the human rights of people affected by HIV. CHLP's founder and executive director is Catherine Hanssens.

== Work ==
CHLP is the organizational home of the Positive Justice Project (PJP), a national coalition of organizations and individuals in the United States working to end HIV criminalization. PJP released the first national statement against HIV criminalization, and this statement has been endorsed by organizations and individuals across the country. Over the last few years, there has been a growing movement to end the use of criminal laws that target persons with HIV, and even the United States federal government is taking a closer look at this issue.

Another CHLP initiative, Teen SENSE, works to secure the right of youth in state custody to comprehensive, LGBTQ-inclusive sexual health care and sexual health literacy programs.

CHLP is known for its HIV Policy Resource Bank, a free, public, online collection of research, reports and other HIV-related materials. The HIV Policy Resource Bank also includes publications from the Center for HIV Law and Policy, such as "When Sex is a Crime and Spit is a Dangerous Weapon", mapping HIV criminalization in the United States.

In May 2014, the Center for Gender and Sexuality Law at Columbia Law School published a report co-authored by the Center for HIV Law and Policy, the Center for American Progress and Streetwise & Safe called "Roadmap for Change: Federal Policy Recommendations for Addressing the Criminalization of LGBT People and People Living with HIV."

== THE REPEAL HIV Discrimination Act ==
The REPEAL HIV Discrimination Act was the abbreviated name of the 'Repeal Existing Policies that Encourage and Allow Legal HIV Discrimination Act' (H.R. 3053), also called the REPEAL Act, proposed legislation that was introduced in the U.S. Congress on September 23, 2011, by Rep. Barbara Lee (D-CA). It called for review of all federal and state laws, policies, and regulations regarding the criminal prosecution of individuals for HIV-related offenses. It was the first piece of federal legislation to address HIV criminalization and provided incentives for states to reconsider laws and practices that target people with HIV for consensual sexual activity and conduct that poses no risk of HIV transmission. The bill had 41 cosponsors and was referred in September/October 2011 to three subcommittees, where it died.

Barbara Lee re-introduced the REPEAL HIV Discrimination Act 2013 as H.R. 1843 in May 2013 with 42 cosponsors, and it again died in three subcommittees. Senator Chris Coons introduced the legislation as S.1790 on December 10, 2013, and it did not make it out of the Judiciary Committee.

== See also ==
- Criminal transmission of HIV
- Criminal transmission of HIV in the United States
- Presidential Advisory Council on HIV/AIDS
- Nushawn Williams
- Infectious diseases within American prisons#HIV/AIDS
