= Criminal transmission of HIV =

Intentional or reckless infection of a person with the human immunodeficiency virus

Criminal transmission of HIV is the intentional or reckless infection of a person with the human immunodeficiency virus (HIV). This is often conflated, in laws and in discussion, with criminal exposure to HIV, which does not require the transmission of the virus and often, as in the cases of spitting and biting, does not include a realistic means of transmission. Some countries or jurisdictions, including some areas of the U.S., have enacted laws expressly to criminalize HIV transmission or exposure, charging those accused with criminal transmission of HIV. Other countries charge the accused under existing laws with such crimes as murder, manslaughter, attempted murder, assault or fraud.

Criminal transmission of HIV is now better known as HIV non-disclosure, which is the criminal offence in some jurisdictions for not disclosing an HIV positive status. This can be intentionally or unknowingly not disclosing HIV status and then exposing or transmitting HIV to a person. HIV non-disclosure includes intentional transmission, accidental transmission, unknowing transmission (where the source individual is unaware of their infection), and exposure to HIV with no transmission. Individuals have been accused of and charged for HIV non-disclosure even if no harm was intended and if HIV was not actually transmitted. Laws in some countries also criminalize mother-to-child transmission of HIV during pregnancy/birth or breastfeeding.

== Modes of transmission ==
HIV is spread when blood, semen, pre-seminal fluid, breast milk, rectal fluids, or vaginal fluids of an HIV-positive person come into contact with a mucous membrane or bloodstream of an HIV-negative person. HIV transmission can occur via:

- Unprotected sexual intercourse
- Sharing needles or other equipment in injection drug use
- Intentionally attacking people with HIV infected needles
- Mother-to-child during pregnancy, childbirth, or breastfeeding
- Receiving a blood transfusion or organ donation – although this is unlikely because blood and organ donations are extensively tested for HIV

=== Reducing chance of transmission ===
Having a low viral load decreases the chance of transmitting HIV. A person living with HIV who is taking effective antiretroviral therapy will have a viral load that becomes so low, it is undetectable (less than 50 copies of virus per milliliter). Undetectable viral loads are untransmittable. Proper use of external condoms or internal condoms also greatly reduces any chance of transmission. The correct use of PrEP (pre-exposure prophylaxis) can dramatically reduce the chances of transmission for both sexual contact and intravenous drug users.

== Legal situation ==
In many English-speaking countries and in most of the states who have signed the European Convention of Human Rights, knowingly infecting others with HIV can lead to criminal prosecution. One such case is that of Thomas Guerra, an American landscape architect, who became the first person in the state of California to be convicted for intentionally infecting another individual with HIV. In court, prosecutors presented 11,000 text messages and 36 audio clips to support their case against Guerra. Since then, Guerra has been accused of intentionally exposing dozens of other men to HIV.

In a 2004 survey of the latter group, the Global Network of People Living with HIV/AIDS found that at least one prosecution had occurred in about half of these countries, and that in Finland, Sweden and Slovakia, about 0.5% to 1% of all people reported to be living with HIV/AIDS had been prosecuted for alleged intentional or "negligent" transmission of HIV. In many developing countries such as Thailand where the HIV/AIDS pandemic has been much more serious, laws regarding criminalisation of intentional transmission have been either weak or non-existent.

From a global perspective, the U.S. and Canada account for the vast majority of reported prosecutions.

=== Australia ===
In Australia the regulations concerned with the transmission of HIV are found in two sources, the Public Healths Acts and in the criminal law.

==== New South Wales ====
The New South Wales (NSW) Public Health Act from 2010 regulates under section 79 that a person with HIV must disclose their status to all sexual partners. Under section 79(3) it is a defence, if the court is satisfied, that the defendant took reasonable precautions to prevent the transmission. In other Australian states, there is no specific legislative requirement to disclose.

Interventions may range from counseling through to restrictive orders, with detention as a last resort. If talking about the problems of practising safe sex does not help, the doctor may obtain a Public Health Order to manage the behaviour of the HIV positive person. Only a small number of sex workers and clients have received a Public Health Order or 'management' intervention for potentially breaking the law.

Under the criminal law, a person with HIV is criminally liable for prosecution if they have intentionally transmitted the virus to their partner without informing them of their status. In NSW the relevant offences are separated into those done intentionally (s. 33 of the Crimes Act 1900), and those done recklessly (s. 35). The definition of grievous bodily harm (GBH) now explicitly includes (in ss. 4(1)(c)) 'any grievous bodily disease'. This means that the infliction of grievous bodily harm refers to causing a person to contract a grievous bodily disease. Under section 33 a person who intends to inflict grievous bodily harm on another person can be imprisoned for up to 25 years while under section 35 a person who recklessly causes another person grievous bodily harm can be imprisoned for up to 10 years and 14 years if in company. This can include causing someone to be infected with HIV. A person is generally deemed as reckless when they are aware that there is a risk that another person may be caused as a result of their actions, but they proceed to act anyway.

=== Canada ===
Though the Canadian criminal code does not contain any HIV-specific offences, undisclosed HIV transmission and exposure have been prosecuted as aggravated assault, aggravated sexual assault and other offences.

==== Current law and policy ====
Commonly referred to as "HIV non-disclosure", criminal transmission of HIV in Canada is defined as a "realistic possibility of transmission" of HIV during sexual intercourse. The Supreme Court of Canada defined "no realistic possibility of transmission" as (1) using a condom and (2) having a low or undetectable viral load. However, the threshold for a low viral load was not defined until 2017 when the Criminal Justice System's Response to Non-Disclosure of HIV made conclusions about the current laws on HIV non-disclosure including that people with low viral loads (under 200 copies of HIV per milliliter of blood) should not be convicted under the criminal law.

In 2019, the House of Commons Standing Committee on Justice and Human Rights released a report on the criminalization of HIV non-disclosure in Canada with four recommendations for the House of Commons and the Canadian Government. The committee recommended that a new law be created specifically for the transmission of HIV, instead of relying on pre-existing laws such as sexual assault. They recommended that this law be applicable only when HIV is actually transmitted and "HIV non-disclosure should never be prosecuted if (1) the infected individual has an undetectable viral load (less than 200 copies per millilitre of blood); (2) condoms are used; (3) the infected individual's partner is on PrEP or (4) the type of sexual act (such as oral sex) is one where there is a negligible risk of transmission." This allows for four different scenarios in which HIV positive people will not have to disclose their status because of the nature of the sexual encounter; current laws only allow for one specific scenario with multiple requirements.

HIV researchers have criticized the recommendations for not going far enough to counteract the adverse effects that the current law imposes on women. Although people living with HIV are generally aware of non-disclosure laws, many do not fully understand the law or understand when they do or do not have to disclose their status.

==== History ====
The first notable case of HIV non-disclosure is R. v Cuerrier, where the defendant was charged with aggravated assault and sexual transmission of HIV under section 268 of the Criminal Code. The Supreme Court found that the trial judge had misdirected himself and ordered a new trial on two counts of aggravated assault but in May 1999, the British Columbian Attorney-General announced that a new trial would not take place. The Court's ruling caused difficulty because even though it only concerned non-disclosure of HIV-positive status in sexual situations, it unanimously rejected the English authority of R. v Clarence, with L'Heureux-Dubé stating that any fraud could vitiate consent to all types of assault because the autonomy and physical integrity of the person has been violated. Thus, because the Canadian legislature has declined to criminalize the transmission of HIV, the judiciary must address the issues as and when they arise.

R. v Mabior is the Supreme Court of Canada's most recent decision outlining criminal liability for serostatus nondisclosure. After being diagnosed with HIV in 2004, Clato Mabior underwent aggressive antiretroviral therapy and was adhering to treatment at the time of pursuing sexual relations with multiple partners between 2004 and 2006. Despite intermittent condom use, HIV was never transmitted to his partners. Ultimately, the Court convicted Mabior with six counts of aggravated sexual assault.

Subsequent legal precedent has established that failure to disclose HIV-positive status, combined with failure to utilize protective measures (condom use), is sufficiently fraudulent behaviour to constitute turning "consensual" sex into aggravated sexual assault, since the other party has been denied the information necessary to give properly informed consent. The Court's vague justification for serostatus disclosure under circumstances that lead to "significant risk of bodily harm" remained a particularly contentious issue in the aftermath of Cuerrier. Because Cuerrier did not expressly define "significant risk", lower courts inconsistently criminalized HIV-positive defendants based on varied interpretations of the clause. In large part, Mabior represents a response to Cuerrier and an attempt to sharpen the criteria. In Mabior, the Court found that "significant risk of bodily harm is negated if (i) the accused's viral load at the time of sexual relations was low or undetectable, and (ii) condom protection was used."

On 1 December 2005, Jian Ghomeshi filed a report on this issue for the CBC. He asked whether there is a legal obligation to disclose HIV status. He held up the case of Johnson Aziga, who was diagnosed in 1996 but then allegedly had unprotected sex with at least 13 women. Aziga was charged with two counts of murder and 11 counts of aggravated sexual assault; the prosecution claims that he did not disclose his status. In 2009, Aziga was found guilty of the 2 counts of first-degree murder, 10 counts of aggravated sexual assault and 1 count of attempted aggravated sexual assault.

Several Canadian courts had ruled that people who are not informed that a sexual partner is HIV-positive cannot truly give consent to sex. As a result, the death of Aziga's partners was automatically considered to be murder instead of the lesser charge of manslaughter. However, in Mabior the Supreme Court rejected the view that consent will always be vitiated by non-disclosure of HIV-positive status, substituting the rule that there will be no consent only if in addition to the non-disclosure there was a realistic possibility of transmission of HIV.

=== Colombia ===
The first known case of criminal HIV infection in Colombia was that of Luis Ernesto Arrázola who, despite having a confirmed diagnosis for HIV since 1989, frequented a blood donation center in Bogotá and donated blood 12 different times resulting in the death of 14 individuals who had received blood transfusions at the hospital Clinica Palermo in Bogotá.

The case received public notoriety in 1992 after a two-year-old girl was confirmed to have had a positive diagnosis for HIV despite, at the time, not having a scientific or medical explanation. The two-year-old girl died in the same year of her diagnosis, however, it was not until the following year, in 1993, that the Office of the Attorney General of Colombia started to investigate the case after the father of the girl made an official report against the hospital where her daughter was being treated. The General Attorney's office determined that the crime involved the laboratory that provided blood for the hospital, which failed to test the blood for HIV, and the individual who donated blood despite having the positive diagnosis for the virus.

The General Attorney's office brought charges against Luis Ernesto Arrázola, Jorge Alvarado Domínguez who was the owner of the laboratory where Arrázola donated blood and against Nun Alicia Eslava Blanco then director of the hospital of the clinic, after determining that at least 14 individuals had contracted HIV/AIDS from the contaminated blood.

The General Attorney's office found that Jorge Alvarado Domínguez, who was also a bacteriologist, had accepted the blood donation of Arrázola and of another individual who was also positive for HIV. Jorge Alvarado provided the samples with the National Quality Seal for Blood and provided them to the hospital.

On 15 March 1995, the Superior Court of Bogotá sentenced both Arrázola and Alvarado to eleven years and six months of prison in penitentiary confinement for intentional homicide and failing to prevent the spread of an epidemic. While the hospital, nor Nun Alicia Eslava Blanco, were not found criminally liable for the affair, they were subject to indemnization lawsuits from the surviving families.

=== Finland ===
The first case of criminal HIV infection in Finland was that of Steven Thomas, a US citizen from New York, who was convicted in 1997 in Helsinki for knowingly infecting Finnish women with HIV during 1993–1996. In January 1997, Finnish police published Thomas' picture in newspapers and stated that Thomas may have infected tens or even hundreds of Finnish women with HIV. Seventeen women said they had been in unprotected sexual contact with Thomas.

Thomas was given a 14-year prison sentence at the Helsinki court on 10 July 1997 for 17 counts of attempted manslaughter. Thomas was found to have infected 5 of the 17 women with HIV, and was ordered to pay damages of $63,000–$73,000 to each infected victim. The sentence was widely criticised within the legal system, because under Finnish law the maximum sentence for multiple counts of attempted manslaughter is 12 years. Lauri Lehtimaja, the Ombudsman of the Parliament, gave a warning to the court judge about his misuse of the law. The Helsinki Court of Appeal lowered the sentence in December 1997 to be 11 years and 6 months of imprisonment. The documents of the case were classified for 40 years.

In 2002 Steven Thomas was quietly released and deported from Finland to an unknown location.

A Finnish man convicted of spreading HIV knowingly through unprotected sex with many women was Aki Matti Hakkarainen. He was first convicted in 2005 and sentenced to one year and nine months in prison for attempted aggravated assault. In August 2007, Hakkarainen was arrested by Rovaniemi police after a report from a young woman saying she had contracted HIV from Hakkarainen during unprotected sex. On 5 October 2007, police published the name and photo of Hakkarainen in newspapers in an effort to reach all women who had had sexual intercourse with him.

In court, Hakkarainen admitted to having unprotected sex with the women but denied trying to infect them with the virus. On 22 April 2008, Rovaniemi court concluded that Hakkarainen knowingly infected five women with HIV, and in August 2008 he was found guilty of five counts of aggravated assault and 14 counts of attempted aggravated assault. He was sentenced to ten years in prison. He was also ordered to pay 45,000–55,000 euros compensation to the five women that contracted the virus.

=== Germany ===
In the Federal Republic of Germany on 16 August 2010, Nadja Benaissa of the German pop music group No Angels admitted to sex with several men while knowing her HIV-positive status, and infecting one of those several, who subsequently brought the case against her. She faced prison, but was instead given probation (two years) and community service. Women groups were outraged at the possibility of a woman being charged for negligently spreading HIV. She denied any intent to infect, apologising profusely and saying "When I was arrested I realised that the way that I had dealt with the illness had been wrong... I made a big mistake... No way did I want my partner to be[come] infected." She stated that she concealed the infection to avoid hurting the success of her band. Benaissa has claimed she had been told by doctors that the risk of passing on the virus was "practically zero".

=== Ireland ===
In 1995, Catholic priest Michael Kennedy alleged in his Sunday sermon in Dungarvan that a woman from London had deliberately infected numerous local men with HIV. While the consensus was that Kennedy was propagating an urban myth, the legal implications of such behaviour were debated. The first conviction in Ireland for reckless HIV transmission via sex was in the District Court in 2018, for a man who had unprotected sex in 2009–10 with two women without informing them of his HIV status. He had neglected to take prescribed anti-retroviral medication after a 2008 diagnosis of HIV subtype B, the same strain the two women were diagnosed with in 2010. He was sentenced to 10 years' imprisonment under s.4 of the Non-Fatal Offences Against the Person Act 1997 for "intentionally or recklessly caus[ing] serious harm to another". His sentence was overturned by the Supreme Court in 2023, on the basis that circumstantial evidence from the women and medical professionals should have been addressed with greater care "to establish there was no reasonable possibility that either of the women could have been infected another way". Both women had initially told investigators they had no other sexual partners, but later said they had other partners but always used condoms with them.

In the 1980s and 1990s contamination of haemophilia blood products and of anti-D led to hundreds of HIV infections. Tribunals of inquiry criticised decisions by the Blood Transfusion Service Board and National Haemophilia Treatment Centre, but no criminal charges were made.

The Non-Fatal Offences Against the Person Act 1997 addressed an increase in syringe attack muggings and abandoned used syringes by creating offences of attacking or threatening with (s. 6), possession with intent (s. 7), and placing or abandoning (s. 8) a syringe or container of blood. It is an aggravating factor for an attacker to assert the syringe has HIV-positive blood; the victim need not perceive a risk of infection. If there is actual transmission of blood or fluid contaminated with a "potentially life threatening disease", the penalty is life imprisonment.

=== Libya ===
The HIV trial in Libya, also called 'the Bulgarian nurses affair', concerns the trials, appeals and eventual release of six foreign medical workers charged with conspiring to deliberately infect over 400 children with HIV in 1998, causing an epidemic at El-Fatih Children's Hospital in Benghazi, Libya.

The defendants, arrested in 1999, were one Palestinian medical intern and five Bulgarian nurses (often termed "medics"). All of the medics were heavily tortured for months to extract confessions. The torture process is described in details in the book Notes from Hell, co-written by Nikolay Yordanov and one of the nurses, Valya Chervianashka. As a result, three of the medics signed confessions. They were first sentenced to death, had their case remanded by Libya's highest court, and were sentenced to death again, which was upheld by Libya's highest court in early July 2007.

A Libyan government panel later commuted their sentences to life in prison. The six were released following a deal reached with European Union representatives on humanitarian issues. The EU did not condone the guilty verdict in Libya against the six.

On 24 July 2007, the five medics and the doctor were extradited to Bulgaria, where their sentences were commuted by the Bulgarian President Georgi Parvanov and they were freed. Libya has since complained about the releases, and the issue remains ongoing. Furthermore, a controversy has arisen concerning the terms of release, which allegedly include an arms trade as well as a civilian nuclear cooperation agreement signed by French President Nicolas Sarkozy in July 2007.

=== New Zealand ===
On 6 October 2005 a New Zealand District Court ruled that HIV-positive people need not tell sexual partners about their status so long as safe sex is practiced. In the case being ruled on, the man had used a condom during intercourse but not during oral sex. His partner had not been infected. The same man was convicted of criminal nuisance earlier for having unprotected sex with another partner without revealing his HIV status.

In May 2009, a 40-year-old bisexual man from Auckland was thought to have infected at least five younger gay men between 2008 and 2009. One of the infected men had laid a formal complaint to the New Zealand police, sex venues shut their doors to what was called a 'HIV predator' and police arrested the 40-year-old man on 28 May 2009. On 16 June 2009 the court heard that two more people had come forward with complaints bringing the total to six. The eight charges included that he "with reckless disregard for the safety of others caused – or attempted to cause – grievous bodily harm to five males aged 17, 20, 24, 26, and 31, plus a female aged 19." He faced charges of "willfully and without justification or excuse causing in a male aged 20 and a female aged 19 a disease, namely HIV." The trial set for 2010 did not proceed as Glenn Mills, accused of knowingly exposing fourteen young people to HIV, was found dead in his Mt Eden remand prison cell on 30 November 2009 after having made two unsuccessful applications to be released on bail in prior weeks.

=== Netherlands ===
Three HIV-positive men, Peter Mulder, Hans Jurgens and Wim Dekker, were jailed in 2008 on charges of attempting to inflict grievous bodily harm after drugging and raping 14 men, some of whom they injected with their own HIV-infected blood. Twelve of the victims were HIV-positive or suffering from AIDS at the time of the trial.

=== Poland ===
In Poland under Art. 161 of the Criminal Code, persons who knowingly risk infecting others with HIV are liable to be jailed from 3 months to 5 years. With multiple victims the sentence can be as long as 10 years.

=== Russia ===
Infecting another individual with HIV is a criminal offense unless that individual knew about HIV infection beforehand and consented.

=== United Kingdom ===
Transmission generally may fall under sections 18, 20, 23, 24 or 47 of the Offences against the Person Act 1861 (respectively grievous bodily harm (GBH) with intent or to resist arrest, GBH generally, poisoning (two sections), and actual bodily harm).

As of 19 June 2006, there had been seven convictions for the sexual transmission of HIV in England and Wales under s.20 of the 1861 Act which, inter alia, criminalizes the reckless inflicting of grievous bodily harm. Of these, five were men accused of infecting female partners during sex, one was a man who pleaded guilty to infecting a male partner, and one (in Wales) was a woman. In 2005, the 20-year-old Welsh woman was convicted of infecting her boyfriend with HIV during sex, knowing she had the infection. In 2006, a 43-year-old woman pleaded guilty to recklessly inflicting grievous bodily harm on her 31-year-old lover.

Only two cases pleaded 'not guilty', and both have gone to appeal. In R. v Dica the Court of Appeal held that a person was reckless if, knowing that they were HIV-positive, they transmitted HIV to a person who had not been told of the infection, and convicted him of a total sentence of 8 years' imprisonment. It was not necessary to prove that the transmission had involved an assault for the "inflicting" of the disease. They acknowledged that there could be a higher standard of disclosure expected of someone in a relationship, compared with the "known risks" involved in casual sex. Matthew Weait has critically discussed the case.

In R. v Konzani the same court held that a person accused of recklessly transmitting HIV could only raise the defense of consent, in cases where that consent was a "willing" or "conscious" consent. In other words, the court distinguished between "willingly running the risk of transmission" and "willingly consenting to the risk of transmission". This suggests that consent will only operate as a defense—in all but the most exceptional of cases—where there has already been prior disclosure of known HIV-positive status.

As of June 2006, two women have been convicted for passing on an HIV infection in the UK. The first, from Cardiff, was jailed for 2 years; the second, Sarah Jane Porter, was convicted of grievous bodily harm through the reckless transmission of HIV, and was sentenced to 32 months in prison in June 2006.

The National AIDS Trust has published a table of cases of people in England and Wales charged with reckless sexual transmission of HIV.

In November 2017, a man called Daryll Rowe was convicted of grievous bodily harm after intentionally infecting five men with the virus and attempting to infect five more. The Rowe case has been reported as being the first case in the United Kingdom where the defendant was found guilty for intentionally rather than recklessly transmitting the virus. In 2017, another man, Antonio Reyes-Minana, was convicted of grievous bodily harm after withholding his HIV status from two male partners.

An important issue that arises where proof of transmission is required is establishing the source of the complainant's HIV infection. Although it cannot prove the route and timing of transmission, phylogenetic analysis has been used in many trials to demonstrate how closely related HIV strains in samples taken from the defendant and complainant are. The issues and problems surrounding phylogenetic analysis in criminal investigation are discussed in a 2007 report by aidsmap.

Presentations from the Economic and Social Research Council funded 2011 seminar series "HIV/AIDS and Law: Theory, Practice and Policy" at Keele University deal with the question of criminalization.

==== Scotland ====
In February 2001 Stephen Kelly, an ex-prisoner and former IV drug user, was convicted of the Scots common law offence of "recklessly injuring" his former partner by infecting her with HIV. In HMA v Deveraux (2010), the HIV positive defendant pleaded guilty to reckless injury on four counts, one of which led to the victim contracting HIV.

=== United States ===
Criminal statutes against transmission of HIV exist primarily at the state level. These were significantly influenced by the passage of the Ryan White CARE Act which predicated federal funding for state AIDS treatment programs on states having said statutes in place.

In July 2010 the White House announced a major change in its HIV/AIDS policy, a change informed by public health law research carried out by Scott Burris, professor of law at Temple University and the director of its Public Health Law Research program. The Obama administration's National HIV/AIDS Strategy for the United States concluded that "the continued existence and enforcement of these types of laws [that criminalize HIV infection] run counter to scientific evidence about routes of HIV transmission and may undermine the public health goals of promoting HIV screening and treatment."

In the fall of 2010, the Center for HIV Law and Policy launched the 'Positive Justice Project', a campaign to combat HIV-related stigma and discrimination against people with HIV by the U.S. criminal justice system. It released a manual of HIV-specific laws and prosecutions in the 50 states, District of Columbia, U.S. territories, federal government, and military in 2010.

On 23 September 2011, Rep. Barbara Lee (D-CA) introduced H.R. 3053, The Repeal Existing Policies that Encourage and Allow Legal HIV Discrimination Act or the REPEAL HIV Discrimination Act. The REPEAL HIV Discrimination Act calls for review of all federal and state laws, policies, and regulations regarding the criminal prosecution of individuals for HIV-related offenses. The bill died in the Subcommittee on Health, and also in 2013/2014 when introduced as H.R. 1843 and referred to the Subcommittee on Military Personnel.

Courts have looked into the statistical probability of HIV transmission to overturn or reduce criminal sentences resulting from prosecutions. For example, on 23 February 2015, the United States Court of Appeals for the Armed Forces reversed the aggravated assault conviction of Technical Sergeant David Gutierrez upon determining, that the risk of HIV transmission through sexual intercourse was not "likely to produce death or grievous bodily harm" under the applicable statute.

As of 2017, the Centers for Disease Control and Prevention (CDC) states that those who have undetectable levels of HIV in their blood cannot transmit the virus, but only when they are compliant with treatment.

== Criticism of criminal statutes ==
Research has been done on the effects of the criminalization of HIV non-disclosure. It has been demonstrated that these types of laws increase HIV stigma and negatively affect public health. HIV non-disclosure laws and criminalization of HIV transmission may make people less likely to access HIV testing and less likely to disclosure their status or discuss sexual health with a healthcare provider. They may also be applied unevenly. For example, in Canada, although women only make up 10% of Canadian non-disclosure prosecutions, there is an overrepresentation of prosecuted sex workers, Indigenous women, and abuse survivors. There is also a higher proportion of women and Indigenous people involved in cases based on low levels of blameworthiness (e.g., difficult life circumstance, spontaneous sexual acts, compliance with authorities, condom use, and evidence that the accused was abused by the complainant).

South Africa's openly HIV-positive Supreme Court Justice Edwin Cameron argued against criminalisation at the XVII International AIDS Conference in Mexico City.

== See also ==
- Serophobia
- STD notifications in dating services
- Electronic health record (EHR)
- Criminal transmission of HIV by various people
- Undetectable=Untransmittable
- Intentional contagion of infection
