= ADAP Advocacy =

American non-profit organization

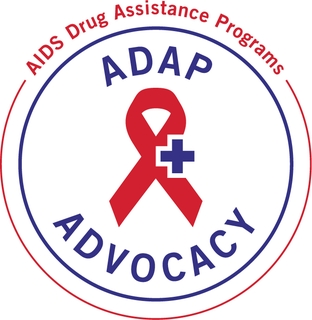
- ADAP Advocacy logo
- Formation: July 6, 2007; 18 years ago
- Founders: Gary Rose; John D. Kemp, Esq. Joyce Turner Keller; Michelle Anderson; Philip A. Haddad, MD; Rani G. Whitfield, MD; William E. Arnold
- Founded at: Washington, D.C.
- Type: 501(c)(3) Nonprofit Organization
- Tax ID no.: 26-0482120
- Legal status: Charity
- Purpose: Promote and enhance the AIDS Drug Assistance Programs (ADAPs); Improve access to care for Persons Living With HIV/AIDS (PLWHA)
- Headquarters: Nags Head, NC
- Region served: United States; U.S. Territories
- Products: ADAP Blog; ADAP Directory
- CEO: Brandon M. Macsata
- Board of directors: Guy Anthony; Wanda Brendle-Moss, RN; Erin Darling, Esq; Robert "Bobby" Dorsey, Esq. Lyne Fortin, B.Pharm, MBA; Lisa Johnson-Lett; Brandon M. Macsata; Shabbir Imber Safdar; Jennifer Vaughan; Marcus A. Wilson
- Website: adapadvocacy.org
- Formerly called: ADAP Advocacy Association

ADAP Advocacy is an American national 501(c)(3) non-profit organization based in Washington, D.C., that is dedicated to promoting and enhancing the AIDS Drug Assistance Programs (ADAPs) and improving access to care and treatment for Persons Living with HIV/AIDS (PLWHA) in the United States and the U.S. Territories.

== History ==
ADAP Advocacy (formerly the ADAP Advocacy Association, or aaa+) began as an organizing committee in 2007 composed of advocates, community leaders, students, medical specialists, and ADAP recipients in response to the then long-standing waiting list crisis facing the Ryan White HIV/AIDS Program (RWHAP), commonly known as the ADAP Crisis. The ADAP Crisis resulted in tens of thousands of Persons Living with HIV/AIDS (PLWHA) being unable to access medications to treat their HIV across the United States, peaking in September 2011 with 9,298 individuals on ADAP waiting lists.

Throughout most of the 2000s and early 2010s, state ADAPs were forced to place financially eligible PLWHA on waiting lists to receive financial assistance to afford medications to treat HIV. These waiting lists were primarily the result of insufficient federal funding to keep up with the demand for ADAP services by new potential patients through the congressional appropriations process through which state ADAPs are funded.

ADAP Advocacy, in collaboration with the AIDS Healthcare Foundation, Community Access National Network (CANN), and Housing Works, pushed the introduction of federal legislation to re-appropriate funding to State AIDS Drug Assistance Programs. The legislation, S.3401, introduced by former Senator Richard Burr, proposed using unobligated Stimulus dollars to address AIDS Drug Assistance Program waiting lists and other cost containment measures impacting people living with HIV/AIDS.

The organization hosted an Emergency Summit in Florida, which was the epicenter of the beginning of the ADAP Crisis, culminating in advocates sending a letter to then President Barack Obama demanding action. The Summit also paved the way for significant concessions from industry partners to help alleviate fiscal pressures on ADAPs.

During the ADAP Crisis that landed thousands of PLWHA living in the United States across 13 states on ADAP waiting lists for their life-saving medications, ADAP Advocacy published a Congressional Scorecard evaluating Members of Congress on their commitment to fighting HIV/AIDS. The scorecard was discontinued in 2014.

== ADAP Directory ==
On August 14, 2014, ADAP Advocacy announced the launch of the AIDS Drug Assistance Program Directory (a.k.a. the ADAP Directory), a website that allows users to find information about each of the 60 state and territorial ADAPs, including:

- Eligibility criteria;
- Application instructions;
- Full-Pay formulary coverage;
- If the program covers curative Hepatitis C Direct-Acting Antivirals;
- If the program covers newer long-acting injectable antiretroviral medications, and;
- Contact information for each program

== Advocacy Work ==
While ADAP Advocacy primarily focuses on issues related specifically to state ADAPs and the federal appropriations associated with them, their work has also extended to other issues related to access to HIV care and treatment and public health, including:

- 340B Drug Pricing Program

The 340B Drug Pricing Program is a U.S. federal program created in 1992 that requires drug manufacturers to provide outpatient drugs to eligible healthcare organizations and covered entities at significantly reduced prices. Those covered entities then receive the difference between the reduced prices and the list prices for 340B eligible drugs in the form of rebates that count as revenue.

In November 2022, ADAP Advocacy formed the Ryan White Grantee 340B Patient Advisory Committee to address gaps in knowledge and awareness among patients, advocates, providers, organizations, and industry partners about the 340B Program. The advisory committee first convened in January 2023 and meets quarterly.

- Counterfeit prescription drugs

ADAP Advocacy raises awareness of counterfeit prescription medications. ADAP Advocacy has developed public service announcements (PSAs), blog posts, op-eds, and interviews with press outlets in an effort educate patients about the risks of and how to identify counterfeit medications.

ADAP Advocacy's other advocacy work has included:

- Prescription drug importation
- Affordable Care Act’s impact on Ryan White CARE Act programs
- Medicare-related issues
- HIV/AIDS clinical care guidelines
- COVID-19
- Pre-exposure prophylaxis (PrEP) for the prevention of HIV transmission
- HIV care for transgender populations
- HIV care for incarcerated populations
- Long-acting injectable (LAI) medications for the treatment of HIV and HIV-related conditions
