= Intentional contagion of infection =

Intentional contagion of infection, also called voluntary contagion, conscious contagion, or intentional transmission is the act by which a human being deliberately infects another with a pathogen knowing that they will be infected. In some legislations of some countries this act has been criminalized, managing to prosecute it and consider it as aggravating for fraud or recklessness.

One of the most frequent cases of intentional contagion is that of viruses and bacteria that are considered sexually transmitted infections, being commonly the most common methods through the malicious use of syringes and the unsafe sexual act, such as the criminal transmission of HIV.

== Prevention measures for different transmissible diseases ==
=== COVID-19 ===
In 2020, during the national quarantine in Italy due to the coronavirus pandemic, the Italian authorities put in place a series of strict measures to prevent the increase in cases of those infected, eventually being able to judicially punish those who disobey these indications.

== See also ==
- Pox party
- Coronavirus party
- Biological agent
- STD notifications in dating services
- Electronic health record (EHR)
- Electronic medical record (EMR)
- Medical privacy
