= Chickenpox (South Park) =

- South Park episode
- Episode no.: Season 2 Episode 10
- Directed by: Trey Parker
- Written by: Trey Parker; Matt Stone; Trisha Nixon
- Production code: 210
- Original air date: August 26, 1998

Episode chronology
← Previous "Chef's Chocolate Salty Balls"	Next → "Roger Ebert Should Lay Off the Fatty Foods"
- South Park season 2

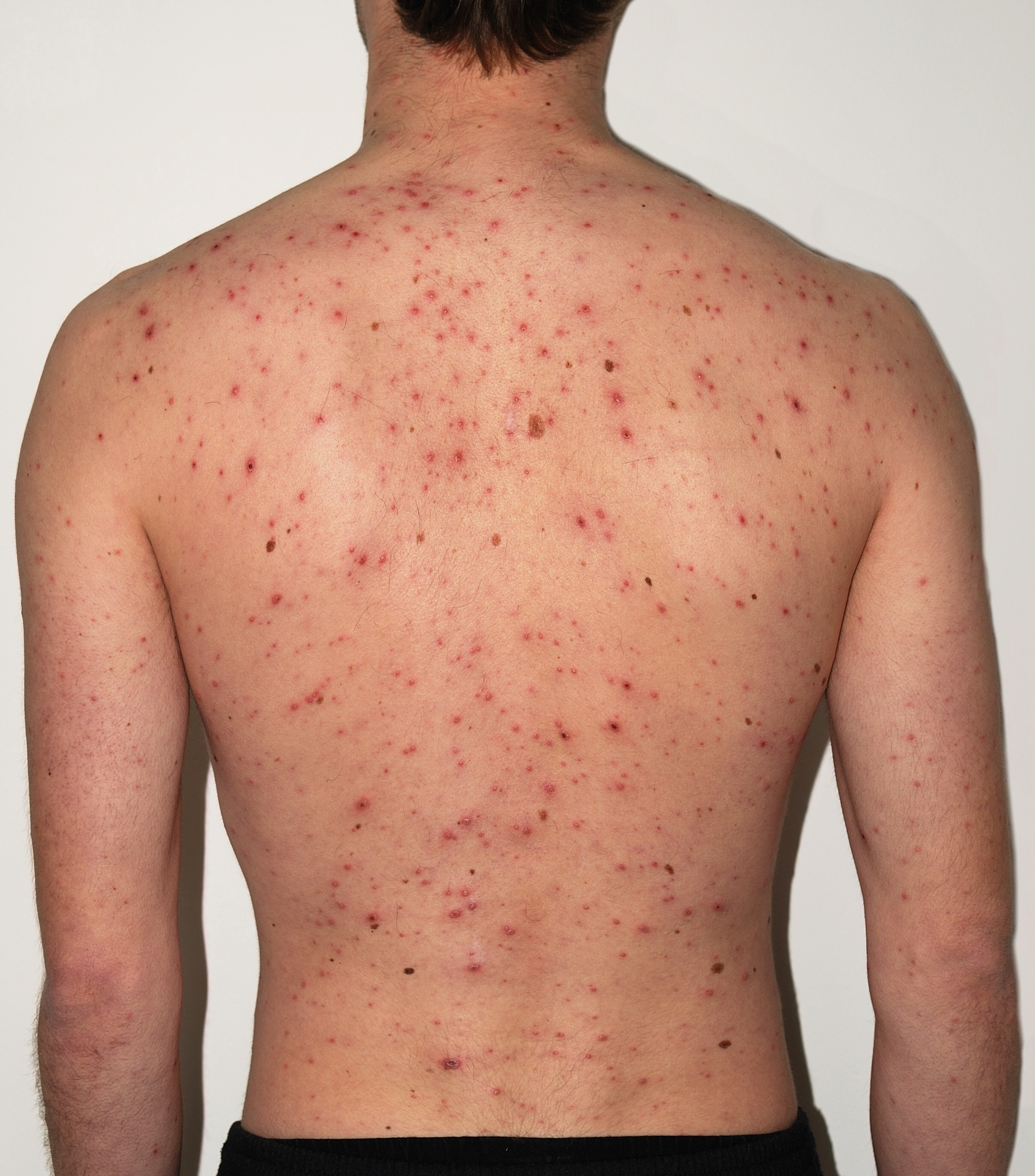
Chickenpox disease

"Chickenpox" is the tenth episode of the second season of the American animated television series South Park. The 23rd episode of the series overall, it originally aired on Comedy Central in the United States on August 26, 1998. The episode was written by series co-creators Trey Parker and Matt Stone, along with Trisha Nixon, and directed by Parker. In the episode, the parents of South Park intentionally expose their children to the chickenpox disease.

== Plot ==
Chickenpox infects Stan's sister Shelley and Kenny. The other boys' mothers begin to think that maybe the other boys should be exposed to it too, so as to get it while they are young, when it is easier to deal with. They agree and have the other boys stay at Kenny's house. The boys are unenthusiastic about spending the night at Kenny's house because he is poor. The next day, Cartman and Stan get sick, but not Kyle. Stan's chickenpox gets so bad he has to be brought to the hospital with Shelley. Sheila Broflovski tries sending Kyle over to Kenny's house again, much to Kyle's protests, but he still fails to catch the disease.

Sheila, after learning from Carol McCormick that her husband, Stuart, and Gerald, Sheila's husband, had once been close friends, decides to try to patch things up between them by setting them both up on a fishing trip. However, the trip does not go well and the two fight. Apparently, Stuart is jealous of Gerald's success. Having spent time at the McCormick residence, Kyle wonders if one of their obligations as the Jewish faith is to give part of their earnings to Kenny's family. Gerald gives Kyle a lecture on how Stuart decided not to get as much education as Gerald did and is happy at his low-paying job. Gerald further uses the example how people like Stuart are the ones who do menial labor and keep society functioning and that having "gods and clods" is part of a free society. As part of his homework assignment, this makes Kyle come up with a plan to eliminate all the poor people in the world to make it a better place: by putting them in camps. While Gerald did not suggest doing harm to the McCormicks; when he reads Kyle's essay titled "The Final Solution"; he realizes the callousness of the earlier lecture.

After Kyle learns from his mom that she tried to get him sick, he breaks Stan out of the hospital. Both go to Cartman's house to retrieve him and all of the boys decide to get revenge on the adults for what they did. The parents begin a frantic search, while the boys see Old Frida, a local prostitute with herpes in her mouth, and pay her to go to their homes and use the parents' items to give them all herpes. The parents find the children and bring them back to the hospital; Kyle finally falls ill and passes out on the floor. With all the boys in hospital, they laugh at their herpes-riddled parents, who accept the boys' actions while Kenny suddenly dies from chickenpox. Everyone is shocked, but just then continue laughing.

== Home media ==
All 18 episodes of the second season, including "Chickenpox", were released on a DVD box set on June 3, 2003.

== Reception ==
The A.V. Club gave the episode mixed reviews, praising the fact that in addressing the economic disparity between the adults, the writers "brought up something troubling and irreconcilable in order to wring laughs from it, and they weren’t about to cheapen that with some half-assed little scene based on the lie that it might really be reassuring and easy to settle after all". However, the review also found that "they don't have any great ideas about what how to wrap things up without such a scene" and therefore "run out the clock". In 2024, MovieWeb listed it as number 16 on its list of "17 Underrated South Park Episodes That Got Better with Age", describing it as "a great episode for showing early South Park's ability to make the boys' fundamental misunderstanding of a situation simultaneously provide a lesson for all involved". The episode, along with an episode of The Simpsons, "Milhouse of Sand and Fog", has been noted for presenting a pox party intended to spread varicella.

Digital Spy listed the episode on its "13 times South Park totally nailed video games", noting the presence of "an ageing ColecoVision in the corner of Kenny's living room", which serves as a means of highlighting the character's lower economic status. The episode was one of five during the show's early seasons in which Kenny is killed by illness or disease.
