= Richard J. Schmidt =

American former physician

Richard J. Schmidt (1948/1949 – February 12, 2023) was an American former physician who was convicted by a Louisiana court in 1998 of attempted second degree murder for injecting his mistress, Janice Trahan, with human immunodeficiency virus (HIV). The case marked the first time in forensic history that viral RNA was used to prove a link between two people with HIV or acquired immune deficiency syndrome (AIDS) in a criminal trial.

In 1994, Schmidt used a sample of blood taken from one of his HIV-positive patients to inject into his lover and former colleague, Janice Trahan, infecting her with HIV. Six months later, Trahan, a nurse, was diagnosed with HIV. Convinced that Schmidt had infected her after a suspiciously fleeting late-night visit to give her a "vitamin B" injection, Trahan had her ex-husband and former sexual partners tested. All were shown to be negative for HIV—results which led Lafayette, Louisiana police to further investigate her claims.

HIV is a fairly fragile RNA virus, and lasts for only a few hours outside the human body. Detectives examining hospital records found that Schmidt had taken blood from one patient that night, but had never sent the blood to the lab. The absence of laboratory testing identification references against this patient's name led to police visiting the man who readily disclosed that he had AIDS and that he had been called in for a blood test by Schmidt on the evening in question. The forensic challenge at that point was to match the RNA from the virus itself from the patient to the victim, a process known as strain analysis that had never been attempted before. HIV RNA was collected from the victim, from the putative patient source, and from thirty-two other unrelated, HIV-positive individuals living in the same metropolitan area. Scientists concluded that of all the samples they tested, the two viruses' RNA from the victim and the patient matched almost exactly, even with HIV's potential to mutate very rapidly.

It was further disclosed at trial that the victim had also acquired hepatitis C around the same time. Evidence from Schmidt's patient records showed that a blood sample was taken from a patient with hepatitis C the day before the HIV-infected sample was taken. The hepatitis C sample was similarly not matched with any laboratory references – these two were the only such omissions found in Schmidt's patient records. In 1998, Schmidt was sentenced to 50 years in prison for attempted second degree murder. In 2015, after 17 years served of his 50-year sentence, Schmidt was unanimously denied parole by the three-member State Board at a June hearing in Baton Rouge.

On March, 3, 2023, the Louisiana Department of Public Safety & Corrections confirmed that Schmidt had died at a Baton Rouge hospital in Department of Corrections custody on February 12. Schmidt was 74.

== In media ==
- This case was shown on the television series Forensic Files in the ninth episode of its eighth season, entitled "Shot of Vengeance".
