= COVID-19 lockdowns in Italy =

Aspect of viral disease pandemic

COVID-19 lockdown in Italy
- Part of COVID-19 pandemic in Italy
- Date: 9 March 2020 – 18 May 2020 (Note: The lockdown started in Northern Italy on 8 March 2020, but later expanded to the whole of Italy a day later) (2 months, 1 week and 2 days)
- Location: Italy; San Marino; Vatican City
- Caused by: COVID-19 pandemic in Italy
- Goals: containing the outbreak of COVID-19 in Italy
- Methods: ban of non-essential travel; limitation of free movement, except in cases of necessity; ban of public events; closure of commercial and retail businesses, except essential goods sellers and banks; suspension of teaching in schools and universities; under-surveillance quarantine of infected persons; shutdown of all non-essential businesses and industries (23 March–3 May)
- Result: about 60 million people quarantined (Italian population)

On 9 March 2020, the government of Italy under Prime Minister Giuseppe Conte imposed a national lockdown or quarantine, restricting the movement of the population except for necessity, work, and health circumstances, in response to the growing pandemic of COVID-19 in the country. Additional lockdown restrictions mandated the temporary closure of non-essential shops and businesses. This followed restrictions announced on the previous day which affected sixteen million people in the whole region of Lombardy and fourteen largely-neighbouring provinces in Emilia-Romagna, Veneto, Piedmont and Marche, and prior to that, a smaller-scale lockdown of ten municipalities in the province of Lodi and one in the province of Padua that had begun in late February.

The lockdown measures, despite being widely approved by public opinion polls, were also described as the largest suppression of constitutional rights in the history of the republic. Nevertheless, Article 16 of the Constitution states that travel restrictions may be established by law for reasons of health or security.

Italy was the first country to enact a COVID-19 lockdown nationwide; many countries would introduce similar measures in subsequent months as the COVID-19 pandemic spread globally.

== Background ==
Following the outbreak of COVID-19, the Italian government confirmed the country's first cases of the disease on 30 January 2020, when the virus was detected in two Chinese tourists visiting Italy. A third case was confirmed on 7 February, with the patient being an Italian man evacuated from Wuhan. The number of confirmed cases increased on 21 February, when sixteen people in Lombardy and Veneto were confirmed to be infected. Following the first two deaths of people with the virus, several towns in Lombardy were placed on lockdown due to the large number of infected patients in the region.

== History ==
=== Initial lockdowns ===
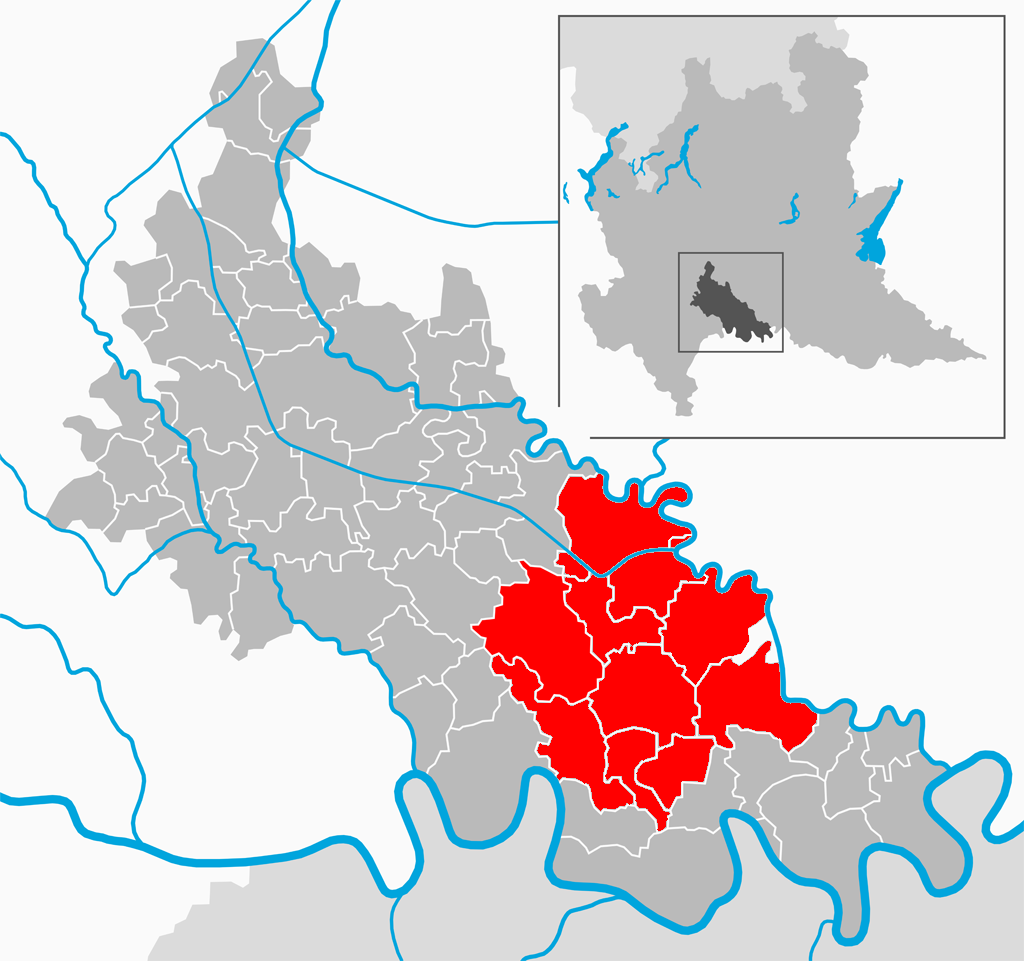
Map of Lodi Province showing ten of the eleven quarantined municipalities prior to the zone's expansion

The first lockdown began around 21 February 2020, covering ten municipalities of the province of Lodi in Lombardy and one in the province of Padua in Veneto, and affecting around 50,000 people. In the most affected town of Codogno (pop. 16,000), police cars blocked roads into and out of the quarantined area and erected barriers. The quarantined "red zone" (zona rossa) was initially enforced by police and Carabinieri, and by 27 February it was reported that 400 policemen were enforcing it with 35 checkpoints. The lockdown was initially meant to last until 6 March. While residents were permitted to leave their homes with supplies such as food and medicine being allowed to enter, attending school or going to workplaces was not allowed, and public gatherings were prohibited. Train services also bypassed the region.

=== Expansion to northern provinces ===
Early on Sunday 8 March 2020, Italian Prime Minister Giuseppe Conte announced the expansion of the quarantine zone to cover much of northern Italy, affecting over sixteen million people, restricting travel from, to or within the affected areas, banning funerals and cultural events, and requiring people to keep at least one metre of distance from one another in public locations such as restaurants, churches and supermarkets. Conte later clarified in a press conference that the decree was not an "absolute ban", and that people would still be able to use trains and planes to and from the region for "proven work needs, emergencies, or health reasons". Additionally, tourists from outside were still permitted to leave the area.

Restaurants and cafes were permitted to open, but operations were limited to between 6:00 and 18:00, while many other public locations such as gyms, nightclubs, museums and swimming pools were closed altogether. Businesses were ordered to implement "smart working processes" to permit their employees to work from home. The decree, in effect until 3 April, additionally cancelled any leave for medical workers, and allowed the government to impose fines or up to three months' jail for people caught leaving or entering the affected zone without permission. The decree also implemented restrictions on public gatherings elsewhere across Italy. With this decree, the initial "Red Zone" was also abolished (though the municipalities were still within the quarantined area).

The lockdown measures implemented by Italy was considered the most radical measure implemented against the outbreak outside of the lockdown measures implemented in China. At the time of the decree, over 5,800 cases of coronavirus had been confirmed in Italy, with 233 dead. A draft of the decree had been leaked to the media late on Saturday night before it went into effect and was published by Corriere della Sera, resulting in panic within the to-be-quarantined areas and prompting reactions from politicians in the region. La Repubblica reported that hundreds of people in Milan rushed out to leave the city on the last trains on Saturday night, as a part of a rush in general to leave the expanded red zone. La Repubblica later reported that this was an exaggeration and that, through an analysis of telephone cells, less than 1,000 people had left Milan for the southern regions during 7 March; by comparison, on 23 February, about 9,000 people left Milan for the south. However, within hours of the decree being signed, media outlets reported that relatively little had changed, with trains and planes still operating to and from the region, and restaurants and cafes operating normally. The BBC reported that some flights to Milan continued on 8 March, though several were cancelled. New guidelines for the coronavirus had assigned the responsibility of deciding whether to suspend flights to local judiciaries.

Areas quarantined on 8 March

Provinces under quarantine, 8 March
Province	Region	Population
Alessandria	Piedmont	420,017
Asti	Piedmont	214,342
Bergamo	Lombardy	1,115,536
Brescia	Lombardy	1,265,954
Como	Lombardy	599,204
Cremona	Lombardy	358,955
Lecco	Lombardy	337,380
Lodi	Lombardy	230,198
Mantua	Lombardy	411,958
Milan	Lombardy	3,263,206
Modena	Emilia-Romagna	705,422
Monza and Brianza	Lombardy	875,769
Novara	Piedmont	368,607
Padua	Veneto	938,957
Parma	Emilia-Romagna	452,022
Pavia	Lombardy	545,888
Pesaro and Urbino	Marche	358,886
Piacenza	Emilia-Romagna	287,152
Reggio Emilia	Emilia-Romagna	531,891
Rimini	Emilia-Romagna	339,437
Sondrio	Lombardy	180,811
Treviso	Veneto	888,293
Varese	Lombardy	890,768
Venice	Veneto	857,841
Verbano-Cusio-Ossola	Piedmont	157,844
Vercelli	Piedmont	170,298
Quarantine total		16,466,636

The locked down area, as of 8 March 2020, covered the entirety of the region of Lombardy, in addition to fourteen provinces in Piedmont, Veneto, Emilia-Romagna, and Marche. This area included the cities of Milan and Venice, and comprises three separate areas (around Lombardy, around Venice, and another zone surrounding San Marino). The affected area is populated by over sixteen million people, roughly a quarter of the Italian population. Quarantines covered an area of approximately 56,000 square kilometres (22,000 sq mi).

=== Nationwide expansion ===
On the evening of 9 March, the quarantine measures were expanded to the entire country, coming into effect the next day. In a televised address, Conte explained that the moves would restrict travel to that necessary for work, and family emergencies, and that all sporting events would be cancelled. Italy was the first country to implement a national quarantine as a result of the COVID-19 pandemic.

Conte announced on 11 March that the lockdown would be tightened, with all commercial and retail businesses except those providing essential services, like grocery stores, food stores, and pharmacies, closed down. On 19 March, with over 35,000 confirmed cases and nearly 3,000 deaths from the disease, Conte stated that the lockdown would likely be extended past its initial deadline of 3 April.

Luigi Di Maio, the Minister of Foreign Affairs, has said that the lockdown has been necessary for Italy. The Italian authorities established sanctions for those who do not obey the orders, even those who, having symptoms of the virus, expose themselves in public places, being considered a threat of intentional contagion.

On 21 March, Conte announced a further enlargement of the lockdown, by shutting down all non-necessary businesses and industries. This measure came after a rise in the number of cases and deaths in the previous days, and after multiple institutions – including trade unions, mayors, and regional presidents – asked for a generalised shutdown of the Italian production system. On 22 March, Lombardy strengthened its measures, banning all outdoor physical activity and the use of vending machines.

On 1 April, Minister of Health Roberto Speranza announced the extension of the lockdown until 13 April.

On 10 April, the lockdown was extended until 3 May, and starting from 14 April stationery shops, bookshops and children clothing's shops will be allowed to open.

On 26 April, the Prime Minister announced the so-called "Phase 2", that would start from 4 May. Movements across regions were still forbidden, while the ones between municipalities were allowed only for work and health reasons as well as for visit relatives. Moreover, he allowed the re-opening of closed factories, but schools, bars, restaurants and barbers were still closed.

== Subsequent restrictions (late 2020–2021) ==
Following a second wave of infections beginning in October 2020, the Italian government reintroduced stricter restrictions. On 13 October 2020, the government banned public gatherings and gave regions the power to tighten but not ease containment measures. On 25 October, Prime Minister Conte introduced new restrictions closing gyms, swimming pools, theatres and cinemas, and requiring bars and restaurants to close by 6pm. In November 2020, Italy introduced a colour-coded tier system; white, yellow, orange and red zones, with different restrictions based on infection rates and healthcare capacity. A national red zone with travel bans between regions and municipalities was established for the Christmas 2020 and Easter 2021 holidays. Most COVID-19 restrictions were gradually lifted through 2022, with the majority abolished on 1 June 2022.

== Impact ==
=== Economy ===
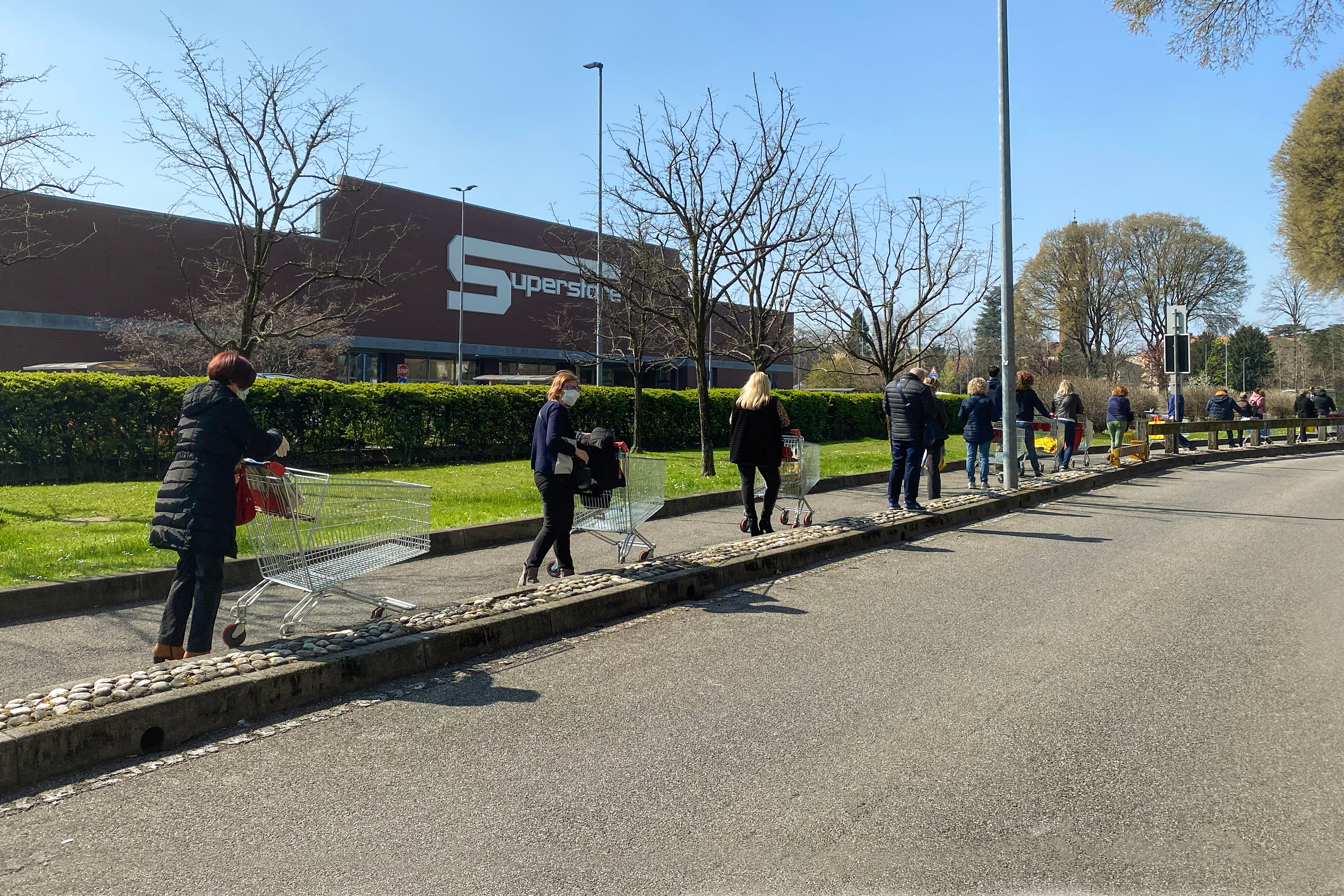
Queue in front of a supermarket after the introduction of social distancing rules

The New York Times Rome bureau chief Jason Horowitz referred to the expanded lockdown as "sacrificing the Italian economy in the short term to save it from the ravages of the virus in the long term", with Milan considered the country's economic capital while Venice was one of its most important tourist destinations. The regions of Lombardy and Veneto alone produced a third of the Italian gross domestic product.

Prior to the quarantine's expansion, the Italian economy was already forecast to enter a recession due to the impact of the outbreak, with the tourism and luxury goods sector being particularly hard-hit by a reduction of travel. The impact of the wider quarantine is predicted to bring the European economy as a whole into a recession, and will disrupt supply chains to, for example, German car manufacturers like Volkswagen. Prior to the quarantine, Scope Ratings GmbH estimated on 2 March an annual contraction in Italian GDP in 2020, with the budget deficit rising past 2.5% of GDP. The Berenberg Bank revised its forecast for the Italian economic growth in 2020 from -0.3% before the lockdown to -1.2%. An economist at London-based consultancy Capital Economics estimated Italy's 2020 GDP decline to be 2 percent after the national lockdown, assuming that the lockdown is lifted on schedule. Reuters reported on 20 March that Ministry of Economy and Finance was expecting a 3% GDP contraction in 2020, assuming the lockdown would be loosened by the end of April. On 1 April, Economy Minister Roberto Gualtieri stated that a 6% GDP contraction for 2020 was "realistic".

The FTSE MIB, Italy's benchmark stock index, fell 11 percent on 9 March when the market reopened, dubbed "Black Monday". Particularly hard-hit sectors due to the lockdown are the hospitality, food service, retail, art, entertainment and transport sectors, altogether making up around 23 percent of the country's gross domestic product. Tourism, another 6 percent, is also forecasted to experience a crisis, with normally crowded destinations being empty.

On 20 July 2022, Domino's Pizza's Italian franchise EPizza SpA closed all its 29 stores, terminating Domino's Italian operations. EPizza SpA had earlier filed for bankruptcy in April 2022 following two years of declining revenue caused by COVID-19 lockdown restrictions and competition from local pizza chains and restaurants, which began using food deliver app services.

=== Environment ===
During the lockdowns in early 2020, emissions of nitrogen dioxide, or NO_{2}, fell drastically in northern Italy, most likely as a result of fewer diesel engines in operation.

=== Effectiveness ===
The effects on social movement of such measures were visible. A reduction of 50% of movement between provinces and of 19% of personal interactions comparing 22 February and 10 March was calculated by the company Cuebiq and the University of Turin using data from mobile phone companies. On 17 March, the vice-president of Lombardy Fabrizio Sala reported a level of an overall 60% decrease of social mobility in the region, comparing the situation of 16 March to 20 February, although such level was not considered sufficient.

About 700,000 citizens were stopped and checked between 11 and 17 March alone, of which 43,000 were decided to have violated the quarantine, including at least two priests who were officiating funeral services (which were banned by the decree).

The comparison of the province of Lodi (where a rigid lockdown was imposed in certain areas starting on 24 February) and the province of Bergamo (where it started later on 9 March) on 17 March showed that the first one recovered faster and the exponential increase of cases stopped.

On 3 April, Google published a series of mobility reports, using aggregated data to show the trend of how busy some categories of places were, and comparing them to a baseline evaluated in the months of January and February. The data for Italy showed a 94% drop for retail and recreation places, an 85% drop for grocery shops and pharmacies, a 90% drop for parks and beaches, an 87% drop for public transit hubs, a 63% drop for workplaces, and a 24% rise for residential places.

The differences in lockdown efficacy have also been attributed to different characteristics of the population of different Italian regions, such as disparities in social capital. Research on the lockdown highlighted a positive role in directing individual behavior toward greater respect of the policy.

== Reactions ==
=== Domestic ===
Both Attilio Fontana, the President of Lombardy, and Luca Zaia, the President of Veneto, criticised the quarantine measures, with Fontana requesting better clarification regarding the quarantine from the central government, while Zaia opposed it altogether. President of Emilia-Romagna Stefano Bonaccini called the decree "confusing" and requested the central government take more time to develop a "coherent" solution. Maurizio Rasero, mayor of the quarantined municipality of Asti, posted a video on his Facebook page complaining about the sudden announcement of the quarantine, of which he had not been informed beforehand. The decree was also criticised by local business leaders, who claimed that the decree did not have sufficient clarifications on the details of the quarantine. Matteo Salvini, Italy's opposition leader, also demanded further clarity regarding the lockdown.

On the other hand, Novara's mayor Alessandro Canelli mentioned that he was surprised by the initial information he received that his province would not be part of the quarantine zone, and had requested for Novara's inclusion due to its significant transport links with Milan. President of Marche Luca Ceriscioli agreed to the measures, although he mentioned a need for more participation from the impacted territories.

Responding to the thousands of people who evacuated from Lombardy just before the 8 March quarantine was put in place, police officers and medics met passengers from Lombardy in Salerno, Campania, and the passengers were required to self-quarantine. Michele Emiliano, President of Apulia, required all arrivals from northern Italy to self-quarantine. Similarly, Jole Santelli, President of Calabria, called for Calabrians living in northern Italy not to return home during the outbreak, and for the government to "block an exodus to Calabria".

Conte, alongside other leaders, requested Italians to avoid engaging in "furbizia"—i.e. craftiness to circumvent rules and bureaucracy—during the lockdown. Conte also told la Repubblica that Italy was facing its "darkest hour".

=== Residents ===
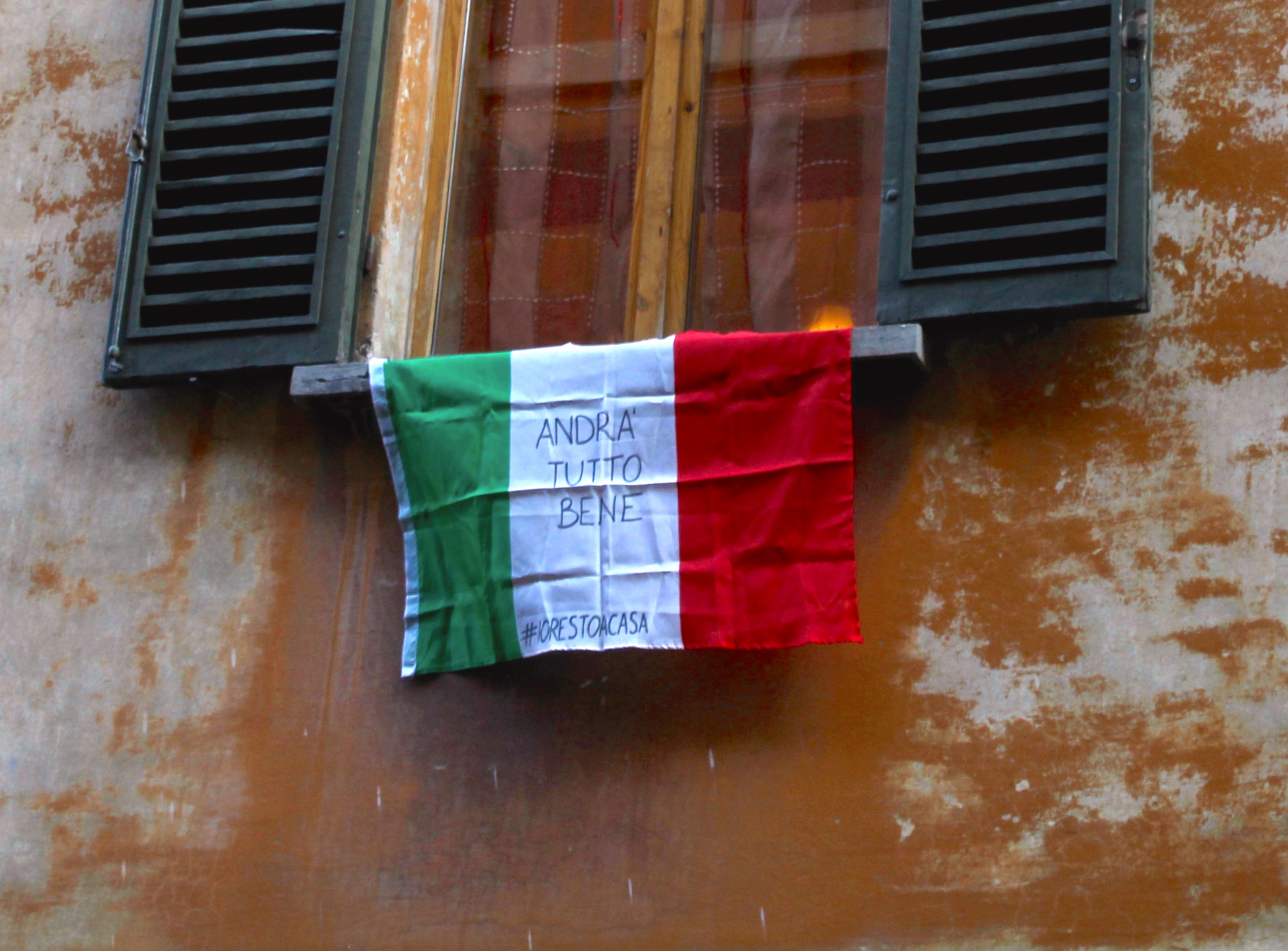
An Italian flag with the slogan "Andrà tutto bene" ("Everything will be alright")

In the initial quarantine, a special radio station (Radio Zona Rossa, or "Radio Red Zone") was set up for residents of the Codogno quarantine area, broadcasting updates on the quarantine situation, interviews with authorities, and government information. Catholic sermons were also broadcast through the radio.

Following the quarantine's expansion, the hashtag #IoRestoACasa ("I stay at home") was shared by thousands of social media users. In compliance with regulations on keeping one metre of distance between each other in public locations, bars and restaurants placed duct tape on floors for their customers to follow. Rushes to supermarkets in cities such as Rome and Palermo were reported as residents engaged in panic buying following the nationwide quarantine announcement.

=== Vatican ===
After the Italian national lockdown was announced, the Vatican closed the Vatican Museums and suspended Masses and public liturgies. While the St. Peter's Basilica remained open, its catacombs were closed and visitors were required to follow the Italian regulations on the one-metre separation. Catholic Mass in Rome and the Vatican were also suspended until 3 April, and Pope Francis opted to instead live stream daily Mass. Dismayed by the Vicar General's complete closure of all churches in the Diocese of Rome, Pope Francis partially reversed the closures, but tourists are still barred from visiting the churches.

=== International ===
The Director-General of the World Health Organization, Tedros Adhanom, praised Italy's decision to implement the lockdown, saying the Italian people and government were "making genuine sacrifices" with these "bold, courageous steps".

Sun Shuopeng, vice president of the Chinese Red Cross, visited Milan and heavily criticised the enforcement of the lockdown, saying "the lockdown measures are very lax".

According to a survey by Bloomberg, Italy and Spain rank among the countries that have more strictly complied with lockdown measures.

== See also ==
- COVID-19 pandemic in Italy
- COVID-19 lockdowns by country
- COVID-19 community quarantines in the Philippines
- COVID-19 lockdown in China
- COVID-19 lockdown in India
- Indonesia large-scale social restrictions
- Malaysian movement control order
- 2020–21 Singapore circuit breaker measures
