= Infectious diseases within American prisons =

Epidemiology of American prisons

Infectious diseases within American correctional settings are a concern within the public health sector. The corrections population is susceptible to infectious diseases through exposure to blood and other bodily fluids, drug injection, poor health care, prison overcrowding, demographics, security issues, lack of community support for rehabilitation programs, and high-risk behaviors. The spread of infectious diseases, such as HIV and other sexually transmitted infections, hepatitis C (HCV), hepatitis B (HBV), and tuberculosis, result largely from needle-sharing, drug use, and consensual and non-consensual sex among prisoners. HIV and hepatitis C need specific attention because of the specific public health concerns and issues they raise.

The implementation of HIV and STI screening programs in the correctional setting is an important approach to reducing the annual number of new HIV infections in the United States. The correctional system in America is a patchwork of a wide variety of settings such as state and federal prisons, local jails, and juvenile detention centers and they include the legal constraints of state laws. One process for HIV testing would be unlikely or even impossible in all correctional settings.

There is an inherent difference in the jail versus the prison setting that merits infectious disease testing at the jail level. Jails are largely used to hold offenders who have been charged but not convicted of a crime. Local jails admitted an estimated 11.7 million persons during the 12-month period ending June 30, 2013. The average weekly turnover rate was 60.2 percent. Implementing HIV, HCV and other STI screening programs at the jail level is an effective way to detect disease before an infected individual is released back to the community and is able to transmit disease.

== At-risk diseases ==
=== HIV/AIDS ===
At least 17% of people living with HIV/AIDS have been incarcerated at some point in their life. The rate of contracting HIV is ten to one hundred times higher inside the prison system than outside. The incarcerated population is more likely to contract the disease because they are exposed to more high-risk behaviors within the correctional system. In a Louisiana prison study, 242 inmates (72.8% of male inmates) had participated in sexual encounters with other men, and did not always have access to proper protection. Additionally, research has demonstrated that infection rates via injection are much higher among those who have previously served prison terms. Research suggests that elevated rates of infection are a result of increased prison sentencing for drug-related offences and the war on drugs. Since prisons generally divide the individuals by gender, the populations experience different environments; incarcerated females in the United States tend to have higher rates of infection.

According to the U.S. Department of Justice's Bureau of Justice Statistics, at the end of 2010 among all of the U.S. inmates with HIV/AIDS 18,337 of them were male and 1,756 were female. Research suggests young men of color disproportionately represent U.S. inmates and these individuals may be at such a risk of contracting HIV due to high-risk behavior prior to entering the penitentiary system. Furthermore, research also shows that AIDS is the single largest cause of death among African American men between ages 25 through 44 years, mainly due to drug-related transmission of the virus. As of September 2013, condoms for prisoners are only available in the US state of Vermont (on September 17, 2013, the California Senate approved a bill for condom distribution inside the state's prisons, but the bill was not yet law at the time of approval).

A 2004 survey of inmates at state prisons and local jails revealed a self-reported HIV positive rate of 1.9% and 2.5% respectively. Sixty-nine percent of state inmates reported being tested since admission to the system while only 18.5% of those in the jail reported being tested. This suggests that expanded jail testing could increase the number of previously unidentified cases of HIV. In prisons, where inmates are incarcerated for more than a year, testing should take place at the medical evaluation. In jails, where a majority of inmates bail out between 72 hours and seven days, routine testing should ideally take place at the intake evaluation. This may not be possible if the inmate is under the influence of drugs or alcohol or is otherwise mentally unstable. While medical evaluations typically occur within 10 days of detention, some inmates may have been released and thus will not get tested.

=== Hepatitis C ===
While the majority of HCV infections occur outside of prison, the infection is still widespread within the prison system as a result of drug injection. According to one Rhode Island prison study, HCV infection was found in 23.1% of the male prison population. HCV prevention proved to be more challenging than HIV prevention because inmates partake in high-risk behaviors such as "front loading" and sharing spoons to prepare drugs like cocaine. The prevalence of these infections within prisons is a concern because they pose a potential public health risk. When prisoners are released, they may continue the same behaviors, thereby increasing the chances of the infection spreading to outside communities. The Western Journal of Medicine estimates the prevalence and predictors of HCV infection among inmates of California by conducting a system wide survey. Findings concluded that HCV infection appears most common in men and women entering prison, displaying prevalence of anti-HCV positive highest among white males and Latina women.

Limited testing for hepatitis C virus (HCV) in three North Carolina jails have shown a prevalence rate of approximately 7% for HCV. The primary barrier is the cost of additional tests needed beyond a screening test. However, some hematologists believe a screening test should be done regardless of ability to pay for follow-up care as a means of changing behavior (for example, refraining from alcohol or not sharing needles). Studies have shown that knowledge of disease status can change behavior with HIV infection. It is estimated that 80% of people with HIV who inject drugs also have hepatitis C virus. HIV co-infection more than triples the risk for liver disease, liver failure, and liver-related death from HCV.

=== Tuberculosis ===
The incidence of tuberculosis in the United States prison system is also significantly higher than rates in the general public. It is estimated that prisoners in the United States are four times as likely as individuals outside of the carceral setting. This is worth noting because although the prevalence of tuberculosis is higher among incarcerated populations, this is not a population that is actively targeted by TB prevention programs. According to a comprehensive review of the 2002 to 2013 Tuberculosis Surveillance System, rates remain high- particularly in the male prisoner population, "Among 5579 persons incarcerated at the time of their tuberculosis diagnosis, 2520 (45%) were US-born and 495 (9%) were female. Median estimated annual tuberculosis incidence rates were 29 cases per 100 000 local jail inmates, 8 per 100 000 state prisoners, and 25 per 100 000 federal prisoners." These rates of infection are significant, as if TB is not properly managed it can have lasting side effects including: permanent lung damage, infection of the bones, spine, brain and spinal cord. Proper attention and care must be provided to this vulnerable population to prevent morbidity and mortality in the United States inmate population.

=== COVID-19 ===
During the first half of 2020, three-quarters of outbreaks of over 500 people occurred at correctional facilities. At least 13 people incarcerated at Marion Correctional Institute died of COVID-19.

By late August 2021, over 2,500 people had died from COVID-19 while incarcerated in U.S. prisons.

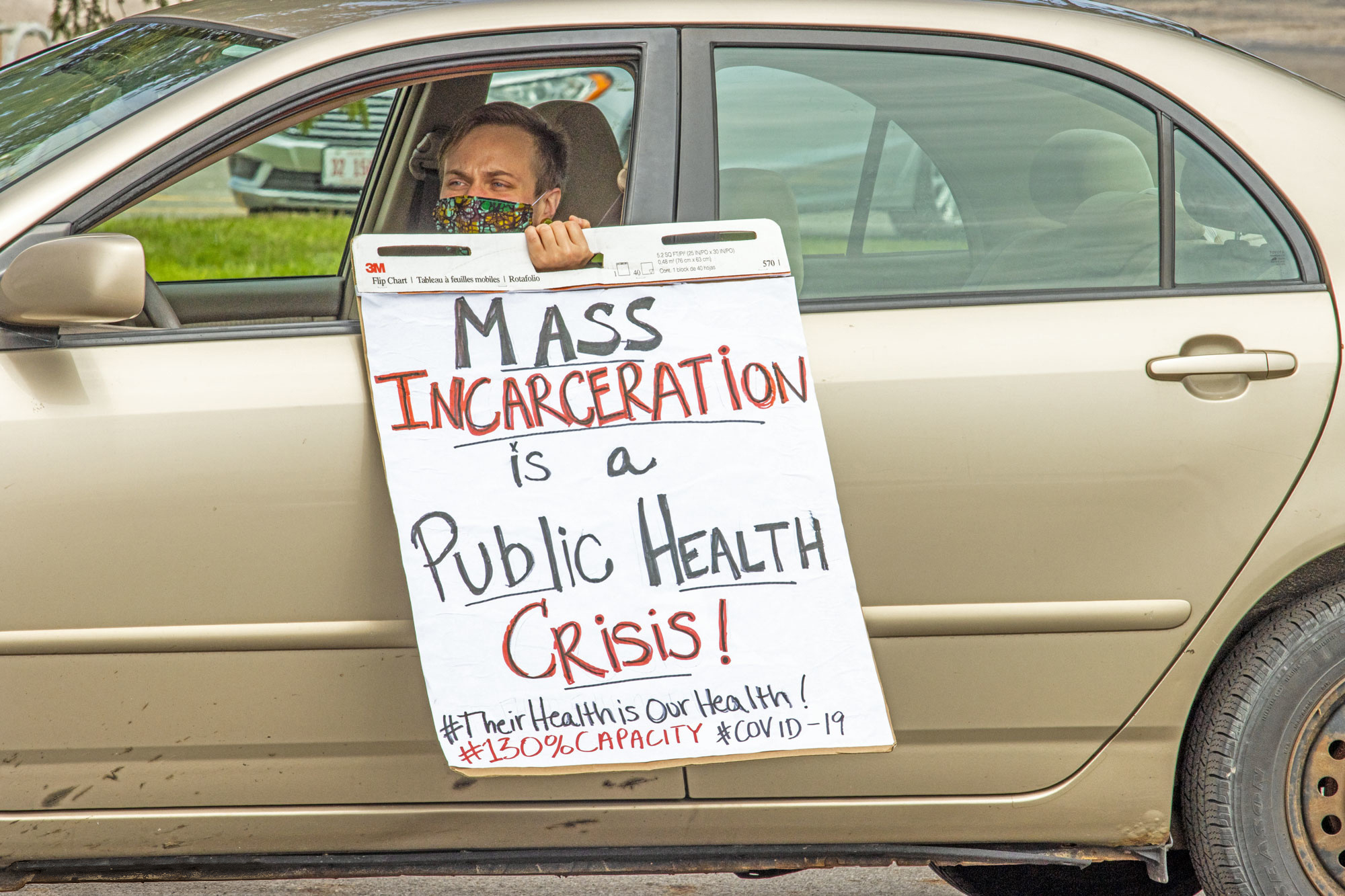
April 24, 2020: Protest event in Columbus, Ohio calling for 20,000 early prison releases

On any given day, 2.3 million people were incarcerated in 6,000 facilities in the United States, presenting officials with the difficult task of preventing coronavirus outbreaks among prisoners and staff. Prisoners often sleep close together. Many prisons have poor sanitation, and alcohol-based hand sanitizer is often prohibited for inmates.

The vast majority of these prisoners were in state or local custody. A remaining minority of prisoners were in federal custody.

Between March 22–26, 2020, 23 inmates escaped and at least one inmate tested positive for COVID-19 in each of two prisons. Judges ordered the liberation of thousands of prison inmates, and there were calls to release all medically vulnerable inmates.

On December 18, 2020, the Associated Press and The Marshall Project stated that one in five prisoners in the United States had been infected with the COVID virus. This was over four times the infection rate of the general population around the time of the report. In some states, half of prisoners had been infected.

COVID-19 has also spread at an elevated rate within immigration detention facilities in the United States.

== Differences in funding for sexually transmitted infections treatment ==
In 2002, the Public Health Reports released a study entitled "Comparing Quality of Care for Sexually Transmitted Diseases in Specialized and General Clinics", explaining the quality of care provided in public STI clinics and general medical clinics when treating patients with STIs. In October 1995, the County of Los Angeles Department of Health Services faced a budget deficit that led to the decision of restructuring their outpatient care system. The result of this restructuring led to the following: 17 LA County STI clinics and 3 of general medical clinics were also closed down. This then resulted in the shift of "balance of STD services in favor of general medical clinics." Reduced funding greatly therefore affecting the quality of patient care. Six clinics were studied from March 1, 1996, to June 30, 1996, with the data of patients recorded during each visit. Thirty-two process of care quality indicators were determined that listed patient expectations during visitation. Data showed that the public STI clinics demonstrated a greater adherence than general medical clinics for every 14 out of the 32 patient care quality indicators. As a result, both the general medical clinics and STI clinics suffered from the budget deficit of 1995.

Separate studies assessed the practicality and cost-efficiency of vaccinating all adults treated at STI clinics in a span of a year. Two scenarios were compared, assuming a national program offering the Hepatitis B vaccine to two million clients in order to create a decision model. The first scenario lacked the Hepatitis B vaccination while the second followed a Hepatitis B vaccination. The stages of the HBV virus were followed in a Markov Model of Natural History. These are the stages that clients can potentially experience if they opted out of vaccination. Those that chose to be part of a routine vaccination would undergo a three-part vaccination stage within a year. The total medical cost for those who contracted the HBV virus is as follows: $1,587 million for societal costs; $346 million in medical costs; and $1,241 million in productivity losses. The projected cost for a national vaccination program that is to serve more than a million clients is "$138 million including $95 million for vaccine and administration, $30.5 million for staff training and supervision, and $12.2 million for protocol development and vaccination record-keeping.

In North Carolina, the state Department of Health and Human Services Division of Epidemiology works with the AIDS Drug Assistance Program to help pay for HIV medication for incarcerated persons in county jails (state and federal prisons are not eligible). In order to qualify, county detention centers must complete an application for funds that includes the jail health budget to show need. Additionally, Duke University and UNC-Memorial Hospitals have collaborated with one jail's HCV positive inmates for further follow-up testing and care.

== Policies within the United States ==
The World Health Organization released guidelines to counteract the spread of HIV in prisons during the 1980s. They stated prisons should apply policies that reduce sexual violence, enhance detection, prosecute offenders, and increase evaluation of activities done to prevent disease from spreading in prisons. Within the United States there have been many important policies and programs to eliminate the spread of disease and expand the healthcare system within prisons.

There are two renowned federal cases that established prisoners' rights to healthcare and paved the way for disease prevention. In Estelle v. Gamble, the court case ruled that healthcare within prisons are a constitutional right. Prior to this court case, prison systems deliberately denied prisoners much treatment, delaying access to physicians, or failing to help prisoners seek any medical judgment. This court case created measures to reduce the spread of diseases and also provided inmates with medical attention. In Wayne County Jail Inmates v. Lucas, courts mandated that prisoners have the right to access drug detoxification and treatment for drug dependency. This has helped many inmates quarantine the disease by preventing the sharing of needles.

Major programs and policies are being initiated within each state. In New York, the Hepatitis C Continuity Program was the first of its kind to remove limits on healthcare access if a prisoner spent a limited time in jail. Prisoners now have access to HCV antiviral treatment from the moment of incarceration to even post-incarceration treatment. It was first issued measure in New York involving a coalition between different sectors to provide aid for prisoners even after release. Other guidelines included collaborating with the local healthcare systems that prisoners may potentially be released to after serving their terms. Serious public health outbreaks such as the spread of methicillin-resistant Staphylococcus aureus have prompted drastic measures leading to medical isolation. Proponents of this guideline seek to establish this measure throughout all U.S. Prisons. However, ethical issues have arisen as opponents question the segregation and labeling of individuals based on their health condition.

== Preventive measures ==
=== Shortcomings and limitations ===
Approaches to preventing the spread of infections such as HIV and HCV in prisons include not only internal changes within correctional facilities, but also increased external community support. Between 2.7 million and 3.9 million Americans live with a chronic hepatitis C, but less than 20% receive treatment for the condition. Many medically underserved patients, who are appropriate candidates for antiviral treatment, do not receive treatment for a variety of reasons, including limited or no insurance coverage and the high cost of antiviral therapy. Such access barriers are compounded by the fact that HCV is particularly prevalent in populations struggling with substance abuse problems, poverty, homelessness, mental illness, low literacy, and language issues, thereby subjecting them to mass incarceration. A study conducted at a Florida State prison concluded that the continual persistence of HIV infections and deaths related to such infections are due to unequal distribution of health care resources to inmates. Such statistics coupled with an increasing rate of incarceration only amplify the issue of HIV/HCV prevention in prisons, with the number of inmates increasing but healthcare policies remaining stagnant.

While the World Health Organization has endorsed certain preventive practices, only Vermont and Mississippi State Prisons and Los Angeles, San Francisco, New York, Philadelphia, and Washington County Jails have provided condoms to inmates. Others have argued against providing condoms because officials feel it condones sexual activity, which is illegal within the prison system.

Imprisonment as a response to US drug use has created a de facto policy of jailing more HIV-infected individuals. High-risk behavior that persists within prisons poses harm to inmates and the greater community alike, but US courts have chosen to remain silent. Separating infected individuals from the rest of the prison population has been seen as ineffective because not all infected individuals have been properly tested. That, therefore, promotes high-risk actions because there is a perceived lack of infected population.

=== Possible solutions ===
Universal screening methods have proven very effective in certain circumstances. For example, screening among blood donors has all but eliminated transmission of HIV through blood transfusions. Another example is the reduction of perinatal transmission with the introduction of routine screening for pregnant women. The benefits of introducing a routine screening program include:

- Increasing diagnosis of new cases of HIV infection;
- Preserving staff resources by streamlining the process;
- Reducing stigma associated with testing
- Potentially diagnosing HIV infection earlier for the inmate in the course of disease; and
- Improving access to HIV clinical care, medication and prevention services.

In 1996, the CDC revised its recommendations to incorporate diagnostic HIV testing and opt-out HIV screening as a part of routine clinical care in all health-care settings while also preserving the patient's option to decline HIV testing. The recommendations are intended for all health-care settings including hospital emergency departments, urgent-care clinics, inpatient services, STI clinics or other venues offering clinical STI services, tuberculosis clinics, substance abuse treatment clinics, other public health clinics, community clinics, correctional health-care facilities, and primary care settings. (The guidelines address HIV testing in health-care settings only; they do not change existing guidelines concerning targeted testing of persons at high risk for HIV who seek HIV testing in nonclinical settings such as community-based organizations, outreach settings, or mobile vans.)

The new CDC guidelines state "in all health-care settings, screening for HIV infection should be performed routinely for all patients aged 13–64 years. Health-care providers should initiate screening unless prevalence of undiagnosed HIV infection in their patients has been documented to be <0.1%. In the absence of existing data for HIV prevalence, health-care providers should initiate voluntary HIV screening until they establish that the diagnostic yield is <1 per 1,000 patients screened, at which point such screening is no longer warranted."

Additional recommendations for juveniles that are incarcerated in adult jails include the following:

- Know that incarcerated adolescents may be unaware of their rights concerning medical care, privacy, and confidentiality; therefore, it is especially important that adolescents be informed of their rights and that these rights are respected.
- Follow state or local laws that require parental consent or notification for HIV testing and/or HIV-related health-care services for minors. If required, obtain consent for testing and/or health-care services from the adolescent's parent or legal guardian prior to providing that service. Consent can be obtained directly from an emancipated minor as defined by state law.
- Inform adolescents that the medical information, including HIV test results, will not be disclosed without their consent, except as required by law.
- Inform adolescents that, as with all inmates, their HIV status will not adversely affect their medical care during incarceration or their legal rights.

Procedures for offering support to the inmate who receives a diagnosis of HIV should be in place to assure they can manage the infection. Privacy in a correctional setting is difficult, but the inmate should be assured that his medical information is confidential. The following are CDC recommended procedures for inmate support:

- Provide education to patients about HIV infection, AIDS-related symptoms, and the significance of any laboratory testing done.
- Inmates diagnosed with HIV infection may require short-term mental health support.
- Inmates with mental health conditions may require increased monitoring and intervention for these conditions.
- Inmates may be reluctant to access or possess HIV educational materials due to concerns about disclosing their HIV infection. Strategies to provide HIV education and counseling for HIV-infected inmates can include HIV educational sessions and support groups.
- Facilities should have HIV medical information and periodicals available in prison libraries and medical clinics.
- Facilities should have chronic disease management programs for HIV-infected inmates.
- Facilities should have a discharge-planning program for HIV-infected inmates.

Linking inmates to HIV care services when they are quickly released back to the community from a local jail can be difficult. Often they can be more concerned with finding a place to live or finding money to pay their legal fees. But upon giving an inmate a diagnosis of HIV, steps should be taken immediately to ensure that an appointment has been made with a provider, that contact information for a health department or community-based organization case manager is available to help them navigate the healthcare system. Several studies indicate that follow-up care for HIV positive women may correlate with a reduction in recidivism. Correctional facilities should have the following CDC recommended procedures and resources in place for inmates being discharged from custody:

- Provide a list of available agencies that provide HIV case management for released inmates.
- Provide contact information for local AIDS service organizations and the local health department.
- Assist inmates with making appointments with case manager before release from custody. If possible, arrange for the inmate to meet the case manager before release.
- Complete applications for other services following release in conjunction with the inmate.
- Provide medications if the inmate has started therapy.

=== Alternative approaches ===
The high rate of turnover in local jails as opposed to prisons may make it difficult to implement a routine testing program at intake or on a scheduled basis. In cases where testing all incoming inmates is not possible, there are alternative approaches that can be used individually or in combination with other approaches. One alternative approach could include risk-based criteria screening. The CDC recommends that jails routinely offer HIV testing to inmates who fall under one or more of the following criteria:

- Injection drug use (IDU);
- Men who have sex with men (MSM);
- Sex with an IDU, MSM, or HIV-infected partner;
- Multiple sexual partners;
- Exchange of sex for money, drugs, or other goods; and
- Diagnosis of another sexually transmitted infection.

The limitation with this screening approach is that risks are self-reported by the inmate. One study suggested that up to 42% of inmates diagnosed with HIV reported no risk factors.

A second alternative approach is clinical screening based on HCV, HBV or STI infection. The presence of any of these diseases increases the likelihood of acquiring or transmitting HIV disease. Clinical criteria for screening include:

- Pregnancy;
- A diagnosis or history of sexually or parenterally transmitted infections (e.g., HBV or HCV, syphilis, genital herpes, gonorrhea, chlamydia, trichomonas infection);
- Mycobacterium tuberculosis (MTB) infection or active TB;
- Track marks indicative of illicit drug injection;
- Signs or symptoms suggestive of HIV infection or acute retroviral syndrome.

A third alternative approach for screening in the jail setting is based on demographics such as zip code of residence, age, gender and race or ethnicity. When using this approach, providers in correctional settings should with their state or local health department to determine the demographics of HIV for their population. Criteria examples for demographic screening could include:

- Residence in low-income areas/zip codes;
- Residence in known high-HIV prevalence areas/zip codes;
- Female sex;
- Age 25–44 years; and
- Transgender identity (male to female).

There is also some evidence that screening based on type of arrest could indicate higher rates of HIV infection. For example, a study by the Department of Justice found that HIV infection is more often associated with property and drug-related crimes.

Because there is a high-volume turnover rate of inmates in the jail system, some inmates who are tested for HIV, HCV or other STIs may have been released before receiving their results. Correctional facilities should assure that all cases of newly diagnosed infectious diseases are reported to the state or local health department for assistance with notification of results, counseling, partner services and linkage to care. The CDC advocates a syndemic approach to intervene in the transmission of HIV, HCV and other STIs. This approach includes "combining services to minimize missed opportunities" to detect disease. This approach calls for a collaborative effort between agencies to address high incarceration rates and other social justice issues such as poverty.

Possible HCV prevention techniques have included vaccinations, methadone treatments for drug addicts, access to sterile syringes and needles, use of proper cleaning materials for syringes and needles, lowering the prison population, improving healthcare within prisons, increased availability of condoms, psychological therapy or counseling, or educational classes on drug use and sexual behavior for both inmates and prison staff. Some prisons already provide prevention techniques such as bleach tablets for cleaning, drug counseling, detoxification, and drug behavior management, but these techniques are not fully effective.

While vaccination programs are accepted, they are not widely implemented. Substance abuse programs are also rare, though HIV and HCV testing are widely available. Because of the ineffectiveness of some preventive techniques, advocates push for alternative forms of rehabilitation for drug offenders to keep these potentially infected people outside of the prison system. These techniques do not only apply to HIV and HCV prevention, but also address the various other diseases present within correctional facilities. Since prevention of any infectious diseases presents a major unsolved problem, public healthcare professionals advocate for a more inclusive and all-encompassing approach.

Due to the high rate of HIV that exists within prisons and the carceral system, these sites are crucial in educating individuals for further infection. The National Commission on Correctional Health Care conducted a study evaluating current modes of handling HIV through prevention programs across the US. In particular, one of the researchers explored peer education in the forms of curriculum modeled after the American Red Cross and California's "Reach One, Teach One" program. By discussing methods in which infected individuals can be educated, the spread of infectious diseases can be reduced by an appreciable margin.

Although there is near consensus in the literature about what needs to be done to reduce the incidence of sexual violence in prisons, to date, little if any research has been undertaken to assess which strategies are most effective. In addition to evaluating the various components of policies and programs to address sexual violence, prison systems have not allowed external, independent researchers to carry out, at regular intervals, a comprehensive review and analysis of the incidence of rape and other forms of sexual violence in their prisons. Additionally, victims of sexual assault in prison do not have access to post-exposure prophylaxis (PEP), which could reduce the risk for HIV transmission after exposure to HIV.

== Post-treatment for HCV ==
Treatment after being released from prison can be difficult because individuals must locate facilities that can provide them treatment while considering their social status, limited knowledge, and access to these resources. Hepatitis C has been one of the most widespread blood-borne infection to date within the United States. From 2005 to 2006, the state of New York began implementing the Hepatitis C Continuity Program, offering free HCV treatment for inmates even after release from its state prisons. The program encompassed 70 prisons and 21 health-care facilities. This program was put together by the collaborative efforts of New York State Department of Correctional Services, New York State Department of Health, New York State Division of Parole, New York City Health and Hospitals Corporation, and other community-based health care providers. Together, these organizations addressed the immediate need for medication upon release from prison. Inmates were given proper medication provided they possess Medicaid or any other kind of health insurance and eligibility. This program also included a facility referral system, making it easier for inmates to find the most convenient treatment location for them.

Past statistics show that the majority of inmates (60.1%) that participated in the Hepatitis C Continuity Program come from and return to New York City, 10.4% from suburban NYC counties, 16.6% from upstate counties, and the remaining 12.8% from rural counties. About 87.1% of releases have been treated for HCV by this program during their time in prison. The inmates that qualify for this program meet with staff from the Department of Correctional Services's Health Services and receive information about this opportunity. After going through paperwork regarding release of medical information to hospitals, the Department of Parole, and the Department of Health AIDS Institute, and Medicaid eligibility, the inmates are referred to facilities based on release and type of treatment required. Facilities use the inmates' HCV testing history, genotype, HCV treatment, HIV status and, if HIV infected, most recent CD4/T-Helper cell count and viral load and discharge information to determine the most suitable treatment.

== CDC definitions ==
- Diagnostic testing: Performing an HIV test for persons with clinical signs or symptoms consistent with HIV infection.
- HIV-prevention counseling: An interactive process of assessing risk, recognizing specific behaviors that increase the risk for acquiring or transmitting HIV, and developing a plan to take specific steps to reduce risks.
- Informed consent: A process of communication between patient and provider through which an informed patient can choose whether to undergo HIV testing or decline to do so. Elements of informed consent typically include providing oral or written information regarding HIV, the risks and benefits of testing, the implications of HIV test results, how test results will be communicated, and the opportunity to ask questions.
- Inmate: A person incarcerated in a local jail, state prison, federal prison, or a private facility under contract to federal, state, or local authorities.
- Jail: A confinement facility usually administered by a local law enforcement agency that is intended for adults, but sometimes holds juveniles, for confinement before and after adjudication. Such facilities include jails and city or county correctional centers; special jail facilities, such as medical treatment or release centers; halfway houses; work farms; and temporary holding or lockup facilities that are part of the jail's combined function. Inmates sentenced to jail facilities usually have a sentence of 1 year or less. Alaska, Connecticut, Delaware, Hawaii, Rhode Island, and Vermont operate integrated systems, which combine prisons and jails.
- Opt-out screening: Performing HIV screening after notifying the patient that 1) the test will be performed and 2) the patient may elect to decline or defer testing. Assent is inferred unless the patient declines testing.
- Prison: A long-term confinement facility, run by a state or the federal government, that typically holds felons and offenders with sentences of more than 1 year. However, sentence length may vary by state. Alaska, Connecticut, Delaware, Hawaii, Rhode Island, and Vermont operate integrated systems, which combine prisons and jails.
- Screening: Performing an HIV test for all persons in a defined population without regard to the individual's characteristics.
- Targeted testing: Performing an HIV test for subpopulations of persons at higher risk, typically defined on the basis of behavior, clinical, or demographic characteristics.

== See also ==
- Criminal transmission of HIV in the United States
- Organ donation in the United States prison population
- Incarceration of women in the United States § Healthcare
- Prison–industrial complex
- Incarceration in the United States
- War on drugs § Arrests and incarceration
- List of U.S. state prisons
