= Pin prick attack =

Type of assault using a needle or syringe

A pin prick attack is an assault on another person with a needle or syringe tainted with the blood of somebody carrying a blood-borne disease, such as HIV. Although there have been numerous cases of people being attacked with needles and syringes, the idea that people infected with AIDS have deliberately attempted to infect others in this manner is generally considered an urban legend. Real cases of infection of HIV in this manner were typically taken from infected victims rather than from infected attackers.

== Origins ==
Although tales of so-called "needle men" or white slavers, who supposedly injected unsuspecting young girls with morphine before carrying them away into a life of prostitution, had been around since the 1930s, the specific case of infection with blood borne diseases might have had its roots in a 1989 incident where ten teenage girls were arrested and later charged with stabbing numerous women with pins on the Upper West Side of Manhattan in New York City.

== As an email/Internet scare story ==
The rise of the Internet in the 1990s led to the rise of numerous urban legends concerning the pin prick attack, which could be quickly spread via email and discussion forums and which soon assumed a standardized form. The email would take the form of a warning to others that a young person had been visiting a cinema or a night club when the person felt a slight prick on his or her arm. Not taking any notice, the person would carry on with his or her leisure activity, and it was only later that the person would find stuck to his or her clothes or in his or her pocket a badge or sticker carrying the slogan "welcome to the AIDS club", followed a few months later with a positive HIV test. These rumors bear similarities to the so-called AIDS Mary legends of the 1980s, whereby a man would enjoy a one-night stand with a stranger at his house and awaken the next morning to find the stranger gone and the words "Welcome to the AIDS Club" written in red lipstick on his bathroom mirror. However, the American Centers for Disease Control has stressed on numerous occasions that it has yet to confirm a single case of HIV as being transmitted in this fashion and has dismissed such emails as a hoax.

The hoax was re-emerged in 2017 through social media, claiming that members of Islamic State (often mistranslated to "The Islamic Cult") are supposedly posing as doctors, moving from house to house in order to conduct "insulin checkup" while injecting them with HIV. The re-emergence of the hoax was documented in places like India, Israel, The Philippines and the U.S.

== Documented examples ==
In 1933, a pin prick attack led to the death of Indian man Amarendra Pandey from plague.

A pin prick attack leading to the deliberate transmission of HIV occurred at the Long Bay Jail in Sydney on July 22, 1990, when prison officer Geoffrey Pearce was attacked by HIV-infected prisoner Graham Farlow, who stabbed him with a syringe full of his own infected blood. Despite immediate medical attention and the "one in 200" chance of being infected, Pearce tested positive for the disease a few months later, and died of an AIDS related illness in 1997 at age 28.

In 1992, Brryan Jackson was injected with a syringe of HIV-infected blood by his father. Jackson was diagnosed with AIDS that same year.

In 1998, Richard J. Schmidt, a physician in Lafayette, Louisiana, was convicted of attempted murder after injecting a former lover, Janice Trahan, with HIV and Hepatitis C-tainted blood, claiming to be giving her a vitamin shot. Trahan developed both Hep-C and HIV as a result.

== See also ==
- Criminal transmission of HIV – Intentional or reckless infection of a person with the human immunodeficiency virus
- Needle spiking – Act of secretly injecting people with sedative drugs
- Needlestick injury – Accidental puncture of skin causing contamination
