= Aidsmap =

UK website

- Formation: 1987
- Founder: Peter Scott
- Purpose: Independent, accurate & accessible information about HIV
- Headquarters: United Kingdom
- Executive Director: Matthew Hodson (to 2024)
- Website: www.aidsmap.com
- Formerly called: National Aids Manual

Aidsmap is a website which publishes independent, accurate and accessible information and news about HIV and AIDS. The aidsmap website was run by a charity based in the United Kingdom, NAM aidsmap. The charity closed in July 2024 due to challenges securing funding but announced in March 2025 that, thanks to support from Terrence Higgins Trust, the site would "be continuing its news reporting from international HIV conferences and elsewhere so that expert patients, advocates and clinicians have access to the latest research".

"NAM" originally stood for National AIDS Manual and referred to a 1987 compendium of all information about HIV published for non-scientists in England. When NAM became an international organisation with the introduction of its aidsmap website, 'NAM' was no longer used as an acronym and there was no longer any particular "aids manual" being maintained.

Aidsmap's vision is of a world where HIV is no longer a threat to health or happiness.

== Timeline of work ==
NAM was founded in 1987 by Peter Scott, who was then working for the London Lesbian and Gay Switchboard. He was seeking to address the public's demand for a source of information about HIV.

Subsequent Directors were Will Anderson (to 1996), Colin Nee (1996–2001), Caspar Thomson (2001–2016) and Matthew Hodson (2016–2024).

In 1992 the organisation began publishing the newsletter called the HIV Treatment Update, which was designed to give patients the information they needed to help direct their choices for HIV treatment.

In 1998 aidsmap.com was launched as an online resource for all printed materials. It was a partnership project involving NAM and the British HIV Association, and later the International HIV/AIDS Alliance. The original site's senior editors were Edward King and Keith Alcorn. From 2018 to 2024, the managing editor was Roger Pebody.

In 2006 aidsmap.com was awarded first prize in the Patient Information Website category of the 2006 British Medical Association's Medical Books Competition.

In 2019, NAM aidsmap launched its new website after a major redevelopment project.

In December 2019, aidsmapLIVE, an HIV information series broadcast on NAM aidsmap's social media channels, won both the Innovation and Media award at the nOscars, hosted by Naz Project London.

In 2024, NAM aidsmap faced a funding crisis and was forced to close. In response, Winnie Byanyima, the Executive Director of the Joint United Nations Programme on HIV/AIDS (UNAIDS) paid tribute to the organisation's work. "You have been a trusted source and resource for people living with HIV and everyone in the global HIV response. You leave an exceptional legacy." Byanyima said. The International AIDS Society also stated that the closure of the service would leave a significant void: "NAM has consistently delivered unparalleled commentary and coverage of critical HIV-related news. It is now more imperative than ever for all stakeholders in the HIV response to intensify our efforts to fill this significant void." they said.

In March 2025, it was announced that, thanks to support from Terrence Higgins Trust, aidsmap would "be continuing its news reporting from international HIV conferences and elsewhere so that expert patients, advocates and clinicians have access to the latest research", starting with the 2025 Conference on Retroviruses and Opportunistic Infections on 9–13 March in San Francisco.
