= Thomas Guerra =

American landscape architect (born 1985)

- Born: February 23, 1985 (age 41); Delano, California, U.S.
- Occupation: landscape architect

Thomas Miguel Guerra (born February 23, 1985), also known as Ashton Lucian Chavez and Tomii Guerra, is an American landscape architect who became the first person in the state of California to be convicted for intentionally infecting another individual with HIV. In 2015 prosecutors in the San Diego County Superior Court presented 11,000 text messages and 36 audio clips to support their case against Guerra. Since then, Guerra has been accused of intentionally exposing dozens of other men to HIV. Guerra is the great-nephew of labor leader and civil rights activist Cesar Chavez.

== HIV exposure conviction ==
Guerra's ex-boyfriend filed a complaint against him with San Diego police in August, 2013.

On March 9, 2015, Guerra pleaded no contest to a misdemeanor charge of violating a California health code by failing to tell his former partner he was HIV positive. Guerra had previously pled not guilty and changed his plea the morning his trial was set to begin. According to San Diego City Attorney Jan Goldsmith, Guerra's case was the first prosecution of willful HIV transmission in San Diego. There had also been no previous successful prosecutions across the state since the California Legislature adopted the health statute in 1995.

Additional victims came forward after the case received media publicity; they filed cases in various California cities stating that Guerra had lied to them about being HIV-negative. Some of those cases are still pending. Investigators found 11,000 text messages and videos in which Guerra laughed about lying to sexual partners about his HIV status. "Yay lol. Someone getting poz that day," Guerra texted to a friend. "Poor Sucka." On May 5, 2015, Guerra was sentenced to six months in jail.

Despite pressure to file the case as a felony, which would have carried a term of up to eight years in prison, San Diego District Attorney Bonnie Dumanis had twice declined to do so. At his sentencing hearing, Guerra told Judge Lewis that he had "no remorse" for his actions. He blamed the victim, who he said was "reckless" because they had met on the gay dating site Grindr.

Judge Lewis said she would have liked to have given Guerra a harsher sentence, but California statutes prevented her doing so: "I don't think in my 25-plus years in law, I've ever seen somebody be so lacking of insight, blame or responsibility that you have demonstrated," she stated to Guerra before sentencing him to the maximum allowed per California statue, 6 months in jail. San Diego City Attorney Jan Goldsmith said in a statement that the sentence "was inadequate given the damage done to the victim and the danger to the public posed by [Guerra]."
