= AIDS Drug Assistance Programs =

AIDS Drug Assistance Programs are a set of programs in all 50 states in the United States that provide Food and Drug Administration-approved HIV treatment drugs to low income patients in the U.S.

The programs are administered by each state with funds distributed by the United States government.

In June 2007 the program provided coverage for 102,000 or 30% of those infected with HIV in the United States. Drug expenditures were $100.1 million in 2007 and $8.8 million in money spent on helping with insurance payments. This represented 344,600 prescriptions.

The total program budget is $1.4 Billion with California receiving $288 Million, New York $241 Million, Texas $101 Million, and Florida $97 Million.

The program first began in 1987 with appropriations to help pay for AZT. The program was expanded in 1990 with the Ryan White Comprehensive AIDS Resources Emergency (CARE) Act (commonly referred to as the Ryan White Care Act.

Most recipients are below 200% of the Federal Poverty Level (FPL) and 43 percent are below 100% the FPL. 63% are black or hispanic and 77% are male.

In 2010, some states, citing budgetary reasons began cutbacks to the ADAP Formulary or instituted waiting lists for medication. A controversial dialogue began in states like Florida as to how these cutbacks would affect lower income persons with HIV and whether the lack of funds should be blamed on the federal government or the state legislatures.

== Client Eligibility ==
Client eligibility is determined by the state and territory and includes financial and medical eligibility criteria. Financial eligibility is usually determined as a percentage of the Federal Poverty Level. Medical eligibility is a diagnosis of HIV.

- Clients must provide proof of current state residency.
- ADAPs are required to recertify client eligibility every six months and must meet HRSA's minimum requirements for recertification.

== Income Eligibility Requirements ==
Like Medicaid, ADAP is a federally-funded, state-administered program, meaning that each state determines various aspects of the program in addition to any federal requirements. This includes income requirements.

As of November 2023, the majority of U.S. states (n=27) have income eligibility limits set at 500% of the Federal Poverty Level (FPL).

The state of Texas and the U.S. Territory of Puerto Rico have the strictest income requirements that restrict eligibility to patients making no more than 200% of the FPL).

== Waiting Lists ==
Throughout most of the 2000s, state Ryan White HIV/AIDS Program (RWHAP) Part B programs — ADAPs — were forced to place financially eligible Persons Living with HIV/AIDS (PLWHA) on waiting lists to receive financial assistance to afford medications to treat HIV. These waiting lists were largely the result of insufficient funding to keep up with the demand for ADAP services by new potential patients through the congressional appropriations process through which state ADAP programs are funded.

Unlike entitlement programs such as Medicaid, the state ADAP programs are funded as discretionary grant programs. This means that Congress chooses a portion of the RWHAP Part B appropriation for the ADAP base. The amount that each state receives is determined by the Health Resources and Services Administration through the use of a funding formula that takes into account the number of PLWHA in the state or territory in the most recent calendar year.

During the 2000s, states and territories across the United States were forced to develop waiting lists that ranged from as few as 1 person to as many as hundreds of people. Other states closed registration to new applicants or instituted state-level eligibility guidelines beyond those required by HRSA. PLWHA who were financially eligible to receive assistance from state ADAP programs found themselves unable to receive them, forcing delays in care and treatment.

These treatment delays likely contributed to the 2006 deaths of at least three PLWHA who were on South Carolina's ADAP waiting list, the announcement of which led to nationwide calls for the appropriation of emergency funds and increased overall appropriations to end waiting lists.

By 2017, ADAP waiting lists were all but eliminated as a result of reprogrammed funding from other parts of the RWHAP and separate Congressional emergency funding allocations between 2010 and 2013.

In April 2026, the National Alliance of State and Territorial AIDS Directors (NASTAD) reported that two states—Iowa and Utah—became the first states to implement waiting lists in over a decade, impacting 1,116 patients (1,106 in Iowa and 10 in Utah)
