= Nushawn Williams =

American convicted sex offender

- Born: November 1, 1976 (age 49); Brooklyn, New York
- Other name: Shyteek Johnson

Nushawn Williams (born November 1, 1976), also known as Shyteek Johnson, is an American convicted sex offender who admitted in 1997 to having unprotected sex with numerous girls and women after having been told that he was HIV positive. New York state and local public health officials stated that Williams had sex with up to 47 women in Chautauqua County and 50–75 in New York City. Williams said in a news interview that his actual number of sexual partners was up to 300.

== Case history ==
Williams, a native of Brooklyn, led a life of crime since his childhood. The son of a drug-addicted mother, Williams dealt drugs and robbed from the elderly. Prior to his HIV-related conviction, he had three previous convictions for various street crimes. He used several aliases, including the name Shyteek Johnson, under which he was jailed for a drug offense before he faced the HIV transmission charges.

Numerous reports indicate that Williams was a crack dealer who bragged of his gang-related activities and had a history of violence against women, including many of the women he infected. Williams' braggadocio and violence belied the ease with which he attracted women of all races and socioeconomic classes, though most of his victims were those with socioeconomic or emotional problems. News reports make numerous mentions of his charming interpersonal style with women. Women quoted in news stories often pointed to Williams' ability to make them feel special and loved, even while exercising violent control over their actions. In the case of his youngest victim, who was 13, Williams reportedly pursued a relationship for several months.

Williams stated that he believed health officials had lied to him when they informed him of his HIV status in 1996. He was arrested on drug charges in September 1997.

He was the primary cause of an HIV micro-epidemic in Chautauqua County. He infected at least 14 women in Chautauqua County with HIV, including numerous teenagers. In 1999, he pleaded guilty to two counts of statutory rape (two of his victims were underage) and one count of reckless endangerment in the first degree for having unprotected sex with a woman who did not know his HIV status. He received a four-to-12-year sentence. Two of Williams' children in Chautauqua County were born with HIV, raising the number of known cases linked to Williams to 16. Many of these women continued to have unprotected sex after their diagnosis, spreading the disease to new boyfriends. An additional 10 of Williams's sexual partners in New York City have been found to be HIV-positive, though it is unclear if Williams is the source of these infections, since the city's population makes it harder to track.

== Case impact ==
His case received widespread media attention and ignited a debate over whether knowingly spreading HIV could be viewed as a crime as well as debates over the promiscuous sexuality of U.S. culture and the role of sex education in American high schools. Many stated that the maximum sentence Williams could receive was unduly light, leading then-New York City mayor Rudy Giuliani to call for Williams to be tried for "attempted murder, or worse."

The case also raised questions as to whether the state should continue to respect the anonymity of those who test positive for HIV. Prior to the Williams case, health officials believed that publicizing the names of HIV-positive individuals would result in a reduction in HIV testing and subject HIV-positive individuals, particularly members of the gay community, to increased social stigma.

As a result of the Williams case, New York passed a law that mandated doctors and laboratories to report the names of individuals who test positive for HIV. Reporting of partners to physicians is voluntary, but doctors are mandated to report the names of any known partners to the NYS Department of Health. Partners may be notified without the permission of the patient, but the patient must be informed that their partners will be notified.

== Continued imprisonment ==
In April 2010, New York attorney general Andrew Cuomo moved to block Williams' release from prison after 12 years and place him under civil confinement under a statute aimed at predatory sex offenders. A judge ordered him remanded to custody pending an outcome of a civil proceeding. By 2010, he had adopted the name Shyteek Johnson again.

As of 2020, he remains in civil commitment under Article 10 of New York's Mental Hygiene Law.
