= Ryan White CARE Act =

U.S. Act to improve care for individuals and families affected by HIV

Ryan White Comprehensive AIDS Resources Emergency Act of 1990
- Long title: An Act to amend the Public Health Service Act to provide grants to improve the quality and availability of care for individuals and families affected by HIV, and for other purposes.
- Nicknames: AIDS Prevention Act of 1990; Ryan White Care Act
- Enacted by: the 101st United States Congress
- Effective: August 18, 1990

Citations
- Public law: 101-381
- Statutes at Large: 104 Stat. 576

Codification
- Titles amended: 42 U.S.C.: Public Health and Social Welfare
- U.S.C. sections created: 42 U.S.C. ch. 6A, subch. XXIV § 300ff et seq.
- U.S.C. sections amended: 42 U.S.C. ch. 6A, subch. XXIII § 300ee et seq.

Legislative history
- Introduced in the Senate as S. 2240 by Ted Kennedy (D–MA) on March 6, 1990; Committee consideration by Senate Labor and Human Resources; Passed the Senate on May 16, 1990 (95-4); Passed the House on June 13, 1990 (passed voice vote); Reported by the joint conference committee on July 31, 1990; agreed to by the House on August 4, 1990 (passed voice vote) and by the Senate on August 4, 1990 (passed voice vote); Signed into law by President George H. W. Bush on August 18, 1990

The Ryan White Comprehensive AIDS Resources Emergency Act (Ryan White CARE Act, Pub. L. 101–381, 104 Stat. 576, enacted August 18, 1990) was an act of the United States Congress and is the largest federally funded program in the United States for people living with HIV/AIDS. The act made federal funding available through contingency grants to states for low-income, uninsured, and under-insured people to be treated with the chemotherapeutic drug AZT. The act is named in honor of Ryan White, an Indiana teenager who contracted HIV through a tainted blood transfusion. He was diagnosed with AIDS in 1984 at age 13 and was subsequently expelled from school because of the disease. White became a well-known advocate for AIDS research and awareness until his death in 1990 at age 18.

Ryan White programs are "payer of last resort" which fund treatment when no other resources are available. As AIDS has spread, the funding of the program has increased. In 1991, the first year funds were appropriated, around US$220 million were spent; by the early 2000s, this number had almost increased 10-fold. The Act was reauthorized in 1996, 2000, 2006, and 2009. The program provides some level of care for around 500,000 people a year and, in 2004, provided funds to 2,567 organizations. The Ryan White programs also fund local and state primary medical care providers, support services, healthcare provider training programs, and provide technical assistance to such organizations.

In fiscal year 2005, federal funding for the Ryan White CARE Act was $2.1 billion. As of 2005, roughly one-third of this money went to the AIDS Drug Assistance Programs (ADAP) which provides drugs for 30 percent of people living with HIV. The primary activity of ADAP is providing FDA-approved prescription medication. The Ryan White CARE Act mandates that EMS personnel can find out whether they were exposed to life-threatening diseases while providing care. (This notification provision was included in the original 1990 act, dropped in the 2006 reauthorization, and reinstated in the 2008 reauthorization).

By one estimate, the Ryan White CARE Act saved the lives of 57,000 people through 2018. The cost of each avoided HIV/AIDS death was $334,000.

== Waiting lists ==
Throughout most of the 2000s, state Ryan White HIV/AIDS Program (RWHAP) Part B programs — ADAPs — were forced to place financially eligible Persons Living with HIV/AIDS (PLWHA) on waiting lists to receive financial assistance to afford medications to treat HIV. These waiting lists were largely the result of insufficient funding to keep up with the demand for ADAP services by new potential patients through the congressional appropriations process through which state ADAP programs are funded.

Unlike entitlement programs such as Medicaid, the state ADAP programs are funded as discretionary grant programs. This means that Congress chooses a portion of the RWHAP Part B appropriation for the ADAP base. The amount that each state receives is determined by the Health Resources and Services Administration through the use of a funding formula that takes into account the number of PLWHA in the state or territory in the most recent calendar year.

During the 2000s, states and territories across the United States were forced to develop waiting lists that ranged from as few as 1 person to as many as hundreds of people. Other states closed registration to new applicants or instituted state-level eligibility guidelines beyond those required by HRSA. PLWHA who were financially eligible to receive assistance from state ADAP programs found themselves unable to receive them, forcing delays in care and treatment.

These treatment delays likely contributed to the 2006 deaths of at least three PLWHA who were on South Carolina's ADAP waiting list, the announcement of which led to nationwide calls for the appropriation of emergency funds and increased overall appropriations to end waiting lists.

By 2017, ADAP waiting lists were all but been eliminated as a result of reprogrammed funding from other parts of the RWHAP and separate Congressional emergency funding allocations between 2010 and 2013.

== 2006 reauthorization ==
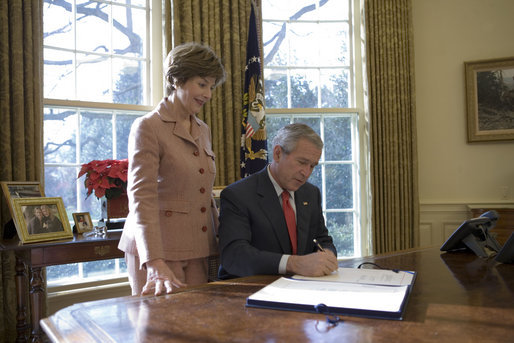
President Bush signs the Ryan White HIV/AIDS Treatment Modernization Act of 2006, in the Oval Office, December 19, 2006.

The Ryan White Care Act was due to be reauthorized at the end of 2005, but Congress could not reach agreement on changes, and the act was extended for one year under the old terms. Then, in 2006, the act was reauthorized for three more years, ending on September 30, 2009 with a funding level of $2.1 billion. Prior to the reauthorization, the act allocated money based on the proportion of patients with AIDS in each region. The 2006 reauthorization changed this allocation mechanism to also consider the number of people living with HIV who do not have a clinical diagnosis of AIDS

A significant portion of funding from the act is emergency relief for Eligible Metropolitan Areas. The 2006 reauthorization redefined EMAs as cities with a population greater than 50,000, instead of previous versions which required 500,000.

== 2009 reauthorization ==
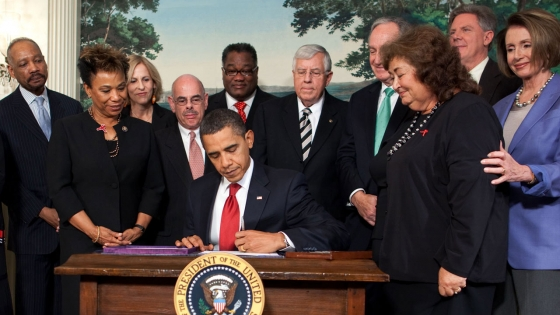
President Obama signs the Ryan White HIV/AIDS Treatment Extension Act of 2009.

In 2009, Congress passed the Ryan White HIV/AIDS Treatment Extension Act, which was signed by President Obama on October 30, 2009. This bill extends the Ryan White Care Act for an additional four years.

== 2013 expiration ==
In 2013, the Ryan White CARE Act expired; however the Program remains as Congress continues to appropriate funding.

== Special Projects of National Significance ==
The Special Projects of National Significance (often abbreviated to SPNS) program is a United States Department of Health program that helps to "advance knowledge and skills in the health and support services to underserved populations diagnosed with HIV infection." The current SPNS effort began in 1991 with several federal grants; portfolio of 72 grants currently address issues in HIV care.
