= COVID-19 pandemic in New Mexico =

Ongoing COVID-19 viral pandemic in New Mexico, United States

- Disease: COVID-19
- Pathogen: SARS-CoV-2
- Location: New Mexico, U.S.
- First outbreak: Wuhan, Hubei, China (Global)
- Index case: Socorro County, Bernalillo County
- Arrival date: March 11, 2020
- Confirmed cases: 681,525
- Hospitalized cases: 65 (current); 34,276 (cumulative)
- Recovered: 660,313
- Deaths: 9,236

Government website
- cv.nmhealth.org

The COVID-19 pandemic was confirmed to have reached the U.S. state of New Mexico on March 11, 2020. On December 23, 2020, the New Mexico Department of Health reported 1,174 new COVID-19 cases and 40 deaths, bringing the cumulative statewide totals to 133,242 cases and 2,243 deaths since the start of the pandemic. During the last quarter of 2020, COVID-19 hospitalizations in New Mexico increased, reaching a peak of 947 hospitalizations on December 3.

The most populous counties in the state have seen the largest number of infections, but by mid-April, the northwest counties of McKinley and San Juan became the most infected areas in the state, with Sandoval County also seeing a high infection rate. All of these counties have large Native American populations. According to the state's data dashboard, American Indians had nearly 58 percent of the statewide infection rates as of May 15. On April 25, McKinley County had the highest total number of cases while San Juan County had the highest number of deaths by April 26. However, by the end of July, Hispanics/Latinos had a plurality of cases. The portion of cases among American Indians continued to decline, and by mid February 2021 was below that of whites.

== Timeline ==
COVID-19 pandemic medical cases in New Mexico by county
| County (Note: County where individuals with a positive case reside. Location of diagnosis and treatment may vary.) | Cases (Note: Reported confirmed and presumptive cases. Actual case numbers are probably higher.) (Note: Includes 108 cases from unknown counties.) | Deaths | Vaccine | Population (Note: July 2019 population estimate from "U.S. Census Bureau Quick Facts: New Mexico". United States Census Bureau.) | Cases / 100k |
|---|---|---|---|---|---|
| 33 / 33 | 681,525 | 9,236 | 1,289,397 | 2,096,829 | 32,502.7 |
| Bernalillo | 200,979 | 2,320 | 431,191 | 679,121 | 29,594.0 |
| Catron | 534 | 23 | 1,512 | 3,527 | 15,140.3 |
| Chaves | 25,208 (Note: Includes 380 incarcerated cases.) | 365 | 27,247 | 64,615 | 39,012.6 |
| Cibola | 10,549 (Note: Includes 550 federal and 190+129 state incarcerated cases.) | 218 | 16,659 | 26,675 | 39,546.4 |
| Colfax | 3,182 (Note: Includes 312 incarcerated cases.) | 73 | 7,083 | 11,941 | 26,647.7 |
| Curry | 15,566 | 236 | 19,173 | 48,954 | 31,797.2 |
| De Baca | 769 | 6 | 809 | 1,748 | 43,993.1 |
| Doña Ana | 77,857 (Note: Includes 302 incarcerated cases.) | 952 | 143,272 | 218,195 | 35,682.3 |
| Eddy | 19,409 | 329 | 25,196 | 58,460 | 33,200.5 |
| Grant | 10,045 | 119 | 17,141 | 26,998 | 37,206.5 |
| Guadalupe | 1,755 (Note: Includes 372 incarcerated cases.) | 18 | 2,669 | 4,300 | 40,814.0 |
| Harding | 104 | 4 | 297 | 625 | 16,640.0 |
| Hidalgo | 1,353 | 18 | 2,264 | 4,198 | 32,229.6 |
| Lea | 24,068 (Note: Includes 912 incarcerated cases.) | 413 | 29,765 | 71,070 | 33,865.2 |
| Lincoln | 6,669 | 77 | 10,496 | 19,572 | 34,074.2 |
| Los Alamos | 4,600 | 26 | 14,457 | 19,369 | 23,749.3 |
| Luna | 8,114 | 154 | 16,053 | 23,709 | 34,223.3 |
| McKinley | 34,303 | 667 | 53,631 | 71,367 | 48,065.6 |
| Mora | 1,000 | 22 | 2,690 | 4,521 | 22,119.0 |
| Otero | 19,813 (Note: Includes 649 federal, 1,319 ICE, and 594 state incarcerated cases.) | 232 | 27,715 | 67,490 | 29,356.9 |
| Quay | 2,617 | 70 | 3,702 | 8,253 | 31,709.7 |
| Rio Arriba | 13,636 | 170 | 27,419 | 38,921 | 35,035.1 |
| Roosevelt | 6,286 | 112 | 6,859 | 18,500 | 33,978.4 |
| San Juan | 53,406 | 871 | 82,749 | 123,958 | 43,083.9 |
| San Miguel | 7,778 | 92 | 16,926 | 27,277 | 28,514.9 |
| Sandoval | 45,886 | 522 | 97,816 | 146,748 | 31,268.6 |
| Santa Fe | 41,201 (Note: Includes 276 incarcerated cases.) | 410 | 111,776 | 150,358 | 27,401.9 |
| Sierra | 2,512 | 89 | 6,812 | 10,791 | 23,278.7 |
| Socorro | 4,816 | 102 | 9,740 | 16,637 | 28,947.5 |
| Taos | 7,346 | 111 | 24,529 | 32,723 | 22,449.0 |
| Torrance | 3,904 (Note: Includes 533 incarcerated cases.) | 63 | 6,507 | 15,461 | 25,250.6 |
| Union | 1,183 (Note: Includes 220 incarcerated cases.) | 19 | 1,846 | 4,059 | 29,145.1 |
| Valencia | 24,969 (Note: Includes 502 incarcerated cases.) | 333 | 43,396 | 76,688 | 32,559.2 |
Final update May 11, 2023; Vaccinations updated April 25, 2023; Data is publicly reported by New Mexico Department of Health

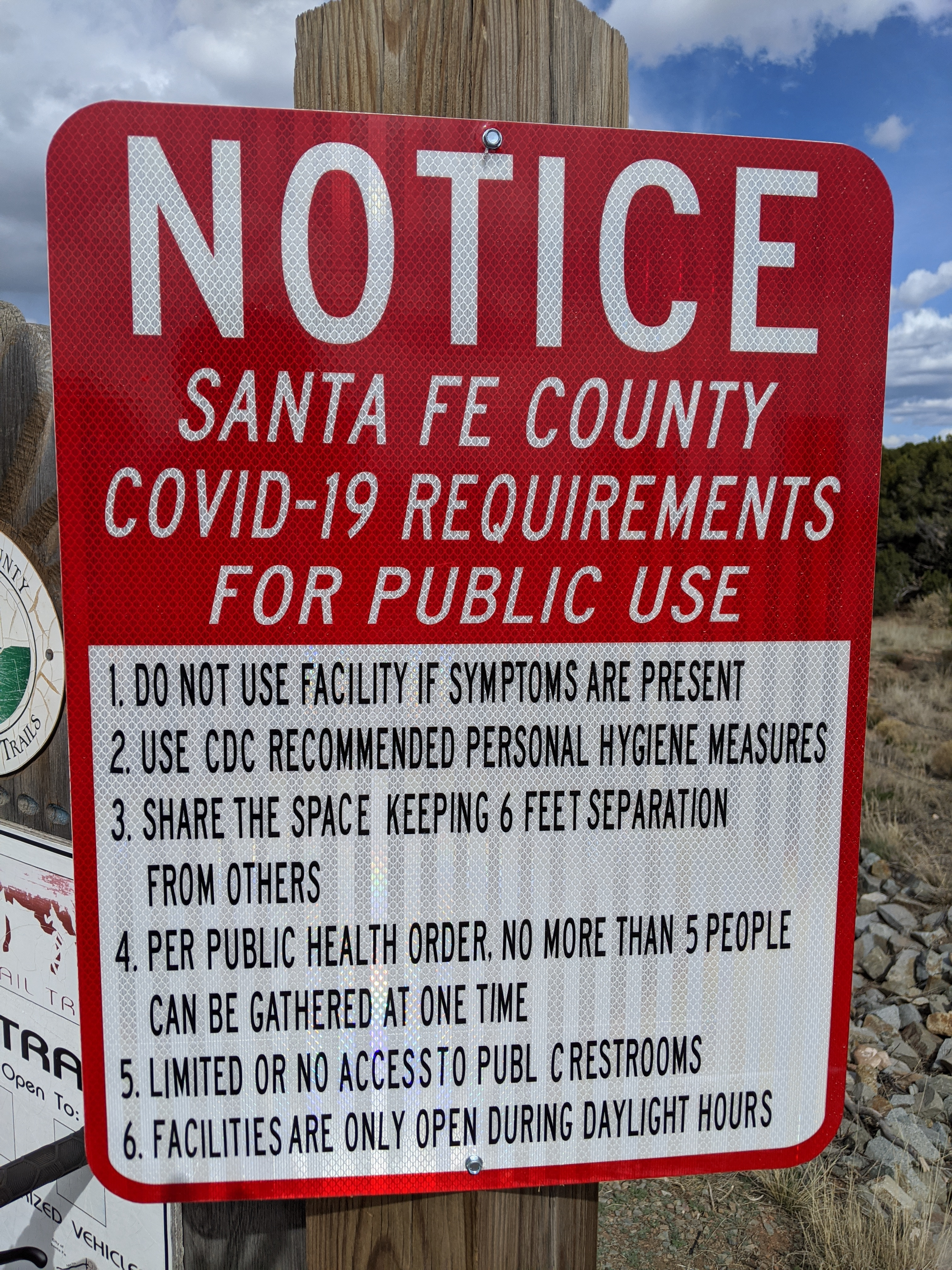
Trailhead sign in Santa Fe County

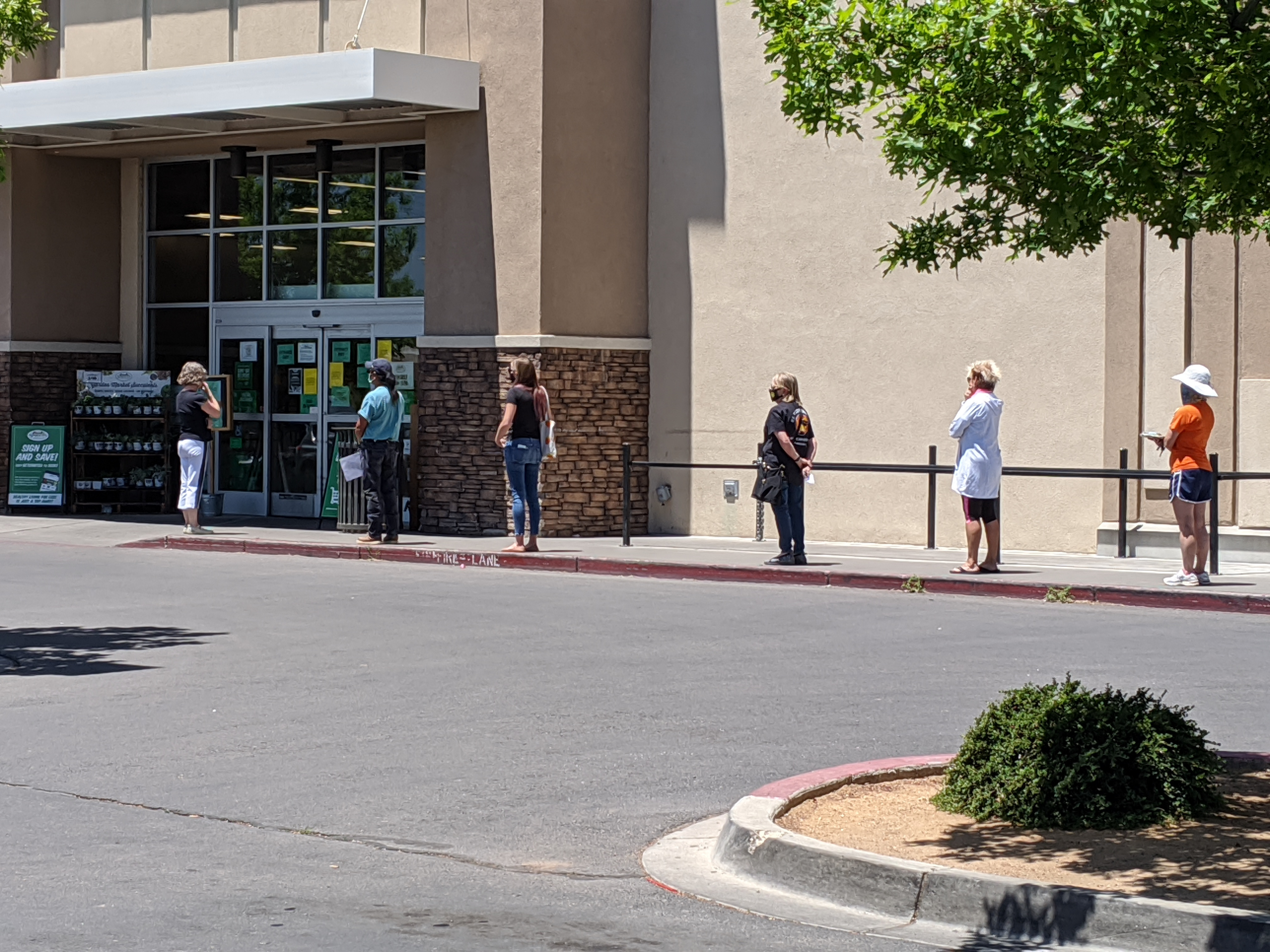
Social distancing while waiting in line outside Grocery store

=== March 2020 ===
- March 11: The initial four cases of COVID-19 in New Mexico were reported by the New Mexico Department of Health. They included a couple in their 60s in Socorro County with a travel history to Egypt, a woman in her 70s in Bernalillo County with a travel history to the New York City area, and a Santa Fe County woman in her 60s also with a New York City area travel history. Governor Michelle Lujan Grisham and the Department of Health cautioned against large gatherings and non-essential travel outside of New Mexico. Governor Lujan Grisham signed Executive Order 2020–004, declaring a statewide public health emergency.
- March 12: Two more cases were confirmed. These were a Bernalillo County man in his 40s and a Santa Fe County woman in her 50s who had travelled to Italy.
- March 13: Four more cases were confirmed. These included Bernalillo County men in their 50s and 80s and a Bernalillo County woman in her 70s, all with contact to previously diagnosed patients, as well as a Santa Fe County woman in her 20s who had travelled to New York. Governor Lujan Grisham announces all K-12 public schools will close for three weeks starting March 16, 2020.
- March 14: Three more cases were confirmed. The patients included one Sandoval County man and one woman, both in their 60s, and a Bernalillo county woman in her 50s.
- March 15: Four more cases were confirmed. The new patients were all men from Bernalillo County: one each in their 20s and 40s, and two in their 30s.
- March 16: Four more cases were confirmed. They were all from Bernalillo County: one man in his 20s, two women in their 30s, and one man in his 80s.
- March 17: Two more cases were confirmed. Two men were diagnosed, one in his 40s in Santa Fe County and one in his 50s in Taos County.
- March 18: Five more cases were confirmed. They included a woman in her 40s in Bernalillo County, a woman in her 80s in Bernalillo County, a woman in her 30s in Santa Fe County, a woman in her teens in Sandoval County, and a woman in her 50s. The case of the Bernalillo County woman in her 40s was under investigation as potential community spread, with no known travel or personal link.
- March 19: Seven more cases were confirmed. Four cases were from Bernalillo County, two from Santa Fe County, and one from San Miguel County. The Department of Health noted for the first time that it had detected community spread within New Mexico.
- March 20: An additional eight cases were confirmed, including the first cases in Doña Ana and McKinley counties. Two more cases each of Bernalillo and Sandoval counties, as well as a new case in Taos County, were also confirmed.
- March 21: 14 new cases were confirmed, including the first case in Lea County. The other cases confirmed consisted of 9 in Bernalillo County and one each in Doña Ana, Sandoval, Santa Fe, and Taos County.
- March 22: Statewide case total is 65 with two new cases in Bernalillo, Doña Ana, and Santa Fe counties and one in McKinley and San Juan counties.
- March 23: Governor Lujan Grisham announced a statewide stay-at-home order that requires 100% of non-essential business workforce to work from home effective March 24. 18 new cases are also announced with four new cases in Bernalillo and Chaves counties (it was later revealed that one of the Chaves county cases was the result of a clerical error), six in Doña Ana and two in San Juan and Santa Fe counties bringing the reported statewide total to 83.
- March 24: Total cases reach 100 as 17 new cases are reported with five new cases in Bernalillo county, three in Doña Ana, four in San Juan, two in Santa Fe, and one in McKinley as well as Cibola and Curry the first for those counties.
- March 25: The first death in the state is reported. A male in his late 70s died on March 22 at Artesia General Hospital. A COVID-19 test was done and confirmed late on March 24 that he tested positive for the virus. The individual also had multiple underlying chronic health issues. 13 new cases are reported with five in Bernalillo county, three in Santa Fe, two in Rio Arriba, one in San Juan and Sandoval counties and a deceased male in Eddy County bringing the statewide total to 112.
- March 26: 24 more cases are reported with seven new cases in Bernalillo county, six in San Juan, five in Santa Fe, three in Doña Ana, two in Sandoval, and one in Chaves county bringing the statewide total to 136.
- March 27: Total cases reach 191 as 55 more cases are reported with 27 in Bernalillo county, 7 in Santa Fe, 5 in Sandoval and Taos, 3 in San Juan, 2 in McKinley, and one in Cibola, Eddy, Lea, Rio Arriba, Roosevelt, and Valencia counties. Governor Lujan Grisham extends the K-12 public school closures to the end of the school year.
- March 28: The second death in the state is reported in Bernalillo county, a male in his 80s with chronic health issues died on March 27. 17 more cases are reported with 11 in Bernalillo, 3 in Chaves, and one in Doña Ana, Eddy and San Juan counties bringing the statewide total to 208. The New Mexico Department of Health also reports that 26 cases are designated as having recovered.
- March 29: 29 new cases are reported with nine in Bernalillo, four in McKinley, San Juan and Santa Fe counties, three in Sandoval, two in Curry, and one in Chaves and Valencia counties bringing the statewide total to 237.
- March 30: 44 more cases are reported as well as two more deaths in Bernalillo county. New cases are 16 in Bernalillo, 5 in Sandoval and San Juan, 3 in McKinley, Santa Fe, Torrance and Valencia bringing the statewide total to 281 with 4 deaths.
- March 31: 35 additional cases are reported with another death (a male in his 40s with an underlying health condition). New cases include 12 in Bernalillo, 7 in Sandoval, 6 in San Juan, 4 in McKinley and Santa Fe, and one in Rio Arriba and Taos counties bringing the statewide total to 315 with five deaths.

=== April 2020 ===
- April 1: New testing criteria are announced to allow asymptomatic people in close contact with those who have tested positive as well as asymptomatic people in nursing homes, group homes, homeless shelters and detention centers to be considered for COVID-19 testing. 48 more new cases are reported with 19 in Bernalillo county, six in Santa Fe, five in San Juan, four in McKinley, three in Doña Ana and Sandoval, two in Cibola and Curry, and one new case in Catron, Grant, Otero and Taos counties. One death is also reported a female in her 90s in Sandoval county. The statewide total is 363 reported cases with six deaths.
- April 2: Total cases reach 403 with 15 new cases in Bernalillo county, 8 in Sandoval, 4 in McKinley and San Juan, 3 in Chaves, and one new case in Cibola, Curry, Doña Ana, Rio Arriba, Socorro, and Taos counties. One more death is reported a woman in her 70s in Bernalillo county with seven deaths in the state. 31 cases are now designated as having recovered.
- April 3: The largest number of new cases to date is reported with 92 positive tests confirmed. 39 new cases are reported in Bernalillo county, 26 in Sandoval, 9 in San Juan, 8 in McKinley, 4 in Santa Fe, 3 in Cibola, and 1 in Doña Ana bringing the statewide total to 495. An outbreak occurs at the La Vida Lleno nursing home in northeast Albuquerque resulting in two deaths with 19 more residents and 3 staffers testing positive for COVID-19.
- April 4: 51 new cases are reported with 23 in Bernalillo, 9 in San Juan, 6 in Santa Fe, 4 in Cibola, 3 in Torrance, 2 in Sandoval, and the first reported cases in Lincoln and Los Alamos counties and one new case in McKinley and Rio Arriba counties bringing the statewide total to 543. There is also one reported death in McKinley county bringing the statewide total to 11. Among the new cases 5 residents and 8 staffers from the La Vida Lleno nursing home in Albuquerque test positive for the virus bringing the total to 35 from that facility. 54 cases are designated as having recovered.
- April 5: 81 new confirmed cases bring the statewide total to 624 with one death in McKinley county.
- April 6: Governor Lujan Grisham extends the stay at home order through April 30 effective at 8 am on April 7 with new restrictions limiting the number of people allowed in grocery or big box stores to 20 percent of the maximum occupancy limit as determined by the fire departments. 62 new confirmed cases bring the statewide total to 686.
- April 7: 109 new cases are reported with 42 in Bernalillo, 24 in San Juan, 18 in Sandoval, 11 in McKinley, 5 in Doña Ana, 2 in Curry and Santa Fe, and 1 new case in Chaves, Cibola, Grant, Taos, and Torrance counties and one death in Bernalillo county bringing the statewide total to 794 cases and 13 deaths with 171 recoveries. Of the total cases in Sandoval county 52 were on the San Felipe Pueblo and 31 on Zia Pueblo.
- April 8: 72 more cases and three deaths in Bernalillo county (all residents of the La Vida Llena nursing home) are reported bringing the statewide total to 865 cases, 16 deaths and 201 recoveries.
- April 9 Another record number of cases are reported with 124 positive tests including 45 in Bernalillo, 31 in Sandoval, 13 in McKinley, 9 in San Juan, 5 in Cibola and Doña Ana, 3 in Santa Fe and Valencia, 2 in Chaves, Los Alamos, and Socorro, and one new case in Colfax, Curry, Taos, and Torrance counties bringing the statewide total to 989. One more death is reported in Bernalillo county, a female in her 80s who was a resident at the La Vida Llena long-term facility, the sixth death from there. 17 total deaths in the state have occurred with 217 recoveries.
- April 10: 106 more cases are reported bringing the statewide total to 1,091. Two more deaths are also reported.
- April 11: 86 more cases and one death are reported bringing the total 1.174. Governor Lujan Grisham extends the ban on mass gatherings to include houses of worship right before Easter.
- April 12: 74 new cases are reported bringing the total to 1,245. Six more deaths are also reported.
- April 13: 107 new cases bring the statewide total to 1,345 with five deaths reported.
- April 14: 62 more cases bring the statewide total to 1,407 with five additional deaths.
- April 15: 80 new cases bring the statewide total to 1,484. No deaths are reported.
- April 16: The highest number of deaths to date are reported with eight deaths, one in Bernalillo, Cibola, and Sandoval counties, two in McKinley, and three in San Juan. 116 additional cases are reported with McKinley, Sandoval and San Juan counties having the largest increases.
- April 17: 115 more cases are reported bringing the statewide total to 1,711. Seven more deaths are also reported bringing the total to 51.
- April 18: 87 more cases are reported with 40 new cases in McKinley county, 17 in San Juan, 13 in Bernalillo, 10 in Sandoval, 2 in Doña Ana and Santa Fe, and one in Cibola, Guadalupe, and Quay counties bringing the total to 1,798. Two more deaths are reported in Bernalillo and McKinley counties.
- April 21: Total cases in the state reach 2,072 as 103 new cases are reported with 45 in McKinley, 21 in San Juan, 20 in Bernalillo, 5 in Sandoval, 3 in Doña Ana and Socorro, 2 in Cibola and Santa Fe, and 1 in Lincoln and Valencia counties. Seven more deaths are also reported with five in Bernalillo county with four being residents from the La Vida Llena nursing home and one death in Chaves and McKinley counties bringing the total to 65.
- April 22: A new record of cases is reported as 139 more positive tests are confirmed. These include 59 new cases in McKinley county, 25 in San Juan, 19 in Sandoval, 15 in Bernalillo, 7 in Doña Ana, 5 in Santa Fe, 3 in Lea and Roosevelt, and 1 new case in Eddy, Guadalupe, and Valencia counties bringing the statewide total to 2,210. Six more deaths are also reported with one in McKinley county and five in San Juan two of which were residents at the Life Care Center of Farmington bringing the total number of deaths to 71.
- April 23: Another record number of cases is reported with 169 positive tests confirmed. New cases include 54 in McKinley, 51 in San Juan, 31 in Bernalillo, 6 in Doña Ana, 4 in Sandoval and Socorro, 3 in Cibola, Lea, Santa Fe and Valencia, 2 in Otero, and 1 new case in Chaves, Guadalupe, Harding, Quay, and Taos counties bringing the new statewide total to 2,379. Seven more deaths (all females from ages 30s–90s) are reported in Bernalillo, McKinley, Sandoval and San Juan counties with a new total of 78.
- April 24: 153 more cases are reported while some errors were corrected. The new cases include 67 in McKinley, 31 in San Juan, 25 in Bernalillo, 12 in Sandoval, 6 in Doña Ana, 4 in Guadalupe, 3 in Valencia, 2 in Lea, and one new case in Otero, Rio Arriba, and Socorro counties bringing the statewide total to 2,521. Six deaths are reported including two in Bernalillo county who were both short-term residents at Genesis Uptown in Albuquerque, three in San Juan who were residents at Cedar Ridge Inn in Farmington and one in McKinley county bringing the total to 84.
- April 25: A new record of nine deaths are reported. Six in San Juan county (five of which were residents at the Life Care Center of Farmington), two in Sandoval and one in Catron county bringing the total to 93. 139 more positive tests are confirmed including 69 in McKinley, 19 in Bernalillo, 16 in Doña Ana, 15 in San Juan, 8 in Sandoval, 5 in Guadalupe, 2 in Roosevelt, and 1 in Cibola, Curry, Santa Fe, Socorro, and Union counties bringing the total to 2,660. McKinley county also surpasses Bernalillo with the most total number of cases.
- April 27: The state government begins a series of PSAs highlighting the personal stories of those who have been affected by the COVID-19 virus to show the importance of keeping social distancing and following public health safety orders. 101 new cases are reported bringing the statewide total to 2,823 with five more deaths bringing the state total to 104.
- April 29: Another record number of cases is reported with 239 confirmed positive tests. These include 133 new cases in McKinley county, 68 in San Juan, 27 in Bernalillo, 2 in Sandoval and Valencia, and one new case in Cibola, Doña Ana, Guadalupe, Luna, Otero, Sierra, and Socorro counties bringing the statewide total to 3,213.
- April 30: A new record number of deaths is reported with 11 total, 7 in San Juan county who were all residents of the Life Care Center of Farmington as well 3 in McKinley and one from Luna county bringing the statewide total to 123. 198 more cases are reported including 74 in McKinley, 48 in Bernalillo, 45 in San Juan, 13 in Doña Ana, 5 in Cibola, 4 in Curry and Sandoval, 2 in Santa Fe and one new case in Roosevelt, Taos and Valencia county bringing the new total to 3,411.

=== May 2020 ===
- May 1: Governor Lujan Grisham invokes the state's Riot Control Act ordering a lockdown on the city of Gallup which has some the state's highest infection rates. The order which runs from 12 pm May 1 to 12 pm May 4 (but could be extended) closes all roads entering the city, orders essential businesses to only operate from 8 am to 5 pm and allows no more than two occupants per vehicle. 104 more cases are reported with 37 in McKinley, 21 in Bernalillo, 16 in San Juan, 11 in Cibola, 7 in Sandoval, 4 in Rio Arriba, 3 in Doña Ana, 2 in Valencia, and 1 new case in Chaves, Socorro, and Taos counties bringing the statewide total to 3,513. Eight more deaths are reported bringing the total to 131.
- May 2: 220 more cases are reported with 73 new case in San Juan, 53 in Bernalillo and McKinley, 14 in Sandoval, 7 in Santa Fe, 6 in Doña Ana, 4 in Rio Arriba, 2 in Lea and Valencia, and 1 new case in Curry, Eddy, Grant, Luna, Otero, and Torrance counties bringing the statewide total to 3,732. Eight more deaths are reported bringing the total to 139.
- May 4: The number of cases passes 4,000 as 186 new cases are reported with 89 in McKinley, 47 in San Juan, 24 in Bernalillo, 11 in Doña Ana, 5 in Sandoval, 3 in Otero, 2 in Socorro, and 1 in Chaves, Cibola, De Baca, and Santa Fe counties bringing the statewide total to 4,031.
- May 5: Governor Lujan Grisham sets new face covering requirements for employees beginning May 6 as businesses prepare to reopen. 107 new cases are reported with 43 in McKinley, 25 in San Juan, 21 in Bernalillo, 5 in Sandoval, 4 in Cibola, 3 in Doña Ana, 2 in Socorro and Valencia, and 1 in Curry and San Miguel counties bringing the statewide total to 4,138.
- May 15: Governor Lujan Grisham signs a modified public health order that eases restrictions allowing all retailers to reopen at 25 percent capacity while requiring everyone to wear a face mask in public unless eating, drinking, or exercising. This order will be in effect through May 31.
- May 20: Governor Lujan Grisham states that the state is on track to open dine-in services, salons, gyms, malls, and other services by June 1. New Mexico is reported to be one of two states on target to meeting Phase I criteria set by the CDC.

=== June 2020 ===
- June 25: Parishioners of the Calvary Chapel New Harvest Church may have been exposed to COVID-19. The church is located in Los Lunas in Valencia County.

=== July 2020 ===
- July 13: Due to an increase in new cases, Governor Lujan Grisham reimposed restrictions. Indoor seating in restaurants and breweries is prohibited. Face-coverings are required while exercising in public. State parks are closed to out of state visitors.
- July 23: Due to a delay in test kits and supplies, the state testing criteria has been revised to only test people who are symptomatic for the virus.

=== July 2021 ===
New Mexico restarted a vaccination incentive program offering $100 for any New Mexico resident who gets vaccinated. According to the state health department the first round of the program saw a 333% increase in single shot vaccinations and a 26% increase in completed vaccinations. Being fully vaccinated is not a requirement to receive the incentive which is being funded by federal stimulus money.

== Impact ==
=== Indian nations ===
As of mid-May 2020, Native Americans comprised about 11% of New Mexico's population but made up a large proportion of positive cases of COVID-19 in New Mexico. Nearly 60% of the state's reported cases came from tribal communities, with Navajos accounting for 45% of New Mexico's positive cases. Roughly 50% of all COVID-19 fatalities in New Mexico were Native American.

In response to the spread of COVID-19, the Navajo Nation closed their tribe-operated casinos in mid-March with reported plans to open in June 2020. The Navajo Nation Gaming Enterprise stated that casino employees would still receive pay and benefits. Other operations of the Navajo Nation, such as public services through the judicial branch, would be provided electronically through July.

=== Schools ===
On March 12 the governor announced that all public schools in the state would be closed for three weeks beginning at the end of the school day on March 13. On March 27 it was announced that schools would remain closed for the rest of the academic year. New education plans are in development including online or paper packets sent by mail as well as educational programs being developed for PBS stations beginning on April 6. Plans to determine "demonstrations of competency" for graduating seniors are also being worked out. Some school teachers will also receive training for new "distance learning" programs such as virtual classrooms.

=== Businesses ===
Non-essential businesses have been ordered to close as of March 24. These include shopping malls, flea markets, movie theaters, gyms and health clubs, hair and nail salons, bars, nightclubs, entertainment venues, casinos and convention centers. Restaurants are open only to take-out orders. This order is in effect until April 10 but could be extended. The order has been extended through April 30 with new restrictions on the number of customers and staff allowed inside a grocery or other large store to 20 percent or less the maximum occupancy limit as determined by the fire department. Hotels, RV parks and other lodgings must not operate at more than 25 percent maximum capacity, down from the previous 50 percent. Stand-alone liquor stores are no longer considered essential businesses and were required to close on April 7. The stay-at-home order was extended to May 15 with some new modifications allowing for non-essential businesses to provide curbside pick-up and delivery while some state parks and golf courses can reopen with some restrictions. Federally licensed firearm retailers can operate by appointment only. Pet care and veterinarians can also reopen. Previous restrictions on restaurants and grocery stores will remain in place. Beginning on May 6 employees of grocery and large retail stores are required to wear face masks while other essential businesses will be required to ware a face covering beginning on May 11. While customers will not be required to wear masks businesses are encouraged to post signs asking people to wear them while also being able to set requirements at their own discretion.

=== Religion ===
While most religious institutions have suspended services, Governor Lujan Grisham expanded the ban on mass gatherings to include houses of worship on April 11, a day before Easter. Legacy church in Albuquerque challenged the order claiming that about 30 people were needed in the building to produce their online services which the order prohibited more than five people gathering. A federal judge dismissed the motion on April 17. Houses of worship will be able to reopen at 25 percent capacity starting May 16.

=== Gallup lockdown ===
With one of the highest rates of infections in the state, the city of Gallup was put on lockdown beginning at noon on May 1 and scheduled to end at noon on May 4 unless extended. Governor Michelle Lujan Grisham at the request of Mayor Louis Bonaguidi, invoked the state's Riot Control Act to close any roads leading into Gallup which sees thousands come into the town for shopping and other services from surrounding areas including the Navajo Nation. Non-residents may not enter the city and essential businesses can open at 8 am and must close by 5pm while vehicles may have no more than two occupants. The state national guard and state police were deployed to carry out this order trying to slow the spread of the virus. The order was extended until noon on May 7 and a modified order was extended until noon on May 10 with roads into the city remaining closed to non-residents until 8 pm on May 8. On May 18, Gallup Police began enforcing a city ordinance requiring everyone over the age of two to wear a mask or face covering, issuing non-traffic citations to those in violation.

=== Prisons ===
The number of confirmed infections among incarcerated individuals rose from less than two dozen on May 8, 2020, to more than 600 by June 5, 2020. This was 7% of statewide cases. Affected inmates were held at Cibola County Correctional Center, Otero County Prison Facility and the colocated ICE Otero County Processing Center, Santa Fe County's Penitentiary of New Mexico, Torrance County Detention Facility, and Valencia County's Central New Mexico Correctional Facility. On June 11, a case was confirmed at Cibola County's Northwest New Mexico Correctional Facility. On July 23, 2 cases were confirmed at Lea County Correctional Facility. The next day, on July 24, cases were confirmed at Union County's Northeast New Mexico Correctional Facility and Cibola County's Western New Mexico Correctional Facility. On September 23, an initial case was confirmed at Doña Ana County's Southern New Mexico Correctional Facility. An initial case at Guadalupe County Correctional Facility was confirmed on October 31. The following day, a case was confirmed at Roswell Correctional Center in Chaves County. An initial case at Springer Correctional Center in Colfax County was confirmed on November 15, 2020.

The state Environment Department announced on December 9 that it would begin monitoring sewage from prisons and youth rehabilitation facilities to detect the virus.

== Statistics ==
=== Demographics ===
View source data.
View source data.
View source data.

Source: Analysis by the New Mexico Department of Health, as of May 11, 2023.

=== New cases per day ===
View source data.

=== New deaths per day ===
View source data.

=== Hospitalizations ===
View source data.

== See also ==
- COVID-19 pandemic in the Navajo Nation
- Timeline of the COVID-19 pandemic in the United States
- COVID-19 pandemic in the United States – for impact on the country
- COVID-19 pandemic – for impact on other countries
