= YesCare =

Privately held prison healthcare contractor

- Type: Private
- Founded: 1978 (Before 2011 known as CMS)
- Headquarters: Brentwood, Tennessee, United States
- Key people: CEO James Hyman
- Revenue: $1.5 billion in 2015
- Owner: Flacks Group

YesCare Corporation (doing business under Corizon Health, Inc. and Tehum) is a privately held prison healthcare contractor in the United States. The company provides healthcare and pharmacy services (PharmaCorr) to approximately 28 clients in 15 U.S. states, including 139 state prisons, municipal jails, and other facilities. Serving over 115,000 inmates, Corizon Health offers dental, mental health, optometry services, and substance abuse treatment as well as general healthcare. The company is headquartered in Brentwood, Tennessee.

== Merger ==
CMS became Corizon Health, Inc., in 2011, after essentially merging its operations with PHS Correctional Healthcare (previously known as Prison Health Services, Inc.), its largest competitor in the correctional health care industry. PHS's headquarters, in Brentwood, Tennessee, is now the headquarters for Corizon Health. The company has been majority-owned by hedge fund BlueMountain Capital Management for a few years until the private investment company Flacks Group acquired the company in 2020. Flacks Group is now a sole investor in Corizon Health. With the Flacks Group acquisition, Corizon Health managed to reduce its debt burden. The transaction included an acquisition of PharmaCorr that is Corizon's in-house pharmacy. Corizon Health's PharmaCorr is the only in-house pharmacy in the corrections industry.

== Controversies ==
Corizon was sued for malpractice 660 times between 2011 and 2016.

Corizon Health, like its predecessors CMS and PHS, has faced criticism from government officials, public-health advocates and experts for being more concerned with maintaining lucrative government contracts than effectively treating sick inmates, who are considered the most chronically and profoundly physically and mentally ill members of any society. In 2005, The New York Times published investigative articles that revealed broad complaints about Corizon's corporate predecessor, PHS, from officials, medical experts and its own employees about the companies treatment of the incarcerated people in its care. Civil rights organizations such as the ACLU claim Corizon puts profits ahead of the healthcare of inmates. David Fathi, the director of the ACLU National Prison Project, in response to the June 2010 death of inmate Xavius Scullark-Johnson at the Minnesota Correctional Facility – Rush City (served by Corizon), said, "We believe that incarceration is a uniquely governmental function that should never be contracted out to private, for-profit corporations. When you combine the profit motive with limited oversight and an unpopular, politically powerless group like prisoners, it's a recipe for bad outcomes."

The Maine Department of Corrections selected CMS as a party to begin a contract with in early April 2003. However, a 2011 Report by the Maine State Legislature Office of Program Evaluation and Government Accountability revealed serious deficiencies in the care provided to Maine prisoners by CMS. It cited issues with administration of medication, improperly maintained medical files, delays in provision of care and insufficiently trained staff. In June 2012, the Maine Department of Corrections terminated its contract with CMS.

At one time the Mississippi Department of Corrections contracted with CMS which provided health care services at county and state-owned Mississippi DOC facilities. CMS's contract began on July 1, 2003. A three-year contract, to Wexford Health Sources awarded in 2006, was for $95 million. It was to provide medical, mental health, pharmacy, rehabilitation, utilization management, claims processing and technology services to more than 14,000 Mississippi prisoners at 34 facilities statewide. The contracts for the state's four for-profit prisons which held MDOC inmates subsequently went to a Jackson, Mississippi provider, one who paid substantial bribes to MDOC Corrections Commissioner Chris Epps. In 2016 Epps was indicted for taking close to $2 million in bribes from a number of contractors, pleaded guilty and was sentenced to almost 20 years in federal prison.

Corizon currently operates Arizona's prison healthcare system and has been criticized for inadequate staffing and neglect by former employees and the ACLU. A former Corizon employee turned whistleblower claims that staff shortages resulted in mentally ill prisoners going unfed or sitting for hours at a time in their own excrement; in some cases prisoners died from lack of proper treatment. Dan Pochoda, legal director for the ACLU in Arizona, said the healthcare system in Arizona prisons is the worst he has seen in his 40-year career. “People are often sent to prison for two-year, three-year sentences that have turned into death sentences because of the absence of the basic minimal care,” he said.

Another former Corizon employee, psychotherapist George Mallinckrodt, claims he was fired as retaliation for writing reports on inmate abuse. Corizon claims the discharge was due to falsifying timesheets in order to take longer lunches. Mallinckrodt has since written a book about the alleged torture and murder of Darren Rainey by guards at Dade Correctional Institution which occurred while Corizon provided mental health services at the facility, but after Mallinckrodt had been fired.

Corizon provided medical care at the Washington County (Oregon) Jail, where inmate Madaline Pitkin died on April 24, 2014, after going through heroin withdrawal. Multiple employees of Corizon responsible for Pitkin's care allegedly made mistakes in care, such as not responding to Pitkin's complaints about withdrawal, misrecording dates of care, failure to follow protocols for regular blood pressure measurements, inability to complete blood pressure measurements, and inability to communicate with attending physicians and nurses. Pitkin also collapsed several times during her stay at the jail, but she was not transported to an outside medical facility.

Washington County conducted an audit of Corizon's performance as medical provider for the jail, and determined that Corizon failed to staff the jail with a registered nurse approximately 20% of the time they were required to. Five months after the audit was completed, Washington County replaced Corizon with NaphCare, a competing correctional medical services company. According to a county spokesperson, most of the former Corizon employees are no longer working at the jail.

In May 2016, the company lost its contract with the state of New Mexico. The firm paid more than $4.5 million to settle lawsuits brought by the state. Most of the suits, press reports indicate were related to a single doctor who was accused of sexually abusing inmates at the Guadalupe County Correctional Facility in Santa Rosa and the Northeast New Mexico Detention Facility in Clayton. Other payments were for two deaths of inmates.

In September 2021, Ann Murray, a fired nurse who worked at the Jefferson City Correctional Center in Missouri, was accused of having multiple sexual encounters with an inmate with whom she had discussed their marriage, after obtaining an intended divorce. She also stands accused of the fatal poisoning of her husband and burning down their home in 2020 to cover up the crime.

On December 1, 2022, a jury found for family members rendering a $6.4 million verdict in a case of a deceased prisoner serving a five-day sentence for a theft of under $100. Wade Jones died of complications of alcohol withdrawal in the Kent County Correctional Facility. The lawsuit alleged Jones was a victim of Corizon's deliberate indifference while in jail in Grand Rapids, Michigan.

In 2023, Corizon split into two entities, Corizon and CHS TX. Managed by CEO Sara Tirschwell, CHS TX retained almost all of the employees, contracts and assets of the original Corizon entity. On February 17, 2023, the new Corizon entity filed for Chapter 11 bankruptcy. YesCare, a corporation also run by CEO Sara Tirschwell, purchased the CHS TX entity. As commented by the Wall Street Journal, "YesCare, formerly known as Corizon, expands a legal tactic for cleansing businesses of litigation through bankruptcy."

On May 8, 2026, YesCare filed for Chapter 11 bankruptcy, which marked Corizon's second time in bankruptcy in three years. YesCare claimed that financial and legal troubles were the primary cause of the decision. The company listed assets between $50 million and $100 million and liabilities between $100 million and $500 million.

== See also ==
- Correctional medicine
- Infectious diseases within American prisons
- Prison–industrial complex
