= Lea County Correctional Center =

Prison in New Mexico, United States

Coordinates: 32°45′51″N 103°13′25″W

- Interactive map of Lea County Correctional Center
- Location: 6900 West Millen Drive, Hobbs, New Mexico
- Status: Closed
- Security class: medium security
- Capacity: 1200
- Opened: 1998
- Closed: 2025
- Managed by: GEO Group

The Lea County Correctional Facility (LCCF) was a medium-security prison for men located four miles north-west of Hobbs, New Mexico, opened in 1998 on 60 acres of the former Hobbs Army Airfield, now adjacent to the Lea County Regional Airport.The facility housed 1200 state inmates of the New Mexico Corrections Department, and was operated by the private GEO Group under a contract administered through the county.

In its first year, LCCF was "the site of three fatal inmate stabbings, six nonfatal stabbings, a 'near-riot' and allegations of guards using excessive force, according to reports in both the Albuquerque Journal and Albuquerque Tribune."

In April 2002 the U.S. Department of Justice found three LCCF guards guilty of civil rights conspiracy and obstruction charges after assaulting a prisoner, then falsifying reports and lying to investigators.

In November 2011 the state of New Mexico imposed fines of $1.1 million against GEO Group for failing to maintain adequate staffing levels at LCCF. In March 2012 the state imposed another fine of nearly $300,000 for the company's failure to properly staff guards and health care workers; some positions had remained vacant for two months or longer.

== Notable inmates ==
- Joel Patrick Courtney (born 1966) – sentenced for kidnapping, rape, and murder of Brooke Wilberger (Corvallis, Oregon, USA) on May 25, 2004. Death sentence commuted to life, without parole (convicted Sept. 21, 2009).
- Nehemiah Griego (born 1997) – perpetrator of the 2013 South Valley homicides
- Nathaniel Jouett (born 2001) – perpetrator of the Clovis library shooting
- David Parker Ray (1939–2002) – abductor and possible serial killer; died at LCCF
