= Duran Consent Decree =

New Mexico state case law

The Duran Consent Decree was a stipulated agreement to litigation written by a prisoner, Dwight Duran, regarding prison conditions in the Penitentiary of New Mexico. It was first submitted as Duran v. Apodaca while Jerry Apodaca was governor in November 1977. When King became governor, it was renamed Duran v. King.

According to Roger Morris (1983), who conducted extensive interviews with the major plaintiffs in the case, this lawsuit arose out of a specific incident. In 1976, an inmate who was seeking medical help for heroin withdrawal at the prison hospital was thrown into the "hole" in Cellblock 3 of the Penitentiary of New Mexico, where he was allegedly beaten by guards, including being kicked "repeatedly in the scrotum" (Morris 1983: 47). After being released from segregation a month later, the inmate's health deteriorated. Dwight Duran, another prisoner who was a boyhood friend of this inmate, attempted to nurse him back to health, but his condition worsened. Duran and other inmates pleaded for almost a year with authorities to hospitalize their friend. "Simply for making the request they, too, were threatened with the hole" (Morris 1983: 48). Later, when the inmate was examined at a Santa Fe hospital, he was found to have "an advanced malignant tumor on his testicles" (Morris 1983: 48). The inmate was transferred to a locked ward in the state mental hospital, where he died two weeks later.

As a result of this incident, Dwight Duran wrote a 99-page hand-printed brief. It was mailed to the court in November 1977 on behalf of "all those similarly situated" (PNM prisoners) The brief charged the state with operating a prison under conditions that constituted cruel and unusual punishment. The suit was joined by the American Civil Liberties Union (ACLU) July 6, 1978, as one of their major cases challenging prison conditions in the United States. (No. CIV-77-72) The Duran Consent Decree became the basis "for the most sweeping reform ever proposed for any single prison in American history" (Morris 1983: 49)

The lawsuit, known initially as Duran v. Apodaca, represented the last organized non-violent attempt by inmates to bring about reforms at PNM.

Ten Grand Jury reports, dating back to the 1970s, had pointed out the serious dangers posed by the poor living conditions, overcrowding, mismanagement, and a shortage of trained personnel within the state corrections system, but the politicians had not been addressing these issues. The prison had not been a politically expedient issue until the New Mexico State Penitentiary riot.

== See also ==
- For another example of a Consent Decrees of the 1980s, see Kentucky State Reformatory
- New Mexico Corrections Department
