= William L. Summers =

American lawyer

William L. Summers (born March 6, 1942, in Ravenna, Ohio) is an American criminal defense lawyer.

== Career ==
Summers was admitted to the practice of law in the State of Ohio in 1969, and the State of Kentucky in 1988. In 1986, he argued before the U.S. Supreme Court in Firefighters v. Cleveland, 478 U.S. 501 (1986). He served as lead defense counsel for Larry Mahoney in the 1988 Carrollton, Kentucky bus collision case. Beginning in July 1990, he served as counsel for Jimmie Dean Stohler with regard to the Tulsa, Oklahoma Crossbow murder case.

In 1982, he received the Robert C. Heeney award as a result of his work in defending inmates prosecuted with regard to the New Mexico State Penitentiary riot.

He served on the boards of the National Association of Criminal Defense Lawyers for eleven years, The Ohio Association of Criminal Defense Lawyers, and The Kentucky Association of Criminal Defense Lawyers, and was president from 1977 to 1978 of The Cleveland Ohio Bar Association.
