= 2026 Chico library shooting =

Shooting in California, US

- Location: 39.743500°N 121.834219°W; Chico, California, US
- Date: June 22, 2026; 5:10 p.m. – 5:16 p.m. (PDT; UTC−07:00)
- Weapon: 20-gauge Remington 870 pump-action shotgun
- Deaths: 2
- Injuries: 1 (injured by broken glass)
- Motive: Columbine High School massacre copycat crime
- Accused: Bradley Scott Sayer
- Charges: Murder with special circumstances (2 counts)

On June 22, 2026, a shooting occurred at the Chico branch of the Butte County Library, a public library in Chico, California, United States. Two people were killed, and an 8-year-old girl was injured by broken glass. The suspect was identified by Chico police as Bradley Scott Sayer.

== Shooting ==
At approximately 5:10 p.m. PDT, Sayer walked through the library unarmed, then returned to his vehicle to retrieve a shotgun. After re-entering the building, Sayer encountered 46-year-old Cody Hull and a young girl in Hull's care, before entering the library; Hull was shot in the leg, and fatally in the head, while shielding the girl. Law enforcement noted that Sayer was unfamiliar with the weapon, which significantly slowed down the attack and limited the potential for scale of loss of life. During the incident, Sayer fired roughly eight rounds.

Police dispatchers received multiple calls about an active shooter inside the library at 5:12 p.m. PDT. Two minutes later at 5:14 p.m., the first officer arrived at the scene. As more officers arrived, Sayer fled out the back of the library before being apprehended immediately without incident two minutes later at 5:16 p.m. Two additional firearms that were both registered by a family member were also found from inside his vehicle.

=== Victims ===
Two adult men, 46-year-old Cody Hull (Note: Hull, who was born Jacob Cody Hull, went by Cody Hull.) of Chico and 74-year-old Robert Johnson of Orland, were killed in the shooting. An 8-year-old girl in Hull's care was also injured by broken glass while fleeing, but recovered.

== Suspect ==
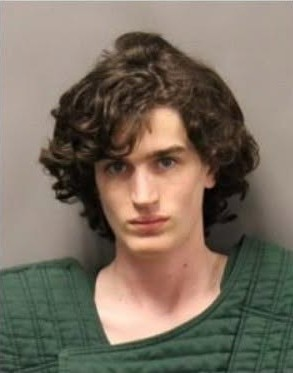
Mug shot of Sayer after his arrest

The suspect was identified as 18-year-old Bradley Scott Sayer (born 2008), a Chico resident who had recently graduated from Chico High School two weeks beforehand, and was on the "highly-functioning" autism spectrum. Sayer had no connection to the victims or the library. Before the shooting, Sayer made a phone call to his father. After the shooting, Sayer's parents were interviewed by investigators.

Sayer allegedly had a fascination with the Columbine High School massacre. FBI special agent Sid Patel stated he wore a T-shirt with "natural selection" written on it, a reference to one of the perpetrators.

Sayer was arraigned on June 25, 2026 for two counts of murder with special circumstances. During the arraignment hearing, Sayer flashed a white power symbol. Prosecutors said they are not currently seeking the death penalty. On September 29, Sayer waived his right to a preliminary hearing, allowing the case to move onto trial.

== Reactions ==
California Governor Gavin Newsom released a statement, saying: "We are grateful to law enforcement for their swift actions to secure the scene and take the suspect into custody. No family should have to endure a tragedy like this." Republican representative James Gallagher also released a statement saying that he was "heartbroken by the senseless act of violence" and thanked first responders.

== See also ==
- Clovis library shooting – a shooting at public library in Clovis, New Mexico
