= New Mexico State Penitentiary riot =

Most violent prison riot in U.S. history

Coordinates: 35°33′52.85″N 106°3′38.60″W

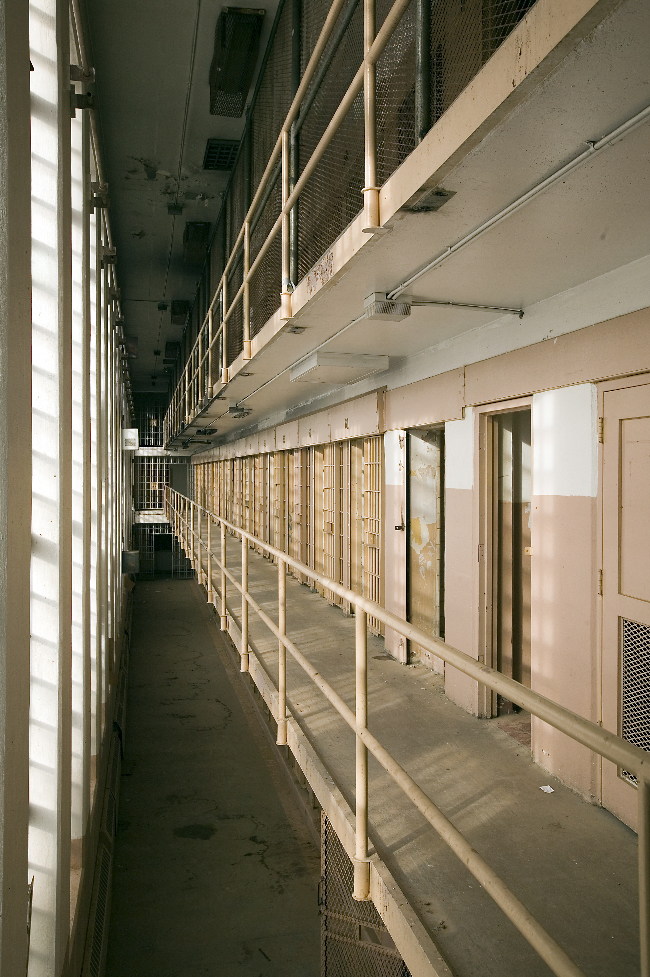
- One side of cellblock 4, where isolated prisoners were held
- Location: Santa Fe County, New Mexico, U.S.
- Date: February 2–3, 1980 (MDT)
- Attack type: Rioting, hostage-taking
- Deaths: 33
- Injuries: 200+
- Perpetrator: Inmates
- Defenders: State of New Mexico; New Mexico State Police; New Mexico National Guard

The New Mexico State Penitentiary riot, which took place on February 2 and 3, 1980, at the Penitentiary of New Mexico (PNM) south of Santa Fe, was the most violent prison riot in U.S. history in terms of injuries and their nature (torture, mutilation, dismemberment), and second deadliest riot in fatalities. Inmates took complete control of the prison and twelve officers were taken hostage. Several inmates were killed by other prisoners, with some being tortured and mutilated because they had previously acted as informants for prison authorities. Police regained control of PNM 36 hours after the riots had begun. By then, thirty-three inmates had died and more than two hundred were treated for injuries. None of the twelve officers taken hostage were killed, but seven suffered serious injuries caused by beatings and rapes.

There had been riots at PNM before it moved in 1956, the first occurring on July 19, 1922, and the second on June 15, 1953.

== Causes ==
The causes of the riot are well documented. Author Roger Morris wrote that "the riot was a predictable incident based on an assessment of prison conditions." Prison overcrowding and inferior prison services, common problems in many correctional facilities, were major causes of the disturbance. On the night of the riot, there were 1,156 inmates in a prison that had beds for fewer than 963. First-time non-violent prisoners were not adequately separated from repeat violent prisoners. Many were housed in crowded, unsanitary dormitories. PNM's food was of poor quality, a problem which was exacerbated by the prevalence of cockroaches and mice. Intestinal diseases were common. A visiting warden reported PNM as the filthiest institution he had ever seen.

Killed

- Michael Briones (Albuquerque)
- Lawrence C. Cardon (Las Cruces)
- Nick Coca (Taos)
- Richard J. Fierro (Carlsbad)
- James C. Foley (Albuquerque)
- Donald J. Gossens (Farmington)
- Phillip C. Hernandez (Clovis)
- Valentino E. Jaramillo (Albuquerque)
- Kelly E. Johnson (Albuquerque)
- Steven Lucero (Farmington)
- Joe A. Madrid (Albuquerque)
- Ramon Madrid (Las Cruces)
- Archie M. Martinez (Chimayo)
- Joseph A. Mirabal (Alamogordo)
- Ben G. Moreno (Carlsbad)
- Gilbert O. Moreno (Carlsbad)
- Thomas O'Meara (Albuquerque)
- Filiberto M. Ortega (Las Vegas, New Mexico)
- Frank J. Ortega (Las Vegas, New Mexico)
- Paulina Paul (Alamogordo)
- James Perrin (Chaparral)
- Robert F. Quintela (Carlsbad)
- Robert L. Rivera (Albuquerque)
- Vincent E. Romero (Albuquerque)
- Herman D. Russell (Waterflow)
- Juan M. Sanchez (Brownsville, Texas)
- Frankie J. Sedillo (Santa Fe)
- Larry W. Smith (Kirtland)
- Leo J. Tenorio (Albuquerque)
- Thomas C. Tenorio (Albuquerque)
- Mario T. Urioste (Santa Fe)
- Danny D. Waller (Lubbock, Texas)
- Russell M. Werner (Albuquerque)

Another cause was the cancellation of educational, recreational and other rehabilitative programs. When the educational and recreational programs were stopped in 1975, prisoners had to be locked down for long periods. These conditions created strong feelings of deprivation and discontent in the inmate population that would increasingly lead to violence and disorder.

Inconsistent policies and poor communications meant relations between officers and inmates were increasingly in decline. These patterns have been described as paralleling trends in other U.S. prisons as populations started to grow in the 1970s. The Attica prison riot was organized with solidarity among prisoners, demonstrated by their lack of interest in attacking one another, whereas the "snitch system" in the New Mexico Penitentiary pitted inmate against inmate, resulting in the distrust among inmates unless identified with a group.

Following a change in prison leadership in 1975, the penitentiary experienced a shortage of trained correctional staff. A subsequent investigation by the state attorney general's office found that prison officials began coercing prisoners to become informants in a strategy known as "the snitch game". The report said that retribution for snitching led to an increased incidence of inmate-on-inmate violence at the prison in the late 1970s.

There had been several disturbances at the prison prior to the riot. In 1976, a work strike was organized by inmates as a response to the prison's poor conditions. In an attempt to subdue the protestors, Deputy Warden Robert Montoya authorized the use of tear gas against the striking prisoners. As they exited the dormitory coughing from the gas, “they were stripped naked and run nearly a hundred yards down the central corridor through a gauntlet of officials who beat them with ubiquitous ax handles. Called 'the night of the ax handles', the incident was corroborated by several eyewitnesses, including some officials themselves, and resulted in serious injuries as well as a federal lawsuit, still pending in 1982, naming deputy warden [Montoya] and a senior guard captain among the assailants". After this violent response to prisoners' concerns, one inmate, Dwight Duran, was prompted to draft a 99-page handwritten civil rights complaint to the United States District Court for the District of New Mexico called Duran v Apodaca, later to become the Duran Consent Decree. There was ample evidence from over ten grand jury investigations (between 1977 through 1979) about the conditions at the penitentiary, but the PNM administration resisted the changes and the legislature refused to allocate the necessary funds to make changes. The last time the US District Court grand jury ordered improvements was in November 1979, two months before the riot.

There have been conflicting reports about the inmate population at the time of the riot and the official capacity of the prison that weekend. According to the Report of the Attorney General on the February 2 and 3, 1980, Riot at the Penitentiary of New Mexico (PART I: The Penitentiary, the Riot, the Aftermath - Appendix C1) published the June after the riot, the design capacity of the penitentiary was 1,058, based on the Phase II Technical Report: Facilities Inventory of the 1977 New Mexico Corrections Master Plan. However, that number included the 60 beds in Cell Block 5, which was closed for renovations. It also included the 24 beds in the Annex and the 32 beds in the Modular Unit, both outside of the main facility. The official number of beds available, therefore, on the night of the riot was actually 974, but even that number is hardly fair as it includes the 11 solitary confinement cells in the basement of Cell Block 3. The official population of the prison the night of the riot was determined to be 1,156.

== Hostages taken ==
The riot began with many of the prisoners intoxicated from homemade liquor they brewed inside the prison. Inmate Gary Nelson, assigned to E2 bunk 2, heard the plan to jump the guards if they did not lock the door to the dorm during the 1:00 a.m. count.

The routine for the count began with two officers entering the dormitory. A third officer was given all the other officers' keys and locked the door to the dorm until the officers were ready to come out. The dayroom was 60 feet all the way down to the far side of the dorm. The TV needed to be turned off and the dayroom locked. Because of overcrowding, the two officers went down two sides of a center aisle consisting of single beds the length of the dorm. As one officer looked down to the right between the rows of bunk beds, the other officer looked down to the left between the rows of bunks. At the last second, the shift commander entered E2 to help with the count. After he was let in, the officer outside the door did not latch it. The prisoners on the bunks by the door had to keep the door open, otherwise all they would accomplish was the taking of three officers locked in their own dorm.

On Saturday morning at 1:40 a.m., February 2, 1980, on cue, two prisoners in southside Dormitory E2 overpowered the officer before he closed the door. Including the officer manning the door, this meant the prisoners took four officers hostage. They also had escaped E2 dorm. They rushed out and overpowered the other officers engaged in shutting down the cell blocks at the south end of the prison. At this point the riot might have been contained if the grille to the south wing had been closed and locked. Officers Larry Mendoza and Antonio Vigil, who were eating breakfast in the officers' mess hall, heard men's voices in the main corridor. A prisoner in an officer's uniform was standing by the open grille, apparently guarding it. Approaching the grille marching north was a hallway filled with prisoners. The officers soon realized the vulnerability of the grille being open as this meant the path lay wide open for the inmates to attack the control center. They both ran to the control center and warned the officer of the situation. The north grille beside the control center had also routinely been left open most nights. The two officers took refuge in the north wing of the prison. The control center closed and locked the north grille behind them.

By 2:05 a.m. the inmates had gained complete control of the prison by smashing the supposedly bulletproof plate glass window of the control center with a heavy brass fire extinguisher. This gave them access to lock and door controls. However, since they did not know how to open the cell doors automatically from the control center, Cell Houses 1, 2, and 6 had to be opened manually.

== Violence ensues ==
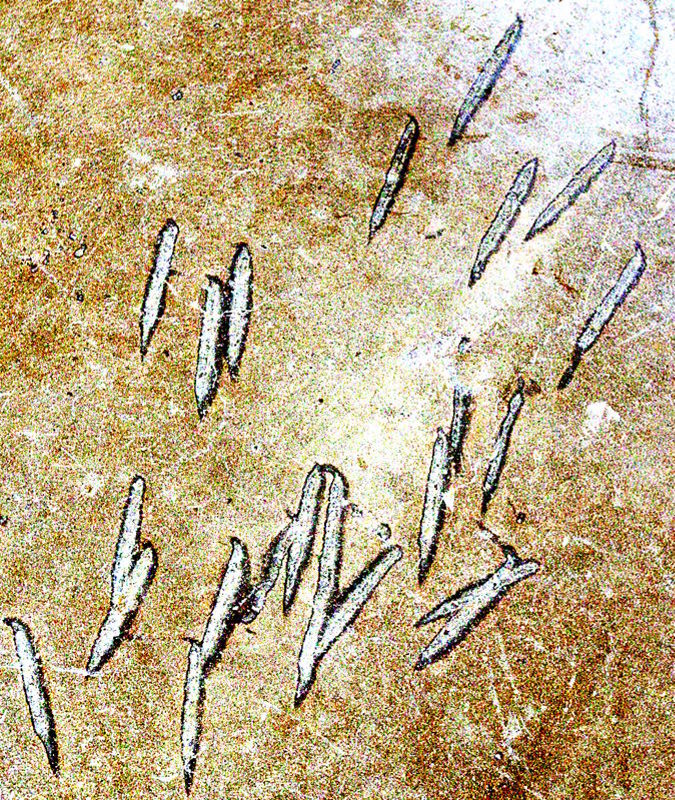
Even though they were filled in, marks are still visible from where an inmate was decapitated.

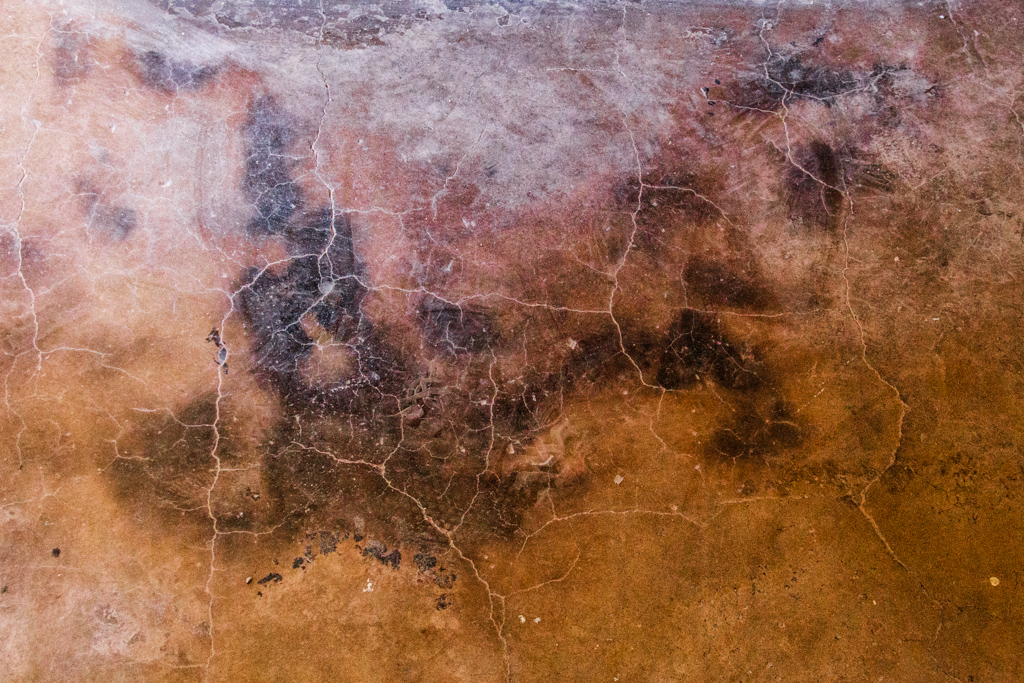
Burn marks on the floor where an inmate was allegedly burned alive with an acetylene torch.

Events spiraled out of control within the cell blocks in large part due to the actions of two gangs. The first were the Chicanos, who protected each other and dished out targeted retribution for specific grudges. The other gang was loosely labeled the Aryan Brotherhood and was led by some of the most dangerous inmates (who by this time had been released from segregation in Cell Block 3). They decided to break into Cell Block 4, which held prisoners labeled as informers. Cell Block 4 also housed inmates who were mentally ill, convicted of sex crimes, or otherwise vulnerable, and held a total of 96 prisoners. Initially, after taking over the control center, the call was to immediately take revenge on the snitches at the far north of the prison. However, to get there, they had to pass the Psychology Wing. Multiple prisoners broke in to find stores of drugs purchased in bulk. The drugs were not only consumed but emptied into shoe boxes to distribute to the other prisoners. Then they set a fire in the psychology office in order to destroy the psychology records that had been used to keep some prisoners from obtaining parole.

The first to arrive at Cell Block 4 found they did not have the keys to enter the cellblock. The rioters found blowtorches in nearby Cell Block 5, which had been brought into the prison for construction purposes. They used the blowtorches to cut through the security grilles into Cell Block 4 over the next five hours. It was going to take hours to cut through the bars to enter the cell block, so several inmates left to raid the records office to look for files that would identify who the informers were. Before sunrise Friday, rioters with walkie-talkies began detailing their plans to harm those in Cell Block 4 to prison officials over the radio, but no action was taken. One official stated, "It's their ass," when overheard speaking about the men in the segregation facility. Locked in their cells, the segregated prisoners called to the State Police outside just beyond the fence, pleading for them to save them. Waiting officers did nothing despite there being a back door to Cell Block 4, which would have offered a way to free them. As the door was intended only for emergency use and therefore never opened, the keys were not readily available. State police agreed with the prison negotiators not to enter the prison as long as the officers being held hostage were kept alive.

As dawn broke, an 'execution squad' finally cut through the grille and entered the rows of cells. The security panel controlling the cell doors just inside the grille was burned off, meaning each cell would have to be opened with blowtorches one at a time. When opened, victims were pulled from their cells to be tortured, dismembered, hanged, or burned alive. By 10:00 am 12 of the 96 prisoners in Cell Block 4 had been identified as “snitches” and brutally murdered.

During an edition of BBC's Timewatch program, an eyewitness described the carnage in Cell Block 4. He saw an inmate held up in front of a window; he was being tortured by using a blowtorch on his face and eyes until his head exploded. Another story was about Mario Urioste, who was jailed for shoplifting. He was originally placed by officers in a violent unit where he was gang-raped by seven inmates. Mario had filed a lawsuit against his rapists, so prison officials had housed him in Cell Block 4 for his own protection. Urioste was one of the targets for revenge. His body was found hanged, with his throat cut and his dismembered genitals stuffed into his mouth. In all, 16 inmates died in Cell Block 4.

Men were killed with piping, work tools, and shanks. One man was partially decapitated after being thrown over the second-tier balcony with a noose around his neck. The corpse was then dragged down and hacked up. A fire had been set in the gymnasium to burn a pile of corpses, but it had got out of control and burned through the roof. Besides the fire that had been set in the Psychology Wing, a fire was also set in the Protestant Chapel. The Protestant Chaplain had been nicknamed "Ax Handle" for his participation in the Night of the Ax Handles four years earlier. The Catholic Chapel next door was left untouched. Situated across the hall from the main control center, the prison library also was only touched by smoke. A third fire had been set in the records office, burning all records that could have been used as evidence related to the prisoners' civil rights claims in the Duran Consent Decree.

== Negotiations begin ==
When the riot broke out, prisoners had taken the officers' two-way radios as well as their keys. At 1:57 am the control room heard the first recorded radio transmission by an inmate with a radio, “We got the shift commander hostage. There had better be a meeting with the governor, the news media and (Deputy Secretary of Corrections and former warden Felix) Rodriguez.” "…the future course of the uprising will frequently be aimless and wild, with shifting and uncertain leadership, and often politics will be an apparent afterthought. Yet this clipped ultimatum will be testimony that the larger cause is always there. The inmate on the radio knows well…it is King and Rodriguez who will decide the fate of any reform, and they will be held accountable - if at all – by the media.” About thirty minutes after the riot began, Warden Jerry Griffin joined Deputy Warden Robert Montoya and Superintendent of Correctional Security Emanuel Koroneos at the gatehouse beneath Tower 1. Griffin, Montoya and Koroneos decided to attempt to negotiate the release of the hostages. Montoya contacted inmates at about 2:30 a.m. to initiate negotiations, first using a two-way radio in his car, then a hand set from the gate house. Montoya's earliest contact was with an inmate who had been involved with the initial takeover in Dorm E2 and apparently had control of the shift captain throughout the riot. This inmate identified himself as "Chopper One". As Montoya established contact with one inmate, other inmates transmitted conflicting messages, contradicted other inmate "spokesmen", or argued among themselves over the airwaves. Only the radio communications were recorded.

Deputy Warden Robert Montoya had recently taken a course in San Francisco on crisis intervention and a defiant Warden Jerry Griffin deferred to the aggressive deputy warden to negotiate with the inmates by radio for the time being until Rodriguez could be found. Griffin phoned Governor Bruce King at 3:00 a.m. that negotiations were under way and the governor agreed that they should talk rather than retake. He, too, had no choice. A little after 4:00 a.m. a Corrections Department aide finally reached Rodriguez on the telephone. The acting secretary arrived at the penitentiary about 5:00 a.m. and immediately took command.

Saturday morning, between six and seven o'clock, the radio negotiators jockeyed. Inmates asked for a doctor to treat injured guards. Montoya refused and instead asked for the release of wounded hostages. He also denied demands for a media parley and for his resignation. At 8:30 a.m. a field phone was installed to relieve the confusion of multiple walkie-talkies being used by unknown voices. This caused confusion identifying an inmate spokesman. Roger Morris on page 125 identified Don Stout as providing the first written demands. "The first document of the negotiation is clear: 'reduce overcrowding...comply with all court orders...no charges to be filed against inmates...due process in classification procedures...." By Saturday afternoon, four inmates were identified as inmate spokesmen. One of them was Lonnie Duran, who had been in solitary when the riot broke out. He had been one of the inmates (with Dwight Duran, no relation) who worked on the Duran Consent Decree since it was filed in New Mexico US District Court in 1977 outlining a raft of prison grievances.

When Lonnie Duran was accepted by Rodriguez as one of the four inmate spokesmen, the inmates repeated eleven demands from the Duran Consent Decree concerned with basic prison conditions including overcrowding, use of solitary confinement, protesting the loss of educational services, and elimination of programs. The prisoners then demanded to speak with independent federal officials and members of the news media.

Some of the officers held hostage were protected and fed by inmates. Two officers, disguised as inmates, were escorted out of the prison by sympathetic inmates. Two officers who had been brutally beaten and raped were carried out on blanket stretchers because the prisoners did not want an officer to die while in their custody. Seven officers suffered severe injuries. "One was tied to a chair. Another lay naked on a stretcher, blood pouring from a head wound."

Negotiations broke off Saturday evening and resumed in the early hours of Sunday morning. The negotiations were not recorded. The government negotiators' strategy was to win control of the prison by stalling.

== Order restored ==
By mid-afternoon, Sunday, 36 hours after the riot had begun, heavily armed State Police officers accompanied by officers from the Santa Fe Police Department entered the charred remains of the prison.

Official sources state that at least 33 inmates died. Some overdosed on drugs, while others were murdered. Twelve of the victims had been housed in the Protective Custody Unit. More than two hundred inmates were treated for injuries. An investigation by a citizens' panel concluded that the riot was initiated by a small number of inmates. Ray Powell of Albuquerque chaired a panel named by Governor Bruce King and Jeff Bingaman, the New Mexico Attorney General, to assist in the investigation. He concluded that the majority of the inmates were trying to flee from the riot. Powell said the report was based on hundreds of interviews with those involved in the riot and added, "There is one point that comes through time and again, and that is that the riot was started and conducted by a small number of inmates."

After the surrender, it took days before order was maintained enough to ensure that inmates could reoccupy the prison.

== Deaths ==
The official death toll included 33 people. Of them, 24 were Hispanic, 7 were white, 1 was black, and 1 was Indigenous. In comparison, the inmate population at the Penitentiary of New Mexico during this time was 49% Hispanic, 38% White, 10% Black, and 3% Indigenous. Author Roger Morris suggests the death toll may have been higher, as a number of bodies were incinerated or dismembered during the course of the mayhem. Several inmates died of drug overdoses after having raided the prison pharmacy.

== Legacy ==
A few inmates were prosecuted for crimes committed during the uprising, but according to author Roger Morris, most crimes went unpunished. The longest additional sentence given to any convict was nine years. Nationally known criminal lawyer William L. Summers led the defense team in defending dozens of inmates charged in the aftermath. In 1982, Summers received the National Association of Criminal Defense Lawyers Robert C. Heeney award for his work in defending the inmates prosecuted with regard to the riot.

Before and after the riots, Governor King's administration resisted attempts to reform the prison. One federal lawsuit that had been filed was handwritten by inmate Dwight Duran. He lost an inmate friend he had known since childhood after being beaten by guards four years before the riot. Even though his case was supported by the U.S. District Court, actual reforms were held up by negotiations for almost two decades. Actions were not settled until the administration of Governor Toney Anaya (former District Attorney) seven years later. Much of the evidence was lost or destroyed during and after the riot. However, systemic reforms after the riot were undertaken following the Duran v. King consent decree, which included implementation of the Bureau Classification System under Cabinet Secretary Joe Williams. The prison reform work from the Duran case developed the modern correctional system in New Mexico.

In 1989, the Bay Area thrash band Exodus memorialized the riot in "The Last Act of Defiance", the lead-off track of the album Fabulous Disaster.

The 2001 documentary Behind Bars: Riot in New Mexico covers the incident.

By 2013 the state began conducting tours of the old prison.

== See also ==
- Attica Prison riot – 1971 prisoner rebellion in New York
- List of law enforcement agencies in New Mexico
- List of notable prison riots
- List of United States state correction agencies
- New Mexico Corrections Department – State agency
