= Griego family murders =

Familicide in New Mexico, U.S.

2013 South Valley homicides
- Location: South Valley, New Mexico, United States
- Date: January 19, 2013
- Attack type: Mass shooting, familicide
- Weapons: .22-caliber Marlin Model 60 semi-automatic rifle; .223-caliber SIG Sauer 556 SWAT semi-automatic rifle
- Deaths: 5
- Injuries: 0
- Perpetrator: Nehemiah Griego

South Valley

A mass shooting on January 19, 2013, in South Valley, New Mexico, resulted in the deaths of five family members of the Griego family: the parents and three younger children. They were shot with two different weapons. The 15-year-old eldest son of the family, Nehemiah Griego, was arrested and charged with the shootings.

In October 2015, Nehemiah Griego pleaded guilty to two counts of second-degree murder and three counts of child abuse resulting in death. As he was a minor at the time of the crimes, a family court judge proposed to sentence him accordingly. This was appealed by the prosecutor and overturned by the appeals court in 2019. Griego was sentenced as an adult.

== Events ==
According to police, the suspect Nehemiah Griego, 15 years old, shot and killed his parents and three siblings at their house in South Valley, New Mexico, near Albuquerque. First he shot his mother twice in the face around midnight, with a .22 rifle. He said his younger brother Zephaniah woke up, and Griego told him he had shot their mother. He next shot Zephaniah once in the head with the same rifle. He went into the bedroom shared by his two younger sisters, who were crying, and fatally shot them one time each in the head, although one was also shot twice in the torso.

Griego went downstairs to wait for his father to return home from his shift at a homeless shelter. When the father returned about 5 a.m., Griego shot him four times with an AR-15-type semi-automatic rifle with a scope. The youth drove to church, with two rifles in the van. He told his 12-year-old girlfriend that his family was killed in an accident. The pastor received news that something was wrong with his father. When the pastor asked Griego about his father, Griego stated that his family was dead. The pastor and another member of the congregation, a retired homicide detective, decided to drive Griego back to the house, but on the way the retired detective felt something was wrong and called 911.

Afterward Griego changed his account of the events and made a statement to police, saying that he had been having suicidal and homicidal thoughts. He said he had obtained the guns from his parents' closet, that his father had bought them and taught both him and his mother to use them. He e-mailed a photo of his dead mother to his girlfriend. His intention had been to drive away, murder more people, and die in a gun battle with police.

At age 15, Griego was classified as a minor at the time of the crime. Under New Mexico law, minors charged with first-degree murder are to be tried as adults. However, persons who are minors when a crime is committed cannot be sentenced to death or life-without-parole.

== Victims ==
The five victims were Greg Griego and his wife Sarah, and their three younger children, a son and two daughters. The father, 51-year-old Greg Griego, was a former pastor at the area's Calvary Church. He served as a chaplain to the Albuquerque Fire Department.

He and his wife, 40-year-old Sarah Griego, were both active in prison ministry. They were the parents of the shooter, Nehemiah Griego, and nine other children, several older than the shooter. The murdered children, nine-year-old Zephaniah, five-year-old Jael, and two-year-old Angelina, were Nehemiah's younger siblings living at home. New Mexico politician Eric Griego is a brother of the late Greg Griego.

== Perpetrator ==
The perpetrator was 15-year-old Nehemiah Griego. He was booked into Bernalillo County Juvenile Detention Center and was charged with two counts of murder and three counts of child abuse resulting in death.

He agreed to speak to police without an adult or lawyer present. Griego told the police investigators "that he was angry at his mother and had suicidal thoughts". He initially pleaded not guilty due to insanity.

== Legal proceedings ==
By January 2015, the case was at a standstill due to several complications. Mental health evaluations of Griego were underway.

In October 2015, Griego pleaded guilty to two counts of second-degree murder and three counts of child abuse resulting in death. The Sheriff's office had said that Griego had been planning the killings for days. He had been held at the Sequoyah Adolescent Treatment Center for the previous 18 months before his plea. There would be hearings by the court as to the suitability of Griego to treatment as a juvenile. Extended family members supported the idea of an amenability hearing to determine whether the youth could be treated and did not want to see the case go to trial.

On February 11, 2016, Judge John J. Romero of the New Mexico Children's Court determined that, based on mental health evaluations, Griego is "amenable to treatment" and would be sentenced as a juvenile. This would mean that Griego, then 18, would likely be released from a youth detention facility when he turns 21. Bernalillo County District Attorney Kari Brandenburg announced that she would be appealing the ruling.

In August 2019, Judge Alisa Hart filed a 75-page order in 2nd Judicial District Court that reversed the order of the lower court to have Griego be sentenced in juvenile court. She found that, at age 22, he was "not amenable to treatment or rehabilitation in available facilities" and believed that he should not be treated in an unlocked facility. She said he is to be sentenced as an adult. He faced a sentence of up to 120 years in prison because of the multiple victims. His public defender said that it was also possible for him to receive a lesser sentence and continued treatment for his issues. These were confidential because he was a minor when he committed the crimes. Griego was ultimately sentenced to three concurrent life sentences plus seven years to run consecutively with the life sentences with credit given for the 2,476 days – six years and 285 days already served and in all must serve 30 years before being eligible for parole. An appeal to the New Mexico Supreme Court upheld the lower court ruling.

Griego was previously imprisoned at the Lea County Correctional Center but is now held at the Guadalupe County Correctional Facility.
