= David Parker Ray =

American kidnapper, serial rapist, torturer, and serial killer (1939–2002)

- Born: November 6, 1939; Belen, New Mexico, U.S.
- Died: May 28, 2002 (aged 62); Lea County Correctional Facility, Hobbs, New Mexico, U.S.
- Other name: The Toy-Box Killer
- Children: 1 daughter, 1 son, 1 stepson
- Penalty: 224 years imprisonment

Details
- Victims: 0 confirmed murders 3 abuse survivors Up to 60 homicides suspected
- Span of crimes: 1957–1999
- Country: United States
- States: New Mexico; Arizona
- Date apprehended: March 22, 1999

David Parker Ray (November 6, 1939 – May 28, 2002), also known as the Toy-Box Killer, was an American kidnapper, torturer, serial rapist, and suspected serial killer. Ray kidnapped, raped, and tortured an unknown number of women over many decades at his trailer in Elephant Butte, New Mexico, occasionally assisted by accomplices including his daughter Glenda Jean Ray and partner, Cindy Hendy. David Parker Ray was suspected by authorities and accused by accomplices of murdering up to 60 of his victims; however no bodies or definitive evidence have ever been uncovered linking him to any murders.

Ray used soundproofing methods on a semi-trailer, which he called his "Toy Box", and equipped it with items used for sexual torture. He would kidnap about four or five women a year, holding each of them captive for two to three months. During this period he would sexually abuse his victims and often torture them with surgical instruments, sometimes inviting his friends, wife, or even his male dog to rape the victim. After keeping them in captivity for a couple of months, Ray would drug the victim with barbiturates in an attempt to erase their memories before abandoning them by the side of a road.

Ray was arrested in March 1999 after one of his victims escaped, and he was convicted of kidnapping and torture in 2001. He received a lengthy sentence but was never tried for murder owing to lack of evidence. He died of a heart attack on May 28, 2002, shortly before a planned police interrogation.

== Biography ==
David Parker Ray was born on November 6, 1939, in Belen, New Mexico, to father Cecil Leland Ray (August 14, 1913 – September 23, 2009), a mechanic and native of Oregon, and mother Nettie Opal Parker (November 12, 1920 – March 19, 2002), who had been born in Texas. During his childhood, Ray and his younger sister, Peggie Pearl Ray (March 18, 1942 – December 13, 2009), lived with their mother's disciplinarian parents, Russell and Dolly Parker, on a small ranch due to their poor financial condition. He was sporadically visited by his violent, alcoholic father, who would supply him with magazines depicting sadomasochistic pornography. At Mountainair High School, in Mountainair, New Mexico, he was bullied by his peers for his shyness around girls, which resulted in his abusing alcohol and other drugs.

Ray's sexual fantasies of raping, torturing, and even murdering women developed during his teenage years. When Ray was 14 years old, his sister saw his sadomasochistic drawings and pornographic pictures of bondage practices. As a result, Ray and his sister became estranged. Based on statements made by Ray, he is believed to have begun assaulting women as an adolescent. In an advisory message that was tape recorded by Ray on July 23, 1993, he claimed: "I've been rapin' bitches ever since I was old enough to jerk off, and tie little girls' hands behind their back." He even alleged to his first wife that he had committed his first homicide sometime in 1957 when he kidnapped a woman, tied her to a tree, and tortured and murdered her. However, authorities were unable to verify his account. After completing high school, Ray served in the United States Army, where his service included work as a general mechanic. He received an honorable discharge. Ray then worked as a maintenance man for the New Mexico Parks Department in Truth or Consequences, New Mexico, for the entirety of his adulthood until his arrest. The resort town, located approximately 5 miles (8.0 km) from Elephant Butte, contained several local bars, which Ray frequented for victims.

Ray met 37-year-old Cindy Hendy who worked at a state park in Truth or Consequences and who was fleeing convictions on grand theft and drug charges in Washington. They became romantically involved and bonded over their shared violent sexual fantasies. In a 1993 recorded message, Ray told his captives that they would be forced to sexually service Hendy as well. Ray was divorced four times and had two children, including his accomplice, daughter Glenda "Jesse" Jean Ray. Jesse had tried to warn the FBI about her father's criminal activity in 1986. FBI Agent Doug Beldon recalled that Jesse Ray "alleged that David Parker Ray was abducting and torturing women and selling them to buyers in Mexico." However, the allegations were too vague for the FBI to initiate an arrest.

== Criminal history ==
Ray sexually tortured and presumably killed his victims using whips, chains, pulleys, straps, clamps, leg spreader bars, surgical blades, needles, electric shock machines, and saws. It is thought that he terrorized many women with these tools for many years with the help of accomplices, who are alleged to have included several of the women he was dating. Ray's torture room was a re-purposed, soundproofed cargo trailer located immediately outside his Elephant Butte property. Ray stocked the trailer, which he called the "Toy Box", with numerous sex toys, torture implements, syringes, and detailed diagrams showing ways of inflicting pain, as well as a homemade electrical generator to deliver electrical shocks to his victims. In total, Ray is believed to have spent $100,000 on the trailer, fitting it with sex toys and torture devices.

Reportedly, Ray constructed elaborate contraptions to confine his victims, such as a fur-lined coffin and a makeshift pillory. In addition, there were also elaborate locks and pulleys to prevent his captives from escaping. A mirror was mounted in the ceiling, above the obstetric table to which he strapped his victims so that they would be able to see themselves be raped and tortured. He has been said to have wanted his victims to see everything he was doing to them. Ray also put his victims in wooden contraptions that bent them over and immobilized them while he had his dogs and sometimes other friends rape them. Ray often had an audio tape recording of his voice played for his victims whenever they regained consciousness.

In the transcripts of his tapes, Ray detailed how he would occasionally release his captives, abandoning them by the side of a country road after severely drugging them with barbiturates to induce amnesia, which would prevent them from reporting the assaults:

I get off on mind games. After we get completely through with you, you're gonna be drugged up real heavy, with a combination of sodium pentothal and phenobarbital. They are both hypnotic drugs that will make you extremely susceptible to hypnosis, autohypnosis, and hypnotic suggestion. You're gonna be kept drugged a couple of days, while I play with your mind. By the time I get through brainwashing you, you're not gonna remember a fuckin' thing about this little adventure.

He would kidnap about four or five women a year, holding each of them captive for around two to three months. Exactly how many murder victims Ray claimed over the years is uncertain; investigators believe that he raped, tortured, and killed up to sixty individuals throughout his life but they have not been able to locate any of their remains. A diary that Ray kept detailed what he did to each victim, but it did not disclose where he buried their bodies. According to accomplice Cindy Hendy, Ray's fatal victims were dismembered and buried, dumped in the Elephant Butte Lake or nearby ravines.

The Albuquerque FBI in 2011 released hundreds of images of items that were collected during the investigation of Ray. The FBI believes some of the items, which included jewelry and clothes, may have been taken from victims. "The FBI, along with its law enforcement partners in New Mexico, is aggressively pursuing several leads in the search for remains of any possible victims of David Parker Ray," said Frank Fisher of the Albuquerque Field Office. "We are asking family and friends of missing people to look over these photographs and contact us if they recognize any of these items."

=== Suspected victims ===
- Billy Ray Bowers, 53, disappeared from Phoenix, Arizona, on September 25, 1988. On September 28, 1989, the body of an unknown man wrapped in a blue tarp was found by a fisherman at McCrea Cove at Elephant Butte Lake in Elephant Butte, New Mexico. No identification was found on him, and it was determined that he had been shot in the back of the head. The unidentified decedent was ultimately identified as Bowers in March 1999 when authorities made dental record comparisons. In 1986, Bowers was a co-owner of Canal Motors, a used car business that was on North Van Buren Street in Phoenix, Arizona. The owners employed Ray, who worked as a mechanic and was described as "very talented," but was also often in conflict with Bowers. While incarcerated, Hendy stated that Ray told her he had killed Bowers and dumped his body in the Elephant Butte River.
- 22-year-old Jill Suzanne Troia was last seen at the Frontier Restaurant in the 2400 block of east Central in Albuquerque, New Mexico, during the late evening of September 30, 1995. She had gone to a bar with friends earlier, then went with her girlfriend Glenda Jean "Jesse" Ray when they left to go to the restaurant. Witnesses reported Jesse and Troia argued. Jesse later told police she left Troia at the Frontier Restaurant and left with her father, Ray, and that she and David went to the Elephant Butte Reservoir in southern New Mexico. Troia has never been heard from again. Ray wrote detailed accounts of sexual tortures and burials of victims, including one in which he described an Asian woman who fit Troia's description.
- Among the possessions associated with victims was a two-page letter dated June 1990 to a young woman named Connie from an Australian man named Mark. According to Ray's journal, Connie was a woman of European descent that he abducted and murdered in December 1995. She was 18 years old, had long blonde hair, a birthmark on her chest, and was 160 cm tall. The Australian Federal Police and FBI conducted an investigation, hoping to locate Mark so that he would be able to identify Connie and her family and friends, but were unable to do so. Her remains have not been located or linked to an existing unidentified or missing person case.
- Sylvia Marie Parker, 22, was a homeless woman living on the shores of Elephant Butte Lake who was an acquaintance of Ray's via his daughter, who supplied her with methamphetamine and cocaine. Parker was also the mother of two children and was living with them in a tent she had borrowed from David. The police later discovered that Parker's boyfriend at the time was Dennis Yancy—one of Ray's "playmates." Parker disappeared on July 5, 1997, when she was abducted and subjected to several days of torture before accomplice Yancy strangled her to death under orders from Ray. Yancy took police to where he disposed of the body with David Parker Ray and Jesse Ray, but the body had been moved. Yancy suspected and the police support the theory that Ray came back to move the body later in case Yancy ever had a softening of his conscience and confessed.
- At 10:30 a.m. on June 30, 1999, Ralph Tutor, a 61-year-old El Paso resident, was fishing in the Elephant Butte Lake. Caught on Tutor's fishing line was an 80-pound "gunnysack" filled with what he thought was "animal flesh". The sack was "split along its seam". He then suspected it was human body parts and alerted the authorities. The gunnysack was determined to contain human flesh, but no organs or bones. This meant that the unidentified victim was mutilated and dismembered before being dumped in the lake. Allegedly, Ray said, "The thing to do is cut them down the belly, scoop out their guts, fill the chest cavity with cement weights, and then use baling wire to wrap them up." Furthermore, state police found bone fragments in Elephant Butte Lake belonging to a human leg in 2011. The DNA identified the victim as a female but she was not linked to any reported missing women.

== Arrest and investigation ==
Cynthia Vigil was abducted from an Albuquerque parking lot by Ray and his girlfriend, Cindy Hendy. She was taken to Elephant Butte, confined to the trailer and tortured. After three days of captivity, Vigil escaped from the trailer on March 22, 1999. To escape, she waited until Ray had gone to work, and then unlocked her chains with keys that Hendy had left on a nearby table. Hendy noticed Vigil's attempt to escape and a fight ensued. During the struggle, Hendy broke a lamp on the captive's head, but Vigil unlocked her chains and stabbed Hendy in the neck with an icepick. Vigil fled while wearing only an iron slave collar and padlocked chains. She ran down the road seeking help, which she got from a nearby homeowner who took her in, comforted her, and called the police. Her escape led officials to the trailer and instigated the capture of Ray and his accomplices. Police detained Ray and Hendy.

Another victim, Angelica Montano, came forward with a similar story to that of Vigil. She said she had been held captive by Ray after Hendy invited her to the house to pick up a cake mix. After being raped and tortured, Montano convinced the pair to release her along the highway. She was picked up near I-25 by an off-duty sheriff's deputy and told him the fragments she could remember through her drug-induced fog. The officer wanted to file a report but Angelica declined.

Police identified another victim, Kelli Garrett, from a videotape which dated from 1996. Garrett was found alive in Colorado after police identified her from a tattoo on her ankle. She testified that she had gotten in a fight with her husband and decided to spend the night playing pool with friends. Ray's daughter, Jesse, who knew Garrett, took her to the Blu-Water Saloon in Truth Or Consequences, and may have drugged the beer she was drinking. She offered Garrett a ride home but instead took Garrett to her father's house. Garrett said she endured two days of torture before Ray drove her back to her home. Ray told her husband that he had found the woman incoherent on a beach. Her husband did not believe that she could not remember where she had been and Garrett said she did not know what to tell the police and so did not contact them. Her husband sued for divorce and Garrett moved to Colorado. She was later interviewed on Cold Case Files about her ordeal.

The FBI sent one hundred agents to examine Ray's property and surroundings, but no identifiable human remains were found. While awaiting trial, Ray spoke to FBI profilers and said that he was fascinated by the kidnapping of Colleen Stan and other sexually motivated kidnappings. The FBI had spoken to Ray as early as 1989 in connection with his business that manufactured and sold bondage-related sexual devices.

== Trials, convictions and aftermath ==
A judge ruled that the cases for crimes against Cynthia Vigil, Angelica Montano, and Kelli Garrett would be severed, meaning that Ray would be tried for each separately. Prosecutors said this damaged their case as each woman's story would otherwise have corroborated and bolstered the others' accounts. The judge also ruled much of the evidence found in the trailer during the 1999 raid could not be admitted in the Garrett or Montano cases, including Ray's audio tape in which he gave detailed descriptions of his abducting and torturing habits. The first trial, for crimes against Kelli Garrett, resulted in a mistrial after two jurors said they found her story unbelievable. Ray's defense was that the sex trailer was part of Ray's fantasy life and any sex was consensual. After a retrial, Ray was convicted on all 12 counts.

A week into his trial for crimes against Vigil, Ray agreed to a plea bargain and was sentenced in 2001 to 224 years in prison for numerous offenses in the abduction and sexual torture of three young women at his Elephant Butte home. The plea deal was to obtain leniency for his daughter. Prosecutors stated that the surviving victims had approved of the deal. Ray's daughter, Jesse, was charged with kidnapping and criminal sexual penetration. She pled no contest and received a 30-month sentence with an additional five years to be served on probation.

In 1999, 27-year-old accomplice Dennis Roy Yancy pleaded guilty to the 1997 murder of 22-year-old Marie Parker in Elephant Butte. Yancy confessed to helping Jesse lure Parker into captivity in her father's trailer. Yancy said that Parker was tortured and that Ray forced him to strangle the woman to death. Prosecutors noted that no forensic evidence was found to tie Parker to the Rays. Yancy was also charged with kidnapping, two counts of conspiracy to commit a crime, and tampering with evidence. He was sentenced to 30 years. The Rays were not charged in Parker's murder. In 2010, Yancy was paroled after serving 11 years in prison, but the release was delayed by difficulties in negotiating a plan for residence. Three months after his release in 2011, Yancy was charged with violating his parole. He was remanded to custody, where he remained until 2021, serving a part of his original sentence.

In 2000, Cindy Hendy, an accomplice who testified against Ray, received a sentence of 36 years for her role in the crimes. She was scheduled to receive parole in 2017. She was released on July 15, 2019, after serving the first two years of her parole in prison.

== Death ==
On May 28, 2002, Ray was taken to the Lea County Correctional Facility, in Hobbs, New Mexico, to be questioned by state police. He died of a heart attack before the interrogation took place.

== Aftermath ==
Later, Cynthia Vigil, along with Christine Barber, founded Street Safe New Mexico, a volunteer harm reduction nonprofit that works with sex workers and other vulnerable people living on the street.
