= Minnesota Correctional Facility – Rush City =

Prison in Minnesota, United States

Coordinates: 45°42′32″N 92°56′53″W

Minnesota Correctional Facility – Rush City (MCF-Rush City)
- Interactive map of Minnesota Correctional Facility – Rush City (MCF-Rush City)
- Location: 7600 525th Street, Rush City, Minnesota
- Status: Operational
- Security class: Close security
- Population: 940
- Opened: January 2000
- Managed by: Minnesota Department of Corrections
- Warden: Lisa Stenseth

The Minnesota Correctional Facility – Rush City is a prison for men operated by the Minnesota Department of Corrections in Rush City, Chisago County, Minnesota.

Rush City is the state's newest prison, opened in January 2000. The $89 million project stands as the largest single structure in the county, employs about 350 workers, and at the ten-year mark in 2010 was reported to have met local expectations as a quiet and relatively well-run prison.

But in June 2010, 27-year-old inmate Xavius Scullark-Johnson died after a string of overnight seizures while held in Rush City, where he was denied emergency medical care. In deteriorating health for months, he anticipated his own death in letters to his mother. His family sued the Department of Corrections, the contracted health care provider Corizon, and the individuals involved. The DOC agreed to settle the suit for $400,000 and promised additional training.

== Notable Inmates ==
Inmate Name	Register Number	Status	Details
Nicholas David Kraus	265997	Serving a 20 year sentence for Second-Degree Unintentional murder. Scheduled for release in 2034.	Committed the crime known as the Killing of Deona Marie Knajdek in 2021 at a protest.
Timothy Allen Amacher	266331	Serving an 18 year sentence. Scheduled for release in 2034.	Attempted to murder forensic scientist Nicole Lenway, his ex-girlfriend.
