= Central New Mexico Correctional Facility =

Prison in New Mexico, United States

- Interactive map of Central New Mexico Correctional Facility
- Location: Los Lunas, New Mexico; 34.790889°N 106.763018°W
- Status: Operational
- Security class: Level 1; Level 2; Level 3
- Capacity: 1,050+
- Opened: 1980
- Managed by: New Mexico Corrections Department
- Warden: Jessica Vigil Richards
- Website: Official website

The Central New Mexico Correctional Facility (CNMCF) minimum and medium-security prison in Los Lunas, New Mexico, United States. Built in 1980, CNMCF has an inmate capacity of more than 1,050, it houses level 1, level 2, and level 3 inmates. The facility is also home to a geriatric unit, Mental Health Treatment Center (MHTC), Long Term Care Unit (LTCU), Reception and Diagnostic Center (RDC), and Restrictive Housing Unit (RHU).

== The Farm ==
"The Farm" is a level 1, minimum-security housing unit, located on more than 1,000 acres adjacent to the main prison complex. The Farm can house 336 inmates. The Farm originally opened in 1940 with over 2,000 acres as a farm with the goal of providing food to inmates housed there and the Penitentiary of New Mexico, in Santa Fe. After closing in 2020 due to low enrollment and staffing shortages, The Farm was reopened by the New Mexico Corrections Department (NMCD) in June 2025.

The facility has a barbershop, library, computer lab, chapel, farmland, educational and vocational spaces. The Farm offers educational, vocational, and reentry programs for inmates, including GED preparation, substance abuse prevention, job readiness training, and vocational courses. The Farm also has a dog training program, in which inmates train dogs from local dog shelters. Inmates assigned to the unit also participate in maintenance and operational work throughout the facility, including carpentry, laundry, library services, and groundskeeping. Inmates are chosen to live in The Farm through conduct and participating in rehabilitative and educational programs.
