= Northwest New Mexico Correctional Facility =

Prison in New Mexico, United States

Coordinates: 35°08′26″N 107°49′02″W

- Interactive map of Northwest New Mexico Correctional Facility
- Location: 1700 E Old Highway 66 Grants, New Mexico
- Status: open
- Security class: mixed
- Capacity: 611
- Opened: 1989
- Managed by: CoreCivic

The Northwest New Mexico Correctional Facility (NNMCF), formerly the New Mexico Women's Correctional Facility (NMWCF), is a privately owned prison for men, located in Grants, Cibola County, New Mexico.

The prison is owned by CoreCivic and operated by the New Mexico Corrections Department. It opened in 1989 as the first privatized women's prison in the U.S.

In late 2015 state officials announced a plan to transfer all female inmates out of the facility, and to consolidate New Mexico's estimated population of 1200 sex offenders here. In August 2016 it was renamed as Northwest New Mexico Correctional Center.
