= Northeast New Mexico Detention Facility =

Prison in New Mexico, United States

Coordinates: 36°26′07″N 103°07′24″W

- Interactive map of Northeast New Mexico Detention Facility
- Location: 185 Dr. Michael Jenkins Road Clayton, New Mexico
- Status: open
- Security class: medium
- Capacity: 625
- Opened: August 2008
- Managed by: GEO Group

The Northeast New Mexico Detention Facility is a privately operated medium-security state prison for men, located in Clayton, Union County, New Mexico. The facility was financed and is owned by the Town of Clayton. Operator GEO Group houses a maximum of 625 state inmates, under a contract with the New Mexico Corrections Department.

It opened in August 2008.
