= Guadalupe County Correctional Facility =

Prison in New Mexico, United States

Coordinates: 34°54′30″N 104°42′11″W

- Interactive map of Guadalupe County Correctional Facility
- Location: Santa Rosa, New Mexico
- Status: Operational
- Security class: Level 3
- Opened: 1997
- Managed by: New Mexico Corrections Department
- Warden: Matt Montoya
- Website: Official website

The Guadalupe County Correctional Facility is a medium-security state prison for men located in Santa Rosa, Guadalupe County, New Mexico, owned by GEO Group and operated by the New Mexico Corrections Department (NMCD).

== Notable Inmates ==
Nehemiah Griego - Perpetrator of the 2013 South Valley homicides

Nathaniel Jouett - Perpetrator of the 2017 Clovis Library shooting
