= Clovis library shooting =

2017 mass shooting in New Mexico, U.S.

- CCTV footage of Jouett (black) inside the library
- Location: 34.4053°N 103.20456°W; 701 North Main Street, Clovis, New Mexico, U.S.
- Date: August 28, 2017; 4:17 p.m. (MDT; UTC−6)
- Target: Clovis-Carver Public Library
- Attack type: Mass shooting, double homicide
- Weapons: .380-caliber Bersa Thunder 380 Plus pistol; .45-caliber Springfield Armory XD handgun
- Deaths: 2
- Injuries: 4
- Perpetrator: Nathaniel Jouett
- Motive: Bullying, mental illness, suicidal thoughts
- Charges: 2 concurrent life sentences, with the possibility of parole, plus 40 years in prison.

On August 28, 2017, a mass shooting occurred at the Clovis-Carver Library, a public library in downtown Clovis, New Mexico, United States. The gunman fatally shot two people and injured four others. He was identified as Nathaniel Jouett, a 16-year-old student at Clovis High School. Jouett cited bullying, mental health problems, and suicidal ideation as his motives and was sentenced to two concurrent life sentences.

== Shooting ==
On the day of the shooting, Jouett recorded three videos at his home where he announced his planned massacre. In the videos, he apologized for his upcoming actions and tried to explain his motivations, citing various factors including bullying, mental illness, and suicidal thoughts.

Jouett entered the library at 4:15 pm MST on Monday, August 28, 2017, and went into the restroom. There, Jouett uploaded a photo of his camera bag, containing his father's guns and ammunition, to his social media. The uploaded photo also displayed a time "4:10 PM" over the original photo. A caption attached to the photo read "It begins". Shortly after he walked out of the restroom, he pulled out the .380 caliber handgun from his bag and opened fire. At the time of the shooting, it was unclear how many people were in the library and Jouett seemed to fire randomly as individuals and parents with children tried to flee. In the span of six seconds, Jouett rapidly fired 14 rounds from the .380 caliber handgun indiscriminately. During those six seconds, he fatally shot two people and injured three others, including a 10-year-old child. Surveillance footage captured Jouett walking around the library, shouting at people to run, after he fired those 14 rounds. Eventually, Jouett placed the .380-caliber handgun back in the bag he was carrying and pulled out the .45 caliber handgun. He proceeded to wound one more person before firing four times through a door trying to hit someone who barricaded themselves. In total, he fired 14 rounds from the .380 caliber handgun and six rounds from the .45 caliber handgun. Jouett wandered around the library without firing any more shots and eventually encountered a man who had returned to the library while on the phone with 911. Jouett told the man to put down his phone. The man told Jouett that someone was looking for him. The suspect turned around and threatened a mother and child before walking towards where the man was pointing at.

According to an eyewitness, the gunman entered the library and shot into the carpet, shouting "Run! Why aren't you running? I'm shooting at you! Run!" before he began to move about the room shooting at people. Another witness claimed that Jouett looked happy, that "He was just laughing, smiling the whole time, until he came up real close to me, and then he put on that mean look."

Police received multiple emergency calls. About 15 minutes after the first call came in, police received a call from the suspect's father, who told them that the suspect had taken his father's guns from the safe where they were kept, and left the house.

Jouett surrendered immediately when police arrived; he did not struggle with the arresting officers. He told police that he had been planning an attack for a while, and that he had intended to shoot up the school before killing himself.

== Victims ==
Two people, Wanda Walters, 61, and Kristina Carter, 48, both library employees, were killed. Kristina Carter was the youth librarian and Wanda Walters worked at the circulation desk. Four people were wounded, who were identified as Howard Jones, 53, Jessica Thron, 30, Alexis Molina, 20, and Noah Molina, 10. Alexis was shot three times while shielding her brother, who was shot once, from gunfire.

== Perpetrator ==
Nathaniel Ray Jouett, 16 at the time of the shooting, was a student at Clovis High School. He was bullied at school, according to his girlfriend. Three months prior to the shooting, Jouett started attending Living Word Church of God, and had suicidal thoughts.

== Legal proceedings ==
According to Public Radio station KUNM, although the Associated Press usually refrains from using the names of juvenile defendants, it chose to publish Nathaniel Jouett's name "because of the seriousness of the crime and because authorities are seeking adult sanctions."

Curry County District Attorney Andrea Reeb announced prior to the trial that she intended to prosecute Jouett as an adult. The suspect made his first court appearance on August 31, 2017. Jouett was indicted on September 8, 2017, for two counts of first-degree murder, seven counts of child abuse, four counts of aggravated battery, and twenty counts of assault with intent to commit a violent felony.

In April 2018, a judge denied a defense request to transfer Jouett from prison to a juvenile treatment facility, and ordered that he undergo a mental "evaluation and assessment" so that his mental health needs could be addressed. On October 17, 2018, Jouett pleaded guilty in the shooting. On February 15, 2019, Jouett was sentenced to two concurrent life sentences, with the possibility of parole, plus 40 years in prison. Jouett is currently incarcerated at the Guadalupe County Correctional Center. Under his original sentence, Jouett would have been eligible for parole after serving 34 years. Under a 2023 law restricting life sentences for juveniles, he will now be eligible for parole after serving 25 years.

Family members of two of the wounded victims filed a lawsuit against the perpetrator's parents and his psychologist.

== See also ==
- 2026 Chico library shooting: a similar shooting that occurred at a public library in Chico, California, on June 22, 2026.
