= New Mexico Corrections Department =

State agency

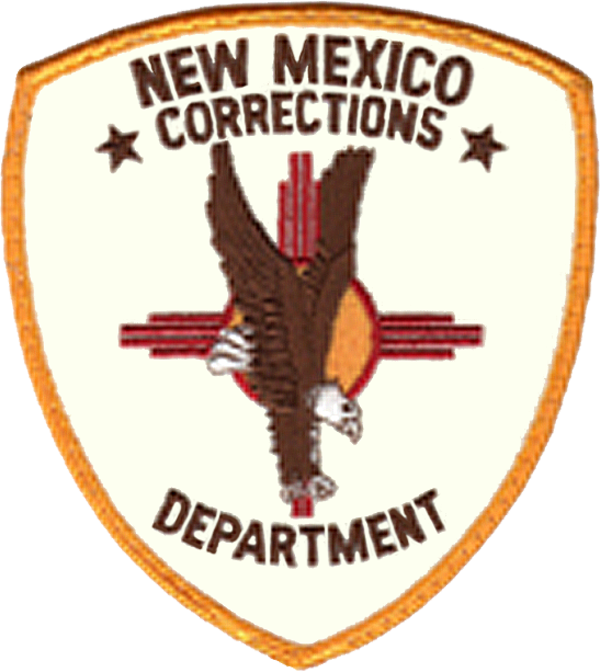

Agency overview
- Jurisdiction: Government of New Mexico
- Headquarters: Santa Fe County, New Mexico, U.S.
- Agency executive: Alisha Tafoya Lucero, Secretary
- Website: cd.nm.gov

The New Mexico Corrections Department (NMCD; Spanish: Departamento de Correcciones de Nuevo México) is a state agency of New Mexico, headquartered in unincorporated Santa Fe County, near Santa Fe. It the department operates corrections facilities, probation and parole programs, a prisoner reentry services, and an offender database.

== Facilities and security levels ==
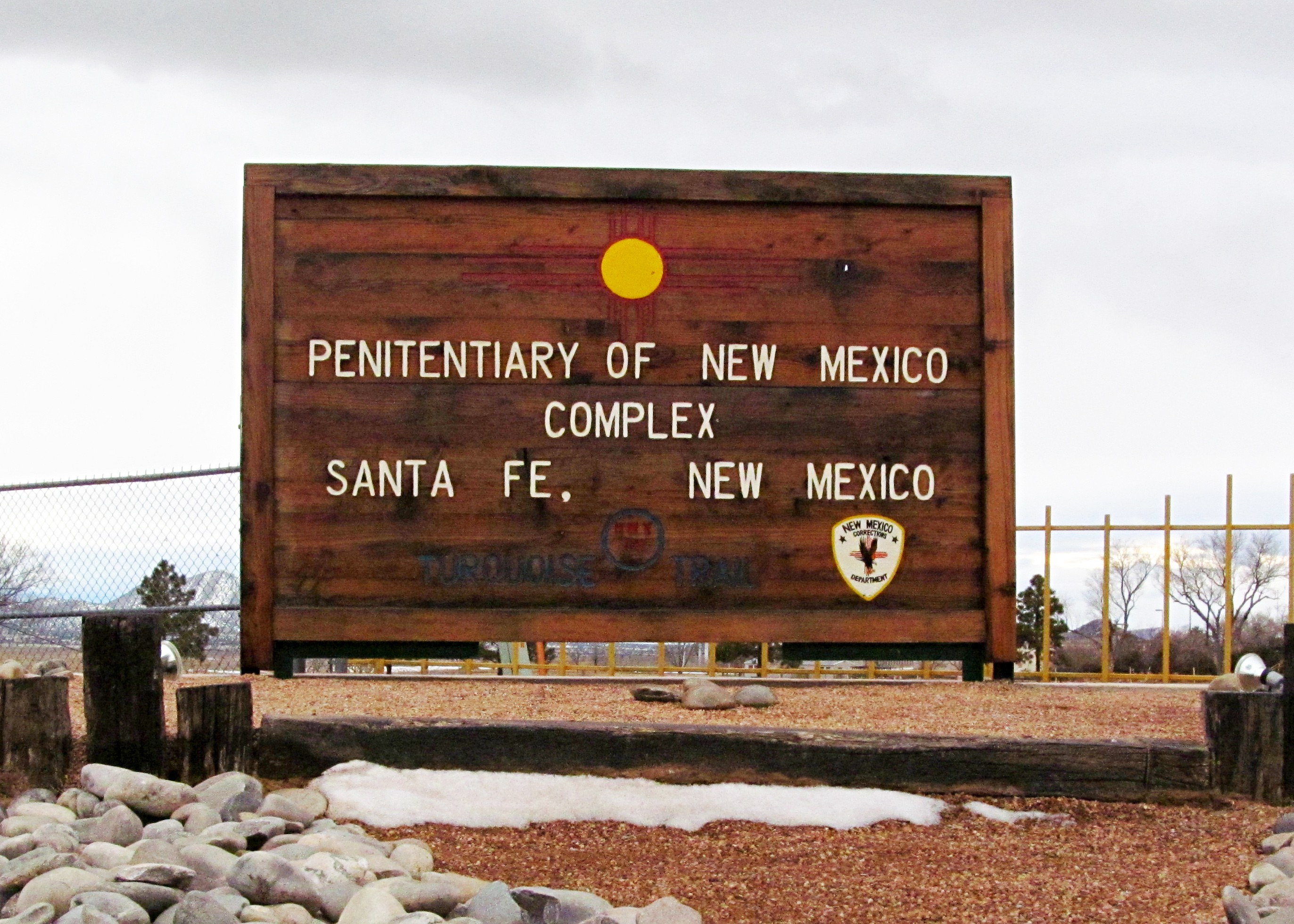
Penitentiary of New Mexico

This list includes detention facilities in New Mexico which house state prisoners. There are no federal prisons in New Mexico and the list does not include county jails located in the state.

Prison	County	Locality	Inmate capacity	Level I	Level II	Level III	Level IV
Northeast New Mexico Correctional Facility	Union County	Clayton		No	No	Yes	No
Central New Mexico Correctional Facility	Valencia County	Los Lunas	1,110	Yes	Yes	Yes	Yes
Guadalupe County Correctional Facility	Guadalupe County	Santa Rosa	600	No	No	Yes	No
Otero County Prison Facility (Note: Operated by the Management and Training Corporation)	Otero County	Chaparral	1,420	No	No	No	Yes
Penitentiary of New Mexico	Santa Fé County	Santa Fe	790	No	Yes	No	Yes
Roswell Correctional Center	Chaves County	Roswell	340	No	Yes	No	No
Southern New Mexico Correctional Facility	Doña Ana County	Las Cruces	764	No	Yes	Yes	No
Springer Correctional Center (Note: The former New Mexico Boys School opened on October 1, 1909. The New Mexico Children, Youth, and Families Department (CYFD) closed it in 2005 and was transferred to the New Mexico Corrections Department. It became the Springer Correctional Center.)	Colfax County	Springer	296	No	Yes	No	No
Northwest New Mexico Correctional Facility (Note: Formerly New Mexico Women's Correctional Facility)	Cibola County	Grants	611	Yes	Yes	Yes	Yes
Western New Mexico Correctional Facility	Cibola County	Grants	440	No	No	Yes	Yes

== 1980 riot ==
See more: New Mexico State Penitentiary riot

The Penitentiary of New Mexico Prison Riot, which took place on the weekend of February 2 and 3, 1980, was the most violent prison riot to date in the history of the American prison system. During an inmate takeover lasting only 36 hours, 33 inmates were killed and 12 officers were held hostage by prisoners who had escaped from a dormitory in the main unit, the southern half of the prison. Inmates were brutally butchered, dismembered, burned alive with torches and hung up in the cell house for display. Although taking many years, this riot eventually led to several changes in New Mexico's prison system, including a modern inmate classification system modeled after the U.S. Federal Bureau of Prisons, as well as the closing of the prison cellhouses and dormitories that were in use at the time of the riot.

== See also ==
- List of law enforcement agencies in New Mexico
- List of United States state correction agencies
- List of U.S. state prisons
- Prison
- New Mexico State Penitentiary riot
