= Penitentiary of New Mexico =

State-run maximum security prison in New Mexico

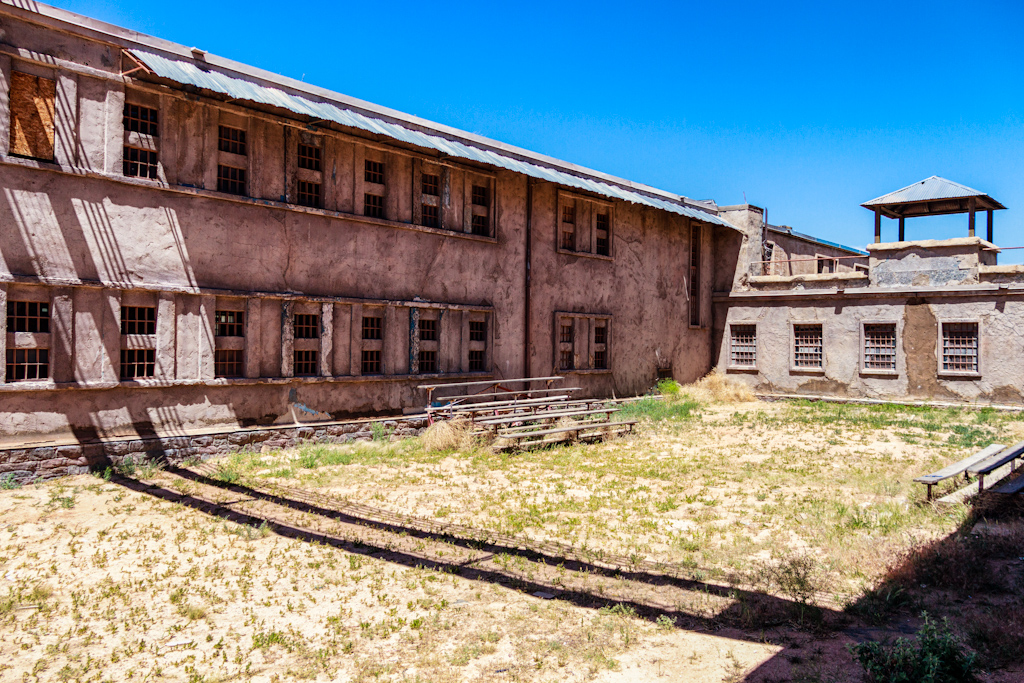
- Interactive map of Penitentiary of New Mexico
- Location: Santa Fe County, New Mexico; 35°33′43″N 106°03′37″W
- Status: Operational
- Security class: Maximum Security
- Population: 790
- Opened: 1885
- Managed by: New Mexico Corrections Department
- Warden: Chelsea White

Notable prisoners
- Terry D. Clark

The Penitentiary of New Mexico (PNM) is a men's maximum-security prison located in unincorporated Santa Fe County, 15 miles (24 km) south of central Santa Fe, on New Mexico State Road 14. It is operated by the New Mexico Corrections Department.

The complex consists of three separate facilities: Level V (opened in 1985), Level VI (opened in 1985) and Level II (opened in 1990) for the minimum restrict facility, based on New Mexico adoption of the Federal Bureau of Prisons system for inmate classification and restriction. The regular daily population is about 790 inmates, whose average age is 32.

The Level VI Supermax site contained New Mexico's death row; convicted murderer Terry Clark was executed in 2001, becoming the only execution in the state between the reinstatement of the death penalty in 1976 and its repeal in 2009.

== History ==
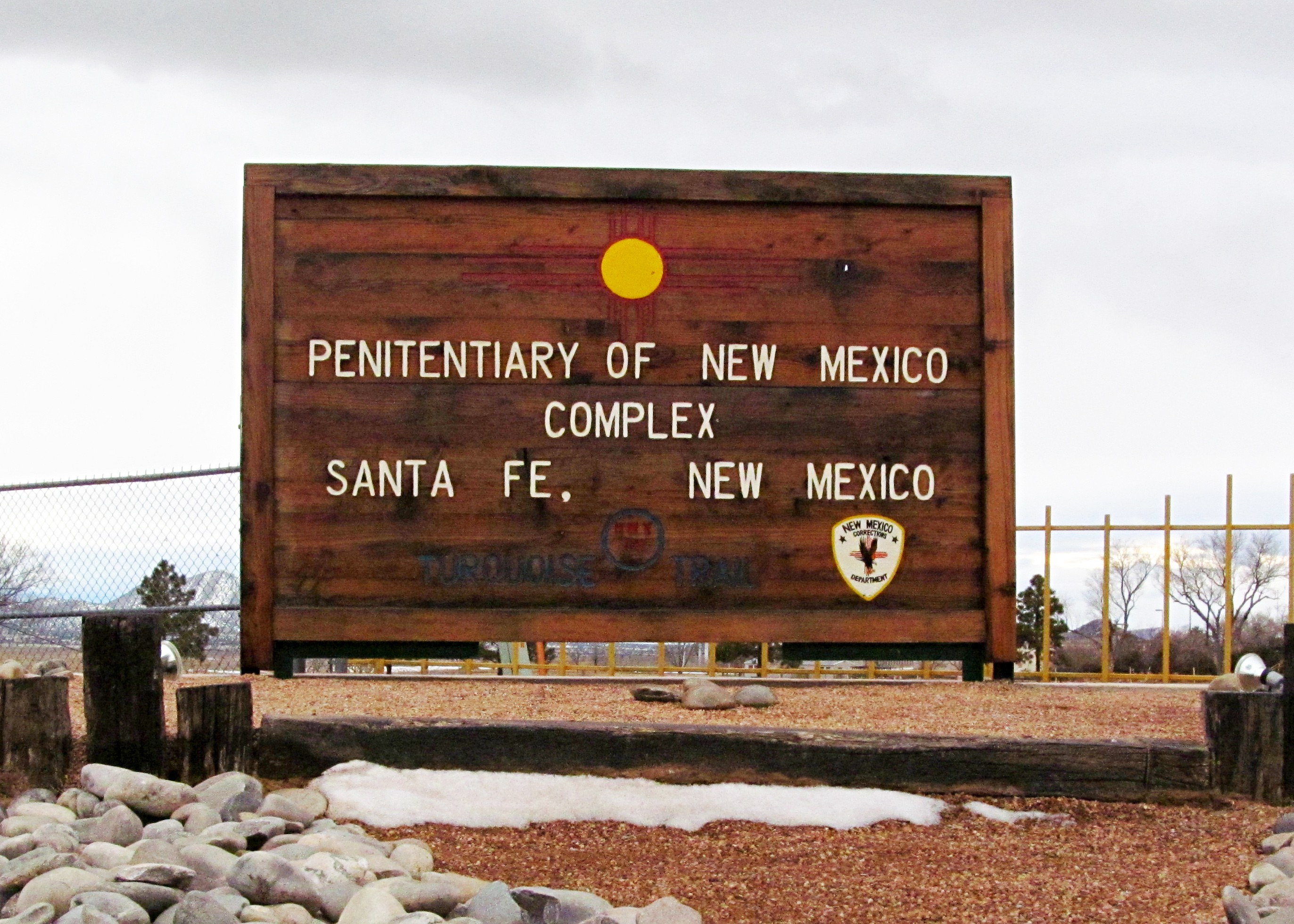
The entrance to the Penitentiary of New Mexico, as seen from Highway 14

Opened in 1885, the New Mexico Penitentiary had been authorized by Congress since 1853. The design of the original facility on Cerrillos Road was based on the same plans used for Sing Sing and Joliet. A popular (but untrue) legend holds that the citizens of Santa Fe were given the choice between acquiring either the penitentiary or the first university in the region, but chose the penitentiary. The territorial legislature authorized the prison in 1884, but the University of New Mexico was not authorized until 1889.

The first prison industry produced bricks. Beginning in 1903, New Mexico became the first western state to employ prisoners in building highways.

On 19 July 1922, prisoners at the penitentiary rioted against overcrowding, the poor food, and the use of excessive force by the prison authorities. When the inmates refused to return to their cells, the tower guards opened fire, killing one inmate and injuring five others. In the report following the riot, the prison authorities were blamed for lack of experience, and failure to understand how to control a prison population.

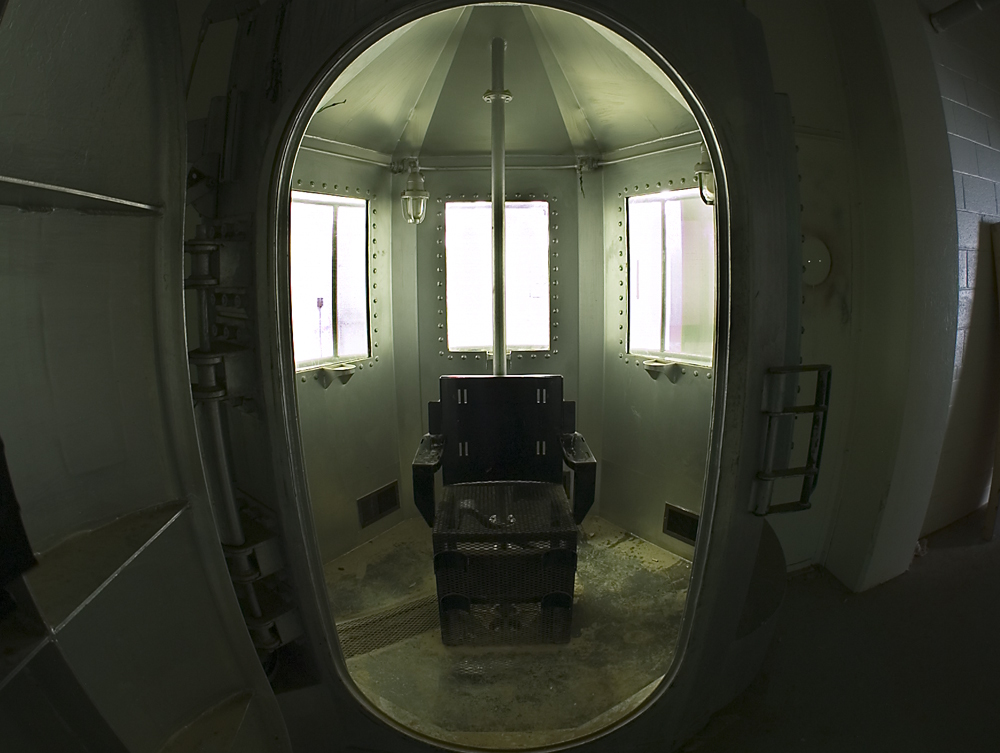
The penitentiary's defunct gas chamber.

The second riot was 15 June 1953. Inmates protesting the use of excessive force seized Deputy Warden Ralph Tahash and twelve guards and held them hostage. In the resulting melee, guards killed two inmates and wounded a number of others.

This second riot led to the construction in 1956 of a new facility about 11 miles south of the original prison, in open country along State Road 14, which came to be called "the main unit." The original 1885 facility was demolished shortly thereafter. Aside from the street name "Pen Road," no trace remains of the original penitentiary.

In the new 1956 facility, between the years 1967 and 1970, the population was below capacity and dorm rooms were used as classrooms. Warden J.E. Baker used Federal funds from President Lyndon Johnson's War on Poverty to address prison reform. It was called Project Newgate and the money was used to support programs such as prisoner education, job training, and community service.

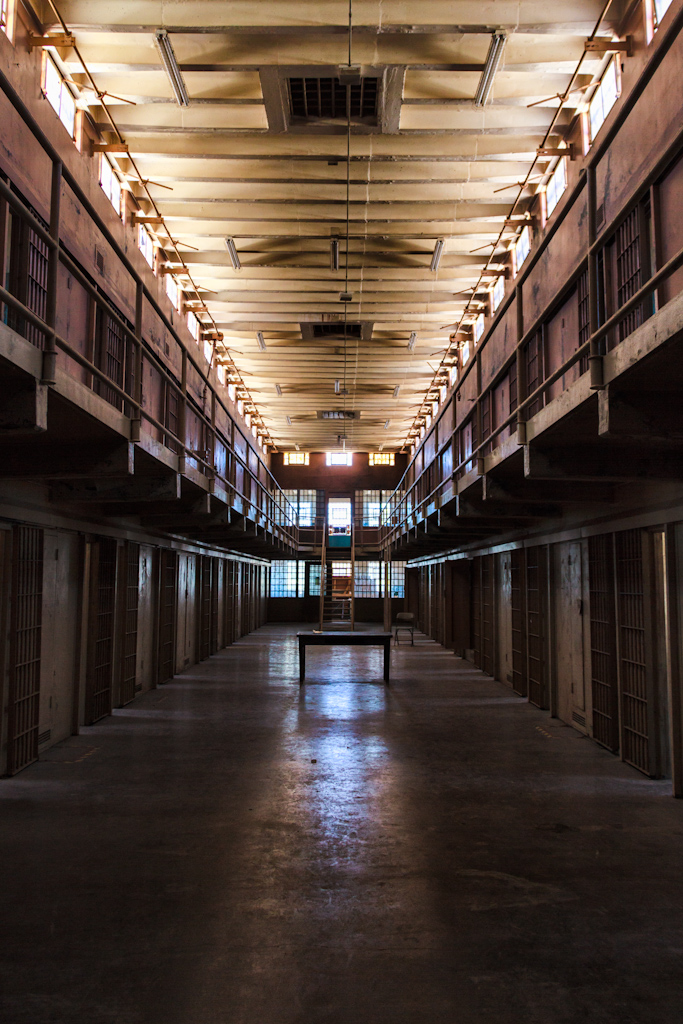
Cell block in “Old Main”.

In 1980, Cell Block 4, at the far northern end from the Control Center, was the scene of the most violent prison riot in the correctional history of the United States. Over two days 33 inmates were killed and 12 officers were held hostage by prisoners who had escaped from crowded dormitories located at the southern end from the Control Center. Men were brutally butchered, dismembered, and decapitated and hung up on the cells and burned alive. This section of the prison was closed in 1998 and is now referred to as the "Old Main."

Systemic reforms after the riot and the Duran v. King consent decree, including implementation of the Bureau Classification System under Cabinet Secretary Joe Williams, led to the modern New Mexico prison system. The prison is reputedly haunted, with numerous unexplained phenomena, from prison doors opening and closing of their own accord, to ghostly voices and footsteps.

== See also ==
- New Mexico State Penitentiary riot
