= Prison healthcare =

Medical treatment in penal institutions

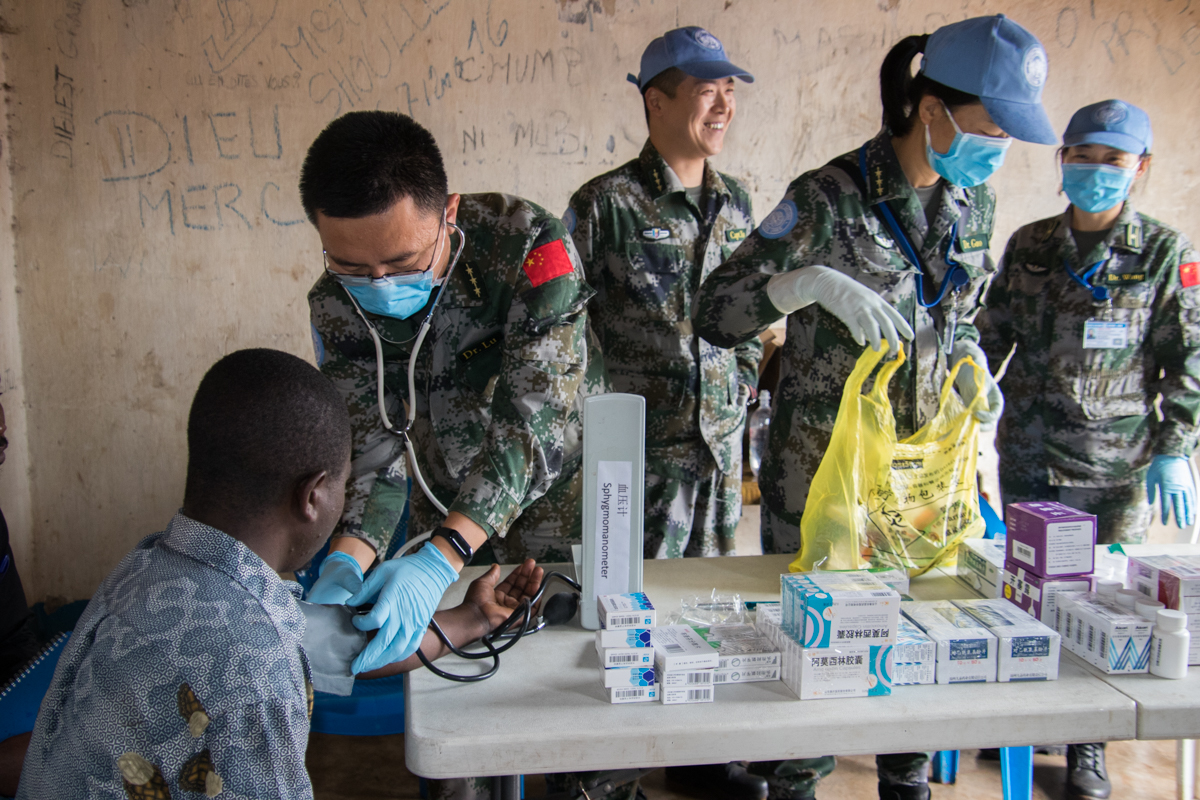
Military and MONUSCO medical staff performing medical consultations at a Kabare Territory prison in the Democratic Republic of the Congo

Prison healthcare is the medical specialty in which healthcare providers care for people in prisons and jails. Prison healthcare is a relatively new specialty that developed alongside the adaptation of prisons into modern disciplinary institutions. Enclosed prison populations are particularly vulnerable to infectious diseases such as hepatitis, tuberculosis, AIDS or HIV, and Covid-19. Incarcerated people also have higher rates of chronic medical conditions than the general population including arthritis, asthma, hypertension, cervical cancer, and mental health issues such as depression, mania, anxiety, substance use disorders and post-traumatic stress disorder. Many environmental factors specific to jails or prisons also pose a significant health risk to incarcerated people, including solitary confinement, overcrowding, exposure to extremes of temperature due to lack of air conditioning or heating, noise pollution, lack of privacy, and lack of ability to make medical decisions (lack of autonomy). These conditions link prison healthcare to issues of public health, preventive healthcare, and hygiene. Prisoner dependency on provided healthcare raises unique problems in medical ethics.

== Scope of field ==
Prison populations create specific medical needs, based on the communal nature of prison life and differing rates of imprisonment for different demographics. For example, general population ageing has increased the number of elderly prisoners in need of geriatric healthcare. In addition, treatment for mental health, sexually transmitted infections like HIV, and substance abuse are all important elements of prison healthcare, as well as knowledge of public health methods.

Universal screening for sexually transmitted infections (STIs) in prison populations has been shown to improve infection detection rates and uptake in treatments. In the United States, inmates infected with HIV have superior access to treatment and care than the general population. HIV infected prisoners typically see their condition improve while incarcerated and oftentimes reduce their HIV to the point that they have undetectable viral loads. In the United States, universal screening for sexually transmitted infections, while allowing prisoners the opportunity to opt out of screening (rather than only screening prisoners who display symptoms) significantly increased detection rates of STIs. In New York City, such universal screening increased the rate of chlamydia detection by 1636% and gonorrhea detection by 885%. After instituting universal screening, the rate of chlamydia in New York City overall increased by 59%.

The separation of prison healthcare from other medical specialties and healthcare systems leads to its isolation and stigmatization as a field, despite some countries' promise for "equivalence" in healthcare between prison and non-prison patients. Some hospitals have a prison ward which is used to treat people held in police custody or convicted criminals. Some prison wards specialize in treating patients with severe mental health issues.

Healthcare policy and services in prisons recognise the differences in health needs between women and men. Women in prison have specific needs in relation to menstruation, pregnancy, post-partum health, contraception, mental health and menopause. The United Nations Rules for the Treatment of Women Prisoners and Non-custodial Measures for Women Offenders (2010) outline standards for care of women offenders and prisoners and are known as the 'Bangkok Rules'.

== Health effects of incarceration ==
The health effects on persons who are incarcerated are numerous. Environmental conditions specific to jails and prisons can lead to significant harms including death. Solitary confinement is associated with psychological harm, cardiovascular disease, loneliness, self harm and suicide. The risk of death after release from solitary confinement is also increased. The risk of death within the first two weeks of release from prison is 13 times that of the general population.

Overcrowding in prisons is associated with the spread of infectious diseases including Covid-19 and tuberculosis. Studies have shown that incarcerated people are much more likely to be infected with and die from Covid-19, with a 5 times higher infection rate and a three times higher death rate. Jails and prisons are also significant drivers of Covid-19 spread in the community. A study showed that 15% of all Covid cases in the US state of Illinois were from people in and out of prisons and jails and another study showed a 9% higher Covid prevalence in counties with prisons as compared to counties without prisons. Reducing prison populations and vaccine education have been shown to reduce Covid-19 infection rates in incarcerated peoples. Incarcerated people also have a higher prevalence of chronic infectious diseases such as HIV and hepatitis C. Psychiatric illnesses including depression, post-traumatic stress disorder and anxiety disorders as well as self-harm and suicide are also more common in incarcerated populations. Having a history of incarceration is associated with reduced treatment uptake and an increased risk of death in women with HIV.

Disabilities due to aging are much more common in prison populations and have an earlier age of onset. Prisoners develop hearing impairment, urinary incontinence, and difficulties in their activities of daily living (ADLs, such as bathing, cooking, cleaning, and other aspects of self care) earlier than older adults in the community. Adults who are 55 or older also have a much higher risk of falls or impairments in ADLs if they were incarcerated earlier in their lives.

Transgender people who are incarcerated have higher rates of physical and sexual violence, mental health disease, self-harm, and suicide.

Prisoners in facilities without air-conditioning are at a greatly increased risk of heat related deaths (such as heat stroke).

Some policy changes that have been recommended to improve the care of prisoners include improving the transition from prison healthcare to community healthcare upon release from prison. Case managers, including case managers who themselves have been incarcerated, have been shown to make the transition easier for prisoners. Other interventions proposed for incarcerated people include universal Medicaid (or other state administered healthcare insurance programs) for all prisoners, increased regulatory oversight and accountability for prison healthcare agencies (including site inspections, healthcare quality mandates, and standards of care), and compassionate release for prisoners with life-limiting diseases.

== History ==
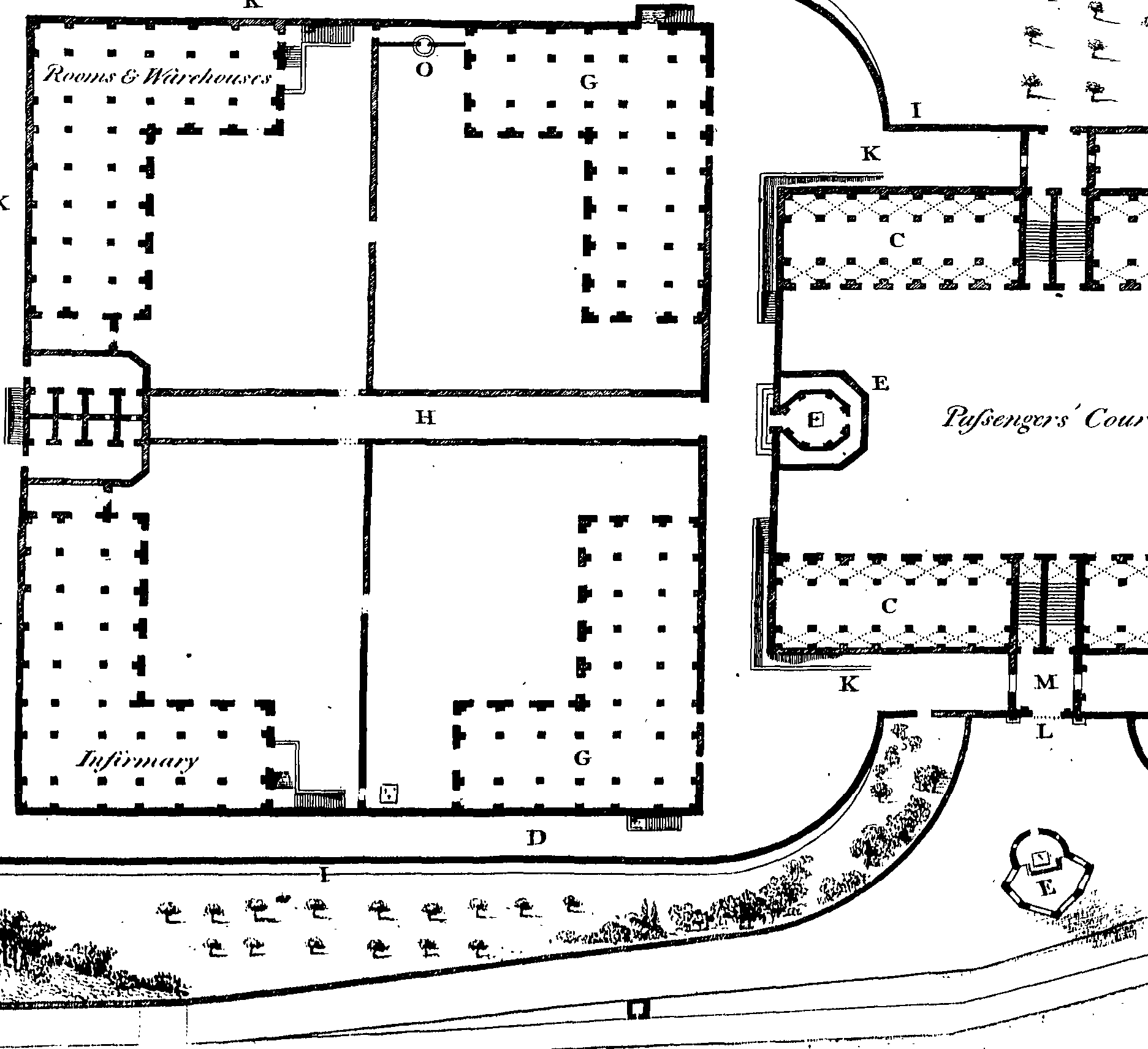
Print from John Howard's An Account of the Principal Lazarettos in Europe, 1791, showing the floor plan of a prison with a designated infirmary at bottom left

Before 1775, imprisonment was rarely used as a punishment for crime. Since that year, however, incarceration rates have grown exponentially, creating the need for physicians in correctional institutions. Aside from medical care, prisoners were often used by doctors to conduct medical research and conduct teaching, a practice amenable to evidence-based medical practices that prefer scientific analysis of pathology, rather than relying on self-reported patient accounts.

Prison medicine began, in its most rudimentary form, in Victorian England, under the health reforms promoted by wealthy philanthropist and devout ascetic John Howard and his collaborator, well-to-do Quaker physician John Fothergill. Another early development in the history of prison healthcare was the work of Louis-René Villermé (1782–1863), a physician and pioneering hygienist whose study, Des Prisons, was published in 1820. Doctors often had to pass judgment on whether patients were malingering to avoid labor—a practice continued on slave plantations in the US. The work of Villermé and other French hygienists was an inspiration to German, American, and British public health leaders and spurred an overhaul in the conditions in which prisoners were held. Historically, prison healthcare services have been designed for the majority male prison population and frequently fail to meet basic needs of women.

== Training ==
Prison healthcare is not currently a primary component of medical education, although academic medical centers are major providers of prison healthcare. In the 21st century, little has been published on curricula for prison healthcare, and few textbooks exist. Prisons are a complicated, stigmatized environment to practice medicine, which makes it difficult to develop specific training programs for them. It is also hard for prisoners to receive the best medical care because they are frequently relocated and often serve short sentences. In one pilot prison-healthcare rotation in the United States, students believed they benefited from exposure to a diverse patient population although the prison's remote location and lack of organized schedule made the experience difficult.

== Ethics and rights ==
The secondary status of healthcare in prisons and the marginalization and dependency most prisoners experience as a "captive population" pose medical ethics dilemmas for doctors practicing in prisons. Feminist theorist and prison abolitionist Andrea J. Pitts argues that the punitive purpose of prisons prevents most doctors from adequately treating and caring for prisoner patients.In addition, the press has recently become interested in uncovering the unequal treatment of prisoners, highlighting how some prisoners receive special treatment. As a result, any major and costly improvements to prison health initiatives may face backlash from the public, who see prisoners as undeserving of such advantages. Doctors' and medical centers' increased reliance on prisons for providing access to patients ultimately creates a dual loyalty problem, as doctors are forced to balance the medical needs of their patients against the institutional needs of prisons and hospitals. These dilemmas, like organ donation in the United States prison population, make it difficult for doctors to provide patient-centered care in prisons.

The UN Nelson Mandela Rules hold that prison healthcare should be provided by national health services and not by "prison authorities or judicial institutions".

Oftentimes, medical research and studies conducted by doctors on prisoners were unethical and led to detrimental health effects for these prisoners. A prime example occurred from 1913 to 1951 when Doctor Leo Stanley—a member of the eugenicist movement—served as the chief surgeon at San Quentin State Prison. Stanley had an interest in the field of endocrinology, and he believed that the effects of aging consequently lead to a higher propensity for criminality, weak morality, and undesirable physical attributes. Stanley thus decided to test his theory that by transplanting testicles from younger men into older men, these older men's manhood would be restored. He began by using the testicles of younger executed prisoners—before moving onto using the testicles of livestock such as goats and deer—and grafting these into the bodies of living San Quentin prisoners. By the end of his time at San Quentin, Stanley performed around 10,000 testicular procedures.

Another example of the unethical experimentation on prisoners is the case of Doctor Albert Kligman, a famous dermatologist at the University of Pennsylvania who is more known for his discovery of Retin-A. Kligman experimented on prisoners for 20 years, starting in 1951. In 1965, Kligman exposed 75 prisoners at Holmesburg Detention Center and House of Correction in Pennsylvania to high doses of dioxin, the main poisonous contaminant in Agent Orange—a military herbicide and defoliant chemical. Kligman exposed these prisoners to a dosage 468 times greater than that in the Dow Chemical Protocol (Dow Chemical paid Kligman to conduct these experiments to analyze the effects of this Vietnam War-era chemical warfare agent). While the records of these experiments were destroyed, there is proof that this was not the only time Kligman experimented on prisoners. Kligman, luring prisoners with compensation ranging from $10 to $300, used prisoners as subjects in wound healing studies by exposing them to unapproved products such as deodorants and foot powders. These prisoners were not fully informed about the potential side effects of these experiments and reported experiencing long-term pain, scars, blisters, cysts, and rashes from these experiments.

In many instances, the incarcerated also received prison plastic surgery; approximately 500,000 people were operated on between 1910 and 1995. By 1990, 44 states and eight federal prisons offered plastic surgery in some form. Many of these surgeries were considered "cosmetic" operations, and involved facelifts, blepharoplasties, chin augmentation, scar removal, and more, the goal being to reduce recidivism, based on psychological theories surrounding lookism. They also offered a way to subvert the "ugly laws" that discriminated against people based on their appearance, which intersected with racism and poverty. These surgeries were supported by the government, and, to begin with, by the public.

Another relevant case of the unethical experimentation on prisoners involves the case of Sloan-Kettering Institute oncologist Doctor Chester Southam, who recruited prisoners during the 1950s and 1960s and injected HeLa cancer cells into them in order to learn about how people's immune systems would react when directly exposed to cancer cells. Some of the results include the growth of cancerous nodules in these individuals. In a study commissioned by the Atomic Energy Commission involving Oregon State Penitentiary prisoners between 1963 and 1971, researchers experimented on prisoners by irradiating their testicles at varying amounts in order to test what effects radiation has on male reproduction. Prisoners were compensated for their participation, but it was discovered that they were not fully informed about the risks of the experiment—such as significant pain, inflammation, and testicular cancer.

== Countries ==
=== Australia ===
There are no national standards for healthcare in Australian prisons. There are eight prison systems in Australia, one for each internal state and territory. Each provides healthcare differently, as prisoners are excluded from Medicare, Australia's otherwise universal healthcare system. The range of services and medications available to people in prison are significantly lower than those available to the general community.

=== Ghana ===
Like other countries, prisoners in Ghana are at high risk for HIV and hepatitis C. The relationship between prisons and the national Ghana Health Service is also weak, leading to disorganized care.

=== United Kingdom ===
Within the last several decades, the number of prisoners in England and Wales has almost doubled. As a result, the prisons are overcrowded and the health of the prisoners is at a higher risk.

Health care in prisons has been commissioned by NHS England since 2013, yet it still remains a work in progress. Before that, it was locally commissioned by primary care trusts. Guidelines produced in 2016 by the National Institute for Health and Care Excellence recommended that on admission there should be a health check with confidential testing for hepatitis B, hepatitis C and HIV. In 2016, there were more than 4,400 prisoners aged 60 or over in England and Wales, and the number was increasingly rapidly. "They are sicker and more likely to have complex health needs than people of an equivalent age who are living in the community".

The House of Commons Health Select Committee produced a report on prison healthcare in November 2018. They found that difficulties in getting prescribed medication had led to prisoners being hospitalised. They had to make an appointment for medication which outside prison was freely available and they could only get one day's supply at a time. Possession of medication could lead to bullying. Transfers from prison to secure beds in psychiatric hospitals in London were taking up to a year in 2019. In the UK women represent just 5% of the prison population, however 65% of them have depression. This is more than the male population at 37%. 23% of all prisoners who self-harm are women. In 2018 the UK Government published standards for the provision of services to improve the health and well-being of women in prison. The guidelines recognize that interventions must take account of gender as well as circumstances while inside prison and when they are released back into the community particularly with regard to their children. The UK Government estimates that 24% - 31% of women prisoners have one or more dependents.

The UK has practiced some privatization for its prison healthcare. For example, Care UK provides healthcare for people in about 30 prisons. LloydsPharmacy won a contract for pharmacy services in the 15 Scottish prisons in May 2019. The contract for £17 million runs until April 2022.

=== United States ===
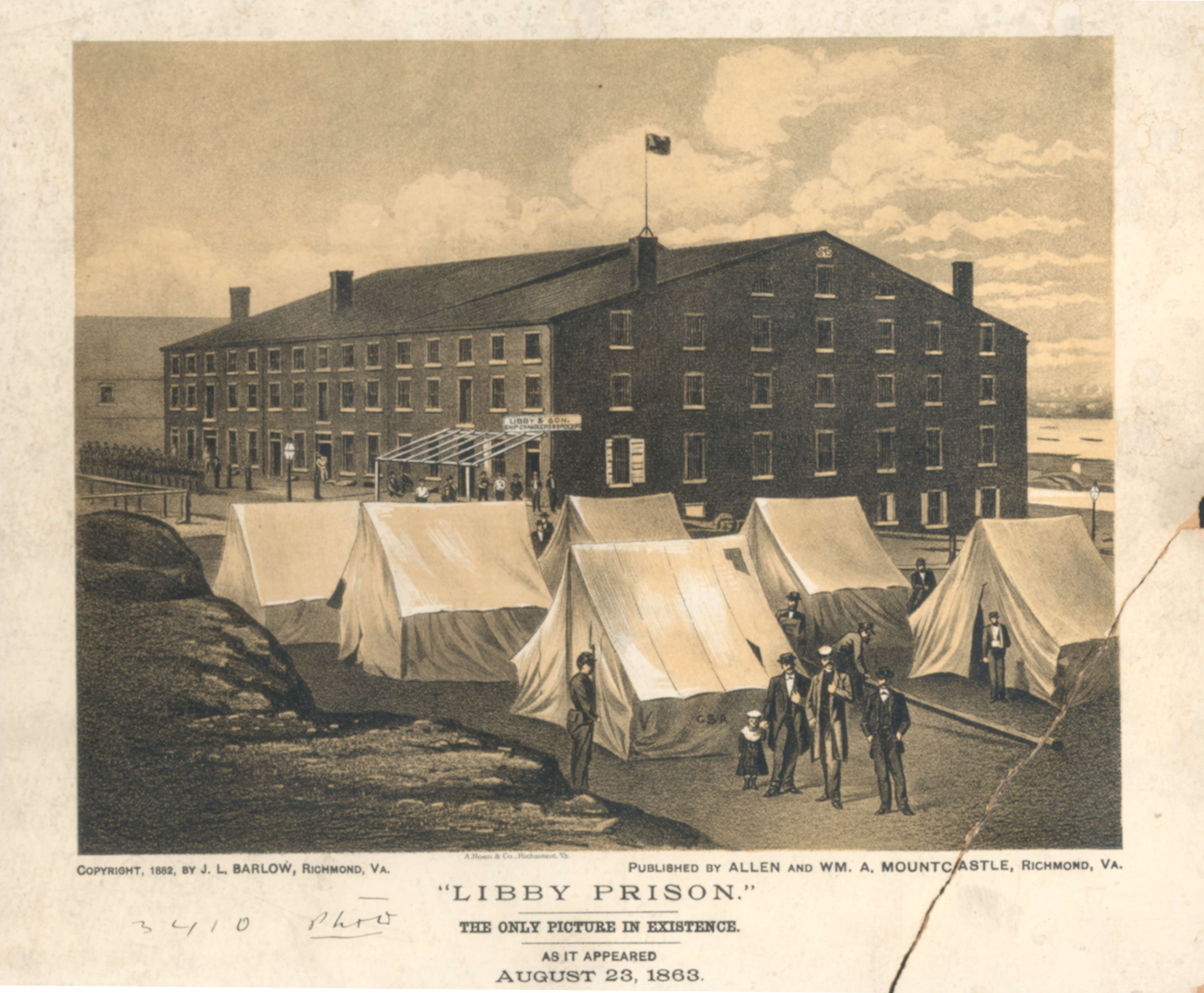
The Confederate Libby Prison, infamous for its overcrowding and poor health conditions

Before the 1960s, prisons determined what healthcare they would provide with little state or federal oversight, due to the US' "hands-off" doctrine. Psychological treatment often included moral-uplift bibliotherapy from prison libraries. Modern US prison healthcare arose after events like the Arkansas prison scandal of 1968 revealed the corruption of the Trusty system and unethical medical research conducted on prisoners. Spates of prison uprisings and campaigns for prisoners' rights pressured the US prison system to change. In the 1970s, widespread intervention by federal courts improved conditions of confinement, including health care services and public health conditions, and stimulated investment in medical staff, equipment, and facilities to improve the quality of prison and jail medical services. Guidelines issued by the American Public Health Association and the creation of the National Commission on Correctional Health Care also improved prisoner healthcare.

With increased care came increased costs. Compared to the UK, the US now uses more partnerships with universities and the private sector to provide healthcare to prison populations. Cutting costs from public health crises, like mental health, AIDS, tuberculosis, and other infectious diseases within American prisons is a primary motivation. These partnerships are supported for the improvements they make to public health and the training opportunities they provide for medical students, although specialized medical training in prison settings is rare. The outsourcing of prison healthcare has led to controversies with companies like Corizon or Prison Health Services providing substandard or negligent care to prisoners.

Prison is often the first place that people in the USA are able to receive medical treatment that they couldn't afford outside. Inmates often receive more medical treatment in prison than they do in the outside world, largely because many ex-prisoners lose federal benefits such as Medicaid after incarceration. However, upon release, inmates do not continue to receive the treatment they need and oftentimes their condition reverts to pre-incarceration level severity. Although US prisoners are entitled to medical care and receive more treatment than they do in the outside world, the marginal nature of prison healthcare and US mass incarceration means that many prisoners also go untreated . Following the mass closure of mental health hospitals in the 1960s, Mental health services in US prisons often aren't available for criminals; most prisoners have an untreated mental disorder and psychiatric care or treatment is expensive for the mentally ill. 64 percent of jail inmates, 54 percent of state prisoners, and 45 percent of federal prisoners in the US report having mental health concerns. Health care in American women's prisons often does not meet the needs of women prisoners, such as in the areas of pregnancy and prenatal care, menstrual hygiene and gynecological services, and mental health, especially associated with past trauma or sexual abuse. Despite offering quality medical assistance to certain prisoners with specific illnesses, prison clinics do not meet the needs of all and often presume the continuation of the US prison–industrial complex.

The Society of Correctional Physicians is a non-profit physician organization founded in August, 1992 as national educational and scientific society for the advancement of correctional medicine, and became the American College of Correctional Physicians in 2015.

== See also ==
- Correctional nursing
- Experimentation on prisoners
- Forensic nursing
- Healthcare for LGBT prison patients
- Incarceration and health
- Menopause in incarceration
- Mental health among female offenders in the United States
- Mental health court
- Mentally ill people in United States jails and prisons
- Prison plastic surgery
- Prisoner suicide
