= Prisoner suicide =

Suicide by an inmate in a jail or prison

Suicide is and continues to be a leading cause of death in jails and in prisons worldwide, and suicide rates are typically more than 10 times higher in the female incarcerated population and twice as high in the male incarcerated population relative to the age-standardised general population in a given country.

== Risk factors ==
Individual and environmental risk factors exist, and include clinical factors, housing, and social connection.

=== Individual factors ===
- Pre-existing mental disorders: mood, anxiety, psychotic, and substance use disorders are particularly strong risk factors. Comorbidity (having multiple disorders) further increases risk.
- History of self-harm or suicide attempts: prisoners with a prior history of self-harm are up to seven times more likely to engage in suicidal behaviour while incarcerated.
- Suicidal ideation: both current and previous suicidal thoughts are among the strongest predictors of suicide and self-harm in prison.
- Trauma and childhood abuse: Histories of trauma, including childhood maltreatment, are robust risk markers.
- Impulsivity and aggression: traits such as poor behavioural control, often seen in violent offenders, are linked to higher suicide risk.
- Socioeconomic disadvantage: social disadvantage and marginalization are overrepresented in prison populations and contribute to vulnerability.
- Gender: while both men and women who are incarcerated are at elevated risk compared to their counterparts in the general population, women may have a slightly higher prevalence of suicide attempts, though findings are mixed.

=== Prison environment factors ===
- Solitary confinement and single-cell occupancy: isolation, whether through solitary confinement or being housed alone, is strongly associated with increased suicide risk.
- Lack of social support: absence of social visits or poor support networks within prison increases risk.
- Victimization and bullying: experiencing physical or sexual victimization while incarcerated is a significant risk factor.
- Remand status: prisoners awaiting trial (remand) are at higher risk than those already sentenced.
- Type of offense: those incarcerated for violent offenses, especially homicide or sexual offenses, have higher suicide risk.
- Loss of autonomy and purpose: The restrictive, monotonous, and often overcrowded environment of corrections contributes to psychological distress and risk.
- Disciplinary infractions: involvement in disciplinary incidents within a facility is associated with increased risk of self-harm and suicide attempts.
- Duration and stage of incarceration: Risk may be heightened during certain periods, such as early incarceration or after disciplinary actions, but this varies by context.

Prisoners who have recently received bad news from home or are demonstrating an inability to adapt to the institutional environment may also be at higher risk.

Prisoners with illnesses are at higher risk of suicide. Prisoners with AIDS have a suicide rate between 16 and 36 times higher than that of the general population.

== Incidence ==
Suicides in prison compared to the general population (Council of Europe members, average 2011–15) Suicide rate in the general population, per 100,000 people per year Suicide rate in prison, per 100,000 inmates per year

In some European countries such as France, Belgium and Norway, the suicide rate among prisoners is ten times as high as among the general population, but it is unknown whether this is because of the prison environment or because persons with marked suicidal tendencies are more liable to be imprisoned for crime. The apparent motivations for prison suicide are most commonly fear of other inmates, of the consequences of one's crime, or imprisonment, and the loss of a significant relationship. Suicides occur most commonly in isolation cells. The most common time for suicides to occur is in the early morning hours. Suicidal inmates are sometimes put on suicide watch and/or placed in special cells with no furniture or objects with which they could harm themselves.

A study in New York found that 41% of prison suicides involved inmates who had recently received mental health services, although only one-third of prison suicides are found to have a psychiatric history, as opposed to 80–90 percent of suicides in the general community. Pretrial detainees tend to have higher rates of suicide than other inmates, with about a third of all prison suicides occurring within the first week of custody. Custodial suicide is the leading cause of death among detainees housed in jails.

According to data by the Council of Europe, in the Balkans the suicide rate in prisons is lower than in the rest of Europe: between 2011 and 2015 there were on average 53 cases of suicide each year for every 100,000 prisoners in the Balkans, and 87 in the rest of Europe. This may be explained by the fact that in Balkan countries the incarceration rate is relatively high – so the prisons are not populated by people that are particularly vulnerable – and the use of preventive detention is rather low.

The World Health Organization (WHO) has criticised the fact that the rate of suicide in Norwegian prisons is one of the highest in Europe.

== Liability ==
In the United States, liability can arise under 42 U.S.C. § 1983 and the Eighth Amendment to the United States Constitution if jail and prison officials demonstrate deliberate indifference toward a prisoner's suicidal tendencies, as suicidal inmates are regarded as being in need of medical care. In Farmer v. Brennan, deliberate indifference was established as a standard between negligence and acting with purpose or intent, thus amounting basically to recklessness. The Farmer decision has created difficulties for plaintiffs in proving suicide liability as a violation of constitutionally established civil rights. The burden of proof appears to be higher than in malpractice cases. Case law provides that liability only exists if prison officials had subjective knowledge of (or at least willful blindness to) an inmate's serious medical need. I.e., they cannot be held liable if they merely should have known, but did not actually know.

Mere negligence is not enough for there to be a constitutional violation. The federal courts seldom allow recovery based on section 1983 absent extreme instances of deliberate indifference to a suicidal prisoner or a clear pattern of general indifference to suicidal inmates. There has to have been a strong likelihood rather than a mere possibility that a suicide would occur. Courts have also found that there is no duty to screen every prisoner for suicide potential, unless it is obvious that an inmate has such tendencies or propensities. Further, even if prison officials are aware of the inmate's suicidal tendencies and he does commit suicide, they are not liable if they took reasonable actions to prevent the suicide. In determining deliberate indifference, the practical limitations on jailers in preventing inmate suicides must be taken into account.

Examples of failures that can give rise to claims related to suicide in correctional settings include inadequate mental health and psychiatric examination, failure to consider obvious and substantial risk factors in assessing potential for suicide, failure to place an inmate on suicide precautions upon recognizing the obvious and substantial risk, failure to communicate the action taken to other providers or to custody and jail staff, failure to adequately monitor an inmate on suicide watch and maintain an appropriate observation log, discontinuation of suicide watch despite prior knowledge of suicidal behavior of the inmate and potential continued risk, failure to follow policies and procedures related to suicide risk assessment, intervention, and prevention, failure to provide training to correctional staff, abrupt discontinuation of psychotropics in an inmate who is known to have made a serious suicide attempt in the recent past, and grossly inadequate treatment by professional standards or the lack of treatment plans, policies, procedures, or staff, creating a grossly inadequate mental health care system, and repeated examples of delayed or denied medical treatment.

One criticism of the current case law is that prison officials are incentivized to avoid screening inmates for suicidal tendencies, because if the screening is ineffective, or the jail fails to deter the suicidal attempt of a prisoner it knows is suicidal, the governmental entity and the jailer may be at greater risk of being held liable than if they had conducted no screening. Nonetheless, some jails screen anyway, since jail suicides are difficult on staff and on the municipality and often lead to legal action, and because some states mandate screening procedures and impose tort liability for failure to follow them. Elected officials may face political ramifications if they become the scapegoat for a prisoner suicide.

Another factor that has led to more screening of inmates for suicide is that research has shown that suicide tends to be the result of a plan rather than impulsive, which makes the suicide potentially more foreseeable if proper screening is done.

== See also ==
- Anti-ligature fixture
- Assessment of suicide risk
- Correlates of crime
- Death in custody
- Enforced disappearance
- Death row phenomenon
- Jeffrey Epstein
- Estelle v. Gamble
- Fred West
- Guantanamo Bay detention camp suicide attempts
- Harold Shipman
- Incarceration and health
- Stephen Kovacs
- List of prison deaths
- Philip Markoff
- Mental health court
- Mentally ill people in United States jails and prisons
- Prison abolition movement
- Prison healthcare
- Prison reform
- Prisoner abuse
- Prisoners' rights
- Psychiatric hospital
- Solitary confinement
- Suicidal person
- Suicide by cop
