= Untruth (disambiguation) =

An untruth is a lie or any false statement.

Untruth may also refer to:

- Untruth: The Psychology of Trumpism (2024), film directed by Dan Partland and featuring Brittany Friedman
- "Untruth" (2021), television episode from Undercover, South Korean political thriller
- Untruth: Why the Conventional Wisdom Is (Almost Always) Wrong (2001), book by Robert J. Samuelson, American conservative journalist
- "Untruth" (2023), fictional abilities in Undead Unluck, Japanese manga
- "Untruth" (2007), chapter from Enchanter, Japanese manga written and illustrated by Izumi Kawachi
- "Untruth" (2024), single by Ov Sulfur, American deathcore band
- "Fu-ji-tsu" ("Untruth", 1988), song from Shizuka by Shizuka Kudo, Japanese singer, actress and former idol
