= Prison plastic surgery =

Plastic surgery provided to prison inmates for social rehabilitation

Prison plastic surgery is plastic surgery or cosmetic surgery (often the terms are used interchangeably) offered and performed on people who are incarcerated, as a means of social rehabilitation. These services were normally provided as part of a larger package of care that may include work training, psychological services, and more. Popular surgeries included rhinoplasties, blepharoplasty, facelifts, scar removal and tattoo removal. These programs began in the early 20th century and were commonplace up till the early 1990s. They took place across the US (in 42+ states), the UK, Canada, and Mexico.

"Incarceration itself is famously hard on the body," reports journalist and author Zara Stone in her book, Killer Looks: The Forgotten History of Plastic Surgery In Prisons; in 2017, facial injuries accounted for 33% of all inmate hospitalizations in New York City, compared to 0.7 percent of the general population. "The existence of prison plastic surgery programs is America’s dirty little secret."

In San Quentin prison, California, the prison's chief medical doctor Dr. Leo L. Stanley was one of the first people to develop a prison plastic surgery practice, focused on reforming the faces of convicts. "Considerable plastic surgery has been done, particularly that done for deformed noses,” Dr. Leo Stanley wrote in his 1918 report to the warden. “This work has been of benefit in that it has improved the appearance of many of the men and removed a deforming feature. Some work has been done on ears which were very prominent." Stanley reported long waiting lists, noted researcher Ethan Blue. Dr. Stanley's "typical prison malingerer," had a fractured nose or scarred face, and was treated with crude methods: for nose surgery, a six-inch length of broomstick was placed against the nose and hit with a mallet. "The physician of the future will be an increasing powerful antagonist in the war against crime," Stanley wrote.

New York was an early adopter, with attention to prisoner beautification baked in from the early 1900s. In 1915, NYC police commissioner Arthur Woods referred to a 15-year-old inmate's appearance in relation to his crime. “He was an inferior looking lad, small and flabby...mild acne on the face...forehead broad, nose small, eyes rather sly…chin pointed and receding,” wrote Woods.

Prison plastic surgery became more prevalent throughout the 20th century. In 1954 the American Correctional Association added prisoner plastic surgery to its manual, stating: “elective surgery…[for] especially repulsive facial disfigurements has a definite place in the rehabilitation of prisoners.” Many states followed suit, including Texas, North Carolina, and Hawaii.

Some of these early surgeries fell in the eugenics bracket, the idea that criminality could be seen and displayed on the face, reports social Psychologist Ray Bull and Nichola Rumsey. An examination of some of the mid-20th century prison programs suggested that by and large, plastic surgeries did reduce recidivism—in some cases, dropping it from 76% to 33%. Some findings: Plastic surgery is effective in enhancing the outcome for non-addict prisoners. In 1970, the former director of the Federal Bureau of Prisons from 1937 to 1964, James Van Benschoten Bennett, analyzed these programs. "One of the more fruitful areas of research now under way in the federal prisons concerns plastic surgery: the way to rehabilitate a misshapen prisoner."

"Discriminatory practices based on physical appearance perpetuate social inequalities and hinder individuals' opportunities for reintegration into society," noted author Zara Stone, in a Rockefeller research paper.

== Ethical considerations ==
The scholar and feminist critic Jessica Mitford was one of the first to question the ethics of performing plastic surgery on prisoners, and if in such a circumstance the prisoners could really consent to such treatment. In her book, Kind and Usual Punishment, she wrote that one doctor told her that inmates had become “our companions in medical science.. . . . This has been a rewarding experience both for the physician and for the subjects.” This was in regards to a scurvy experiment where inmates suffered hemorrhages in the skin and whites of the eyes, excessive loss of hair, mental depressions, and abnormal emotional responses... at a time when scurvy was already curable and treatable."

The writer Allen M. Hornblum explored the issue of consent in his book, Acres Of Skin, where he reported of strips of skin being flayed off the back of inmates that participated in dermatological trials in the Eastern Penitentiary, Pennsylvania. Ostensibly, they were volunteers, but a payment incentive was the reason for their volunteerism and abuse.

== In popular culture ==
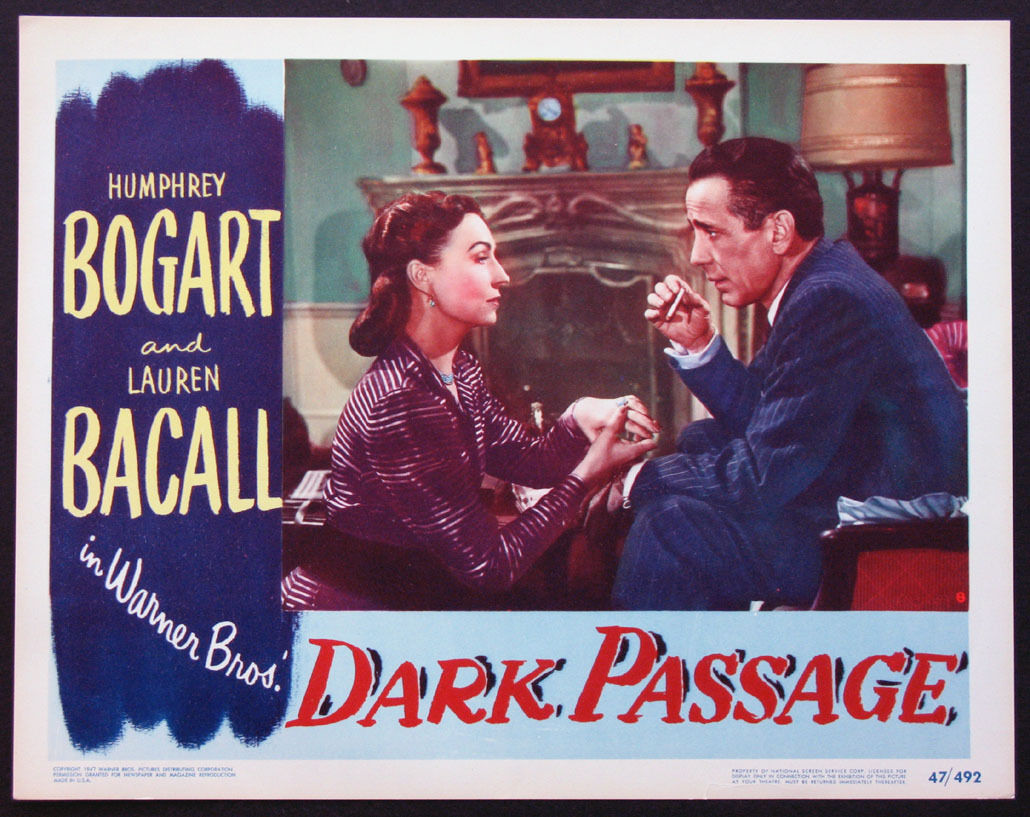
Dark Passage 1947 Lobby Card 1

In the movie Dark Passage, Humphrey Bogart plays the role of Vincent Parry, a man sentenced for murder. Parry escapes San Quentin and undergoes plastic surgery to change his appearance and hide from the law while he tries to clear his name. In the 1996 movie A Face to Die For, Yasmine Bleeth plays the part of a scarred young woman that is conned into participating in a crime. In prison she gets plastic surgery as part of a reform program, and when released sets out to seek her revenge.

== See also ==
- Allophilia
- Passing (racial identity)
- Skin whitening
- Transracial (identity)
- Prison reform
- Prison healthcare – Medical treatment in penal institutions
