= ACCP =

ACCP may refer to:

- American College of Clinical Pharmacy, a pharmacy organization for the promotion of clinical pharmacy
- American College of Correctional Physicians, a medical organization consisting of physicians and non-physician practitioners in the field of correctional (i.e. prisons and jails) medicine
- American College of Chest Physicians
- American Council for Cultural Policy, a group of antiquities dealers, collectors and lawyers who promote broader cultural exchange by influencing policy in the US
- In mathematics, ascending chain condition on principal ideals
- American College of Clinical Pharmacology, a professional organization promoting leadership and education among Clinical Pharmacology healthcare professionals
- The U.S. Army's Army Correspondence Course Program
