= Anti-ligature fixture =

Component designed to reduce opportunities for self-harm or suicide

An anti-ligature fixture or fitting (or ligature resistant fitting) is an element of architecture or furnishing that is designed to prevent or hinder the attaching of ligatures. They are used in environments such as prisons and secure healthcare settings where there is a risk of suicide or self-harm.

== Design principles ==
Attachment of ligatures can be hindered by eliminating hooked shapes railings, and similar design elements, as well as by making potential attachment points weak enough to break away if weighted. Experiments have been attempted with using weight sensors to trigger an alarm if unusual behavior is detected, but these have not been found to be effective.

In contexts where care is being provided for children or adolescents, a potential consideration in anti-ligature design is whether the designs will cause harm due to creating an institutionalize, non-homelike living environment.

== Applications ==
In England, the NHS mandates that all fixtures in adult acute mental health facilities be anti-ligature

== Results ==
A literature review from Cardiff University found that removal of ligature points in the environment helped prevent suicide in hospital settings.

== See also ==
- Assessment of suicide risk
- Death in custody
- Detention (confinement)
- Incarceration and health
- Mental health law
- Suicide by hanging
- Suicide watch
