= Pay-to-stay =

Practice of charging prisoners money for their involuntary stay

In the United States, pay-to-stay is the practice of charging prisoners for their accommodation in jails. The practice is controversial and can result in large debts being accumulated by prisoners who are then unable to repay the debt following their release, preventing them from successfully reintegrating in society once released. In 2015, the American Civil Liberties Union of Ohio published a comprehensive study of the pay-to-stay policy throughout the state, the first detailed study of its kind.

As of 2021, prisons in about 40 states have pay-to-stay programs with fees and implementation often varying by county.

== History ==
In modern times pay-to-stay programs have been noted for their low debt collection rate that often range between 10 and 15 percent due to people being in pay-to-stay being much more likely to suffer from poverty; over a two fiscal year period, Eaton County, Michigan collected only around 5% of over $1 million charged in pay-to-stay fees.

In 2017, The Marshall Project published a study of jails in Southern California, where wealthier prisoners could pay to be housed in a more comfortable, safer prison in a different jurisdiction, sometimes with more furlough privileges. The facilities are located in Seal Beach, Anaheim, Arcadia, Burbank, Glendale, Huntington Beach, Pasadena, Santa Ana and Torrance. These prisons offer many benefits, including private cells, less violence and even the opportunity for convicts to serve their sentence only on weekends or after work.

In a 2022 interview with NPR, Lisa Foster, leader of the anti-pay-to-stay advocacy group Fines and Fees Justice Center, stated that pay-to-stay programs in the United States became popular in the 1980s, following large increases in incarceration in the United States and law enforcement agencies attempting to increase revenues after federal spending cuts in local law enforcement programs.

In 2024 the Captive Money Lab launched a comprehensive study of the practice on a national scale. Previously, the lab co-founders Drs. April D. Fernandes, Gabriela Kirk, and Brittany Friedman penned a piece for The Washington Post tracing the rise of pay-to-stay to the financialization of the criminal legal system, urging lawmakers to reform the practice.

== See also ==
- Debtor's prison
