= Bangkok Rules =

UN measure for the treatment of women prisoners

The Bangkok Rules (Thai: ข้อกำหนดกรุงเทพ), or formally the "United Nations Rules for the Treatment of Women Prisoners and Non-custodial Measures for Women Offenders", is a set of 70 rules focused on the treatment of female offenders and prisoners adopted by the United Nations General Assembly on 22 December 2010. The Bangkok Rules, or the "70 Rules" as they are frequently known, is the first set of rules tailored to the treatment of women prisoners. It supplements existing international standards on the treatment of prisoners, particularly the Standard Minimum Rules for the Treatment of Prisoners, which applies to all prisoners regardless of gender.

== Introduction ==
In 2009, the Thai government, prodded by Princess Bajrakitiyabha, an advocate for female prison reform, submitted a resolution to the Commission on Crime Prevention and Criminal Justice, a subsidiary body of the UN Economic and Social Council, that detailed the vulnerability of women incarcerated in a system built principally for men. The resolution set in motion a series of meetings that culminated in the UN General Assembly's 2010 adoption of the body's first set of rules focused on women prisoners: Rules for the Treatment of Women Prisoners and Non-custodial Measures for Women Offenders, or the Bangkok Rules.

On 22 December 2010, the United Nations General Assembly passed a resolution to adopt the Bangkok Rules, which encouraged member states "to adopt legislation to establish alternatives to imprisonment and to give priority to the financing of such systems, as well as to the development of the mechanisms needed for their implementation."

== Growing female prison population ==
Estimated to account for between two and ten percent of national prison populations, women are the fastest growing prisoner demographic. In the US, for example, the number of incarcerated women has grown at roughly twice the rate for men, multiplying by almost a factor of seven in the last three decades. Chinese data are not up to date, but, between 1997 and 2002, the number of women in Chinese prisons increased at an average annual rate of 13 percent.

== Victims of domestic abuse and alternatives to prison ==
Female offenders are disproportionately likely to have been victims of domestic or sexual abuse. Throughout the criminal justice process, they are at risk of further abuse, violence and humiliation—from police, prison officers and fellow prisoners. For many women, custody means ill-treatment, threats of rape, touching, "virginity testing", being stripped naked, invasive body searches, insults and humiliations of a sexual nature or even rape. There are also cases of women prisoners being forced into a position of providing sex for favours or preferential treatment. Alternatives to imprisonment—such as community service—have been shown to be much more effective in reducing recidivism and promoting lasting rehabilitation. However, in many countries alternatives to prison fail to take into account the specific requirements of women offenders. Their caretaking responsibilities and their previous history of domestic violence are often overlooked, as are gender differences in drug dependency and therefore drug treatment.

== See also ==
- Prison Healthcare
- Menopause in incarceration
- Incarceration of women
