= Compassionate release =

Process for early release of prisoners

Compassionate release is a process by which inmates in criminal justice systems may be eligible for immediate early release on grounds of "particularly extraordinary or compelling circumstances which could not reasonably have been foreseen by the court at the time of sentencing". Compassionate release procedures, which are also known as medical release, medical parole, medical furlough, and humanitarian parole, can be mandated by the courts or by internal corrections authorities. Unlike regular parole, compassionate release is not based on a prisoner's behaviour or sentencing, but rather on medical or humanitarian changes in the prisoner's situation.

== Request process ==
Obtaining a compassionate release for a prison inmate is a process that varies from country to country (and sometimes even within countries) but generally involves petitioning the warden or court to the effect that the subject is terminally ill and would benefit from obtaining aid outside of the prison system, or is otherwise eligible under the relevant law.

Compassionate release is most often granted to inmates with terminal illnesses that cause life expectancies of less than six or eighteen months, depending on the jurisdiction. Other allowable causes for compassionate release may be medical but non-terminal, such as incurable debilitating mental or physical conditions that prevent inmate self-care or a combination of advanced age and irreversible age-related conditions that prevent functioning in a prison setting. Prisoners with illnesses such as Alzheimer's disease would be considered eligible for release.

Grounds for compassionate release may also be familial, although not all jurisdictions offer this option. Under the United States' federal law, for example, inmates may be released to care for a minor child or debilitated spouse in the absence of other family caregivers. This is intended to be after the death or debilitation of the child's primary caregiver in the former case or the finding of permanent mental or physical disability of the spouse in the latter. While there are clear advantages to the individual in this type of release, there are many procedural obstacles to this type of petition which lead to it rarely being granted.

== Arguments ==
=== Support ===
Arguments for the expansion of compassionate release programs generally address the benefit to terminally ill prisoners as well as cost savings to the state. Terminal illness which requires special care or treatment is a major concern for prison inmates who may be unable to access the same type or quality of care in prison as they would outside of an institutional setting. These illnesses can further shorten the lifespan of the individual while he or she is in prison, a setting that already has poorer health outcomes and a lower life expectancy than the general population. The Bureau of Prisons estimates that the United States would save $5.8 million per year by releasing 100 people on compassionate release per year, and overcrowding would be lessened. Those who are approved for compassionate release have a lower tendency to recommit crime, which is attributed to those being released being in extremely poor health, and possibly due to the careful screening process inmates go through for risk of recidivism before approval for compassionate release can be granted.

=== Criticism ===
Compassionate release relies on good faith, requiring that the released inmates do not continue committing crimes after they have been released; while many of these criminals are in very poor health, some are not incapacitated, and their reintroduction into society puts them back into a setting where they would be free to commit crimes. A questionnaire study by Jennifer Boothby and Lorraine Overduin on attitudes towards compassionate release suggested that undergraduate students have a negative attitude towards the compassionate release of prisoners, based on responses from 163 undergraduate students in an introductory psychology course. This suggests that negative attitudes toward compassionately released prisoners, and attitudes towards prisoners themselves, could be an obstacle to those seeking an expansion of this type of resentencing and that there is a negative attitude in midwestern university undergraduates over mingling with those convicted of crimes meriting time potentially up to life sentences. Another argument against compassionate release is fairness and concern over justice for time served; for those that were placed in prison justifiably, the question arises of how long they should be forced to serve for their crimes before they are allowed renewed access to their community for health and support, and state and federal laws generally stipulate guidelines that address minimum proportions of sentences that must be served before eligibility for compassionate release.

The process of obtaining compassionate release on medical grounds has been criticized in multiple states for being highly subjective on a case-by-case basis, relying heavily on specific doctors' opinions and for not having sufficiently clear-cut guidelines as to what defines a patient as being eligible for compassionate release. This often results in calls for reform, fueled by statistics regarding the rate of compassionate release and the illnesses of the patients who do not receive it.

== Implementation ==
A major roadblock to the implementation of compassionate release is its reliance on medical trials. Due to the fact that the criteria for medically based petitions for compassionate release are, by necessity, dependent on medicine and doctors, individual medical professionals have an inordinate amount of power in determining each compassionate release case. Because of the high degree of variation among individual medical professionals, the high variation that is translated into each decision is a major issue in many of the current compassionate release systems. The inconsistency of current systems of compassionate release is a common flaw that hinders increased use of compassionate release.

== Other options ==
For prisoners suffering from terminal illnesses, alternative options include programs that distribute health materials and segregation of affected individuals and expanded hospice programs. Hospice programs within the prisons have been used, although this does not address the humanitarian aspect of allowing inmates to die with dignity among family and friends, and the issue of cost to the state is still prevalent. Specialized medical care in a prison setting is difficult to achieve and is a costly proposition. With the prison population aging and in poorer health than the general population, as previously mentioned, cost may become a prohibitive factor, increasing the attraction of compassionate release where possible.

For non-medical cases such as care for a family member in the absence of other available parties, practical alternatives are difficult to identify. A minor child or disabled spouse for whom no other caregiver is available is likely to end up as a ward of the courts or in institutional care if the compassionate release request is not granted.

As of 2009, corrections systems with compassionate release procedures included the United States Federal Bureau of Prisons (often known as the BOP), Scotland, England and Wales, China, France, New Zealand and 36 of the 50 U.S. state prison systems.

== Legislation on compassionate release by country ==
=== New Zealand ===
New Zealand legislation includes a provision for prisoners to apply for compassionate release from prison. Section 41 of the Parole Act 2002 provides that the Parole Board may, on referral by the chairperson, direct that an offender be released on compassionate release on either of the following grounds: (a) the offender has given birth to a child or (b) the offender is seriously ill and is unlikely to recover. The Department of Corrections is not responsible for decisions regarding compassionate release of prisoners. When a prisoner is seriously ill and unlikely to recover, an application will be made to the New Zealand Parole Board where an independent decision will be made. All prisoners in New Zealand are eligible for compassionate release. The length of a sentence or eligibility for parole are not factors that will affect the prisoner's ability to apply for compassionate release.

In November 2016, a high-profile prisoner, Vicki Ravana Letele was granted compassionate release from prison. Letele was sentenced to three years and two months for ten charges of dishonestly using a document. The application for compassionate release was based on Letele's diagnosis of metastatic cancer. Her illness was terminal with a life expectancy of 6 months. The chairman of the Parole Board, Hon J W Gendall initially declined Letele's release on compassionate grounds, citing: "It is quite often the case that prisoners contract or are diagnosed with serious illness but if they can be adequately treated and managed in prison and death is not imminent that compassionate release is not appropriate. It is not the case that family and others may reasonably believe that the prisoner should be in the care of his/her family at such difficult times."

The serving prime minister of New Zealand in 2016, Sir John Key, voiced his opinion on the Letele case following widespread public outcry and protest. Key stated: "I would have thought we were a pretty compassionate country. We do need to take on board the criminal activity that the person's undertaken but I don't think we want to see people dying in prison if, on compassionate grounds, it's reasonable they be returned home." Initial conflicting views between the Ministry of Justice and the Parole Board were resolved on 10 November 2016, when the Parole Board under Section 41 of the Parole Act 2002 ordered the compassionate release of Letele. The decision factored in that there was no offending history, the prison security classification was low and Letele was seriously ill and unlikely to recover.

Between the years of 2015 and 2016, seven prisoners were released on compassionate grounds, all cases determined on the basis that they were seriously ill and unlikely to recover. Figures from the years 2006 – 2013 revealed a total of twenty-five applications, with three of those declined. The application process for compassionate release can be difficult to achieve on time, which is one of the reasons that very few applications are received. Other reasons include the likelihood of a prisoner dying in prison before an application is approved, and an absence of reasonable and available support from family if a prisoner is released from prison. Furthermore, long-stay prisoners may not wish to be released; the prison may be regarded as home and fellow inmates as family.

Human rights approach

In practice, the Parole Board only releases prisoners on compassionate release if they are seriously ill and unlikely to recover. However, the Act also provides for compassionate release of a prisoner when they have given birth to a child. Prison management first assesses the prisoner's suitability, taking into account security classification, the welfare of the prisoner and the child, and the views of the Ministry for Vulnerable Children Oranga Tamariki (formerly Child Youth and Family). A report is then submitted to the Parole Board. However, the establishment of mother and baby units in prisons has made this provision practically void. The reason as for why it has not been removed from the Act is that it would violate New Zealand's International Human Rights obligations and be in contravention of Section 19 of the Bill of Rights Act; Freedom from Discrimination, if it were not available. Comparatively, compassionate release is based on underlying principles of human dignity. Dignity in this sense refers to the right of a human being to have inherent equal and inalienable rights to achieve social progress and better standards of living. Preventing the release of seriously ill prisoners would undeniably violate their human dignity.

The 2004 review of Human Rights in New Zealand stated that the vulnerability of people in detention was one of New Zealand's most pressing human rights issues. The United Nations Convention on the Rights of the Child (UNCROC) and the Convention on the Elimination of All Forms of Discrimination Against Women (CEDAW) is the relevant conventions concerning compassionate release. In practice, the Department of Corrections supports a child's contact with parents who are in prison when it is in the best interests of the child. Prisoners are encouraged to have positive relationships with their children so they can better reintegrate on release. These principles uphold New Zealand's obligations under Article 9 of UNCROC: Separation from Parents, and includes several programs including 'Mothers with Babies Units', 'Mothers and Bonding Facilities' and importantly, 'Prison Activities Centres' that teach fathers parenting skills.

Similarly, under New Zealand's obligations in Article 12 of CEDAW improvements were made in women's correctional facilities to include 'Mothers with Babies Units' allowing mothers to keep their children with them in prison up until the age of two, where it was previously 9 months. The aim of this is to achieve a reduction in re-offending for women and increase their children's life chances. Compassionate release must be available to prisoners following the birth of a child to meet the obligations that are specified in these conventions. In practice, the incorporation of units that enable a relationship between a mother and child in prison is consistent with the obligations that New Zealand has in the context of international human rights. This explains the apparent non-existence of compassionate release on the ground that a prisoner has given birth.

=== United Kingdom ===
==== England and Wales ====
Applications for early release on compassionate grounds are allowed in England and Wales for prisoners serving determinate or indeterminate sentences. Three general principles are applied during the decision-making process: the safety of the public, new information not available to the court, and whether there was a specific purpose for the early release.

Prisoners serving determinate sentences are also eligible for compassionate release based on tragic family circumstances. Prisoners serving indeterminate sentences are excluded from this provision and are subject to further restricting criteria in an application for compassionate release based on terminal illness. They will be assessed on the risk of re-offending, particularly of a sexual or violent nature, whether further imprisonment would reduce their life expectancy, whether adequate arrangements are available outside prison, and whether early release will provide some significant benefit to their family. Where conditions are self-induced, such as a hunger strike or refusal of treatment, an application may be declined.

===== The aging prison population =====
The rates of death from natural causes in prison doubled from 2008 to 2017, with 199 occurring in the year to March 2017. The age of the prison population is rising due to a shift in major sentencing trends; prison terms are increasingly longer for the older population. The Prison Reform Trust called for a review of the current compassionate release process, commenting on the difficulty that a medical professional will have diagnosing a three-month life expectancy. The Trust recommended that a one-year life expectancy be sufficient for an application for compassionate release from prison. The former Deputy Director of the Trust observed that older prisoners who are terminally ill are unlikely to pose a risk to the public. He believed that a range of options should be considered, including compassionate release to ensure that people spend their last days with dignity.

High-profile cases such as the release of Reggie Kray in 2000 and Ronnie Biggs in 2009 raised issues regarding the term "compassionate release". The idea that compassion should be exercised with prisoners was a concept that did not reconcile with popular societal views. Costs associated with medical care for the elderly and terminally ill was noted, with acceptance of the costs that are incurred by sending prison guards to hospital and providing palliative care within the prison environment. However, early release is largely deemed to be socially incompatible.

===== Human rights of older persons =====
Compassionate release is founded on a humanitarian concern for the dying, and practical reasons such as high costs or the inability to care adequately for such persons in prison. Prison is generally deemed unsuitable for compassionate end-of-life care due to its punitive purpose. End-of-life care exists in prisons in England and Wales, but the adequacy of the care has been challenged, as the opposing goals of security and compassionate care are said to be mutually exclusive. In May 2016, the Council of Europe European Committee on Crime Problems issued a white paper on prison overcrowding. The paper addressed the root causes of prison overcrowding and supports the wide application for early release for seriously ill and aged prisoners on compassionate grounds.

A 2011 report to the UN Secretary-General highlighted the difficulties with the aging population, particularly regarding the long-term care of the elderly. This is made worse by the lack of legal framework to monitor human rights violations in long-term care facilities. Dying and suffering are not part of a prisoner's punishment. Human rights recommendations for aging prisoners advocate that necessary changes should be made to adapt to the older prisoner's physical and mental health. If changes cannot be adequately implemented, then compassionate release of the prisoner should be considered in order not to violate Article 3 (on inhumane and degrading treatment) of the European Convention on Human Rights.

==== Scotland ====
The Scottish legal system permits compassionate release for terminal illnesses. There are only a few applications per year, and most are granted. A prominent case was that of Abdelbaset al-Megrahi, released on 20 August 2009 because of prostate cancer.

=== United States ===
In the United States, forms of compassionate release are found both federally and in the laws of thirty-nine states. With the rapid increase in prison populations following the introduction of mandatory minimum sentencing laws in the 1990s, many people have called for the expanded use of compassionate release as a "safety valve" to relieve overcrowded prison systems and reduce pressure on government budgets as well as to ease the suffering of inmates and their families. Some states have recently expanded their forms of compassionate release, as can be seen in New York's changes to its medical parole laws to include both the terminally ill and chronically ill inmates in the absence of a prognosis of imminent death, although this has not necessarily resulted in more releases.

Many who are eligible for compassionate release on grounds of terminal illness and who have applications pending die in prison before their cases are processed due to case backlogs and narrow interpretation of the law. The issue of where and how to best deliver end-of-life care has been compounded by the sheer number of prisoners now incarcerated in the United States, as well as by the aging of the prison population.

Federal laws governing compassionate release include 18 U.S.C. § 3582(c)(1)(A), which came into effect on 1 November 1987 and governs those whose offences occurred since it was enacted, and 18 U.S.C. § 4205(g), the previous version, which still controls the release of inmates who were convicted of offences that occurred on or before that date. States that offer compassionate release each have their laws governing eligibility, and it may differ from the federal versions both in the requirements for eligibility and in the type of release that can be granted, for example, medical parole rather than resentencing.

To seek compassionate release, federal inmates must file a petition with the warden. Compassionate release is only granted "when there are particularly extraordinary or compelling circumstances which could not reasonably have been foreseen by the court at the time of sentencing".

==== Variation among states ====
Different states have various policies on the compassionate release system, varying on details such as the life expectancy required to warrant compassionate release.

==== U.S. cases ====
In 2013, Herman Wallace was released from Angola Prison to spend the rest of his remaining life in a personal care home. A few days later, he died.

Lynne Stewart, a criminal defence attorney was convicted of passing messages from imprisoned terrorist Omar Abdel-Rahman (the "Blind Sheikh") to his followers in al-Jama'a al-Islamiyya. Judge John Koeltl sentenced Stewart to ten years in prison, but on December 31, 2013, Koeltl ordered Stewart released from federal prison due to her terminal breast cancer. Koeltl cited the incurable nature of Stewart's disease and the "relatively limited risk" of recidivism and danger to the community upon release. At 74 years old, she was released from the Federal Medical Center Carswell in Texas where she had served over four years of her sentence. Stewart died in March 2017.
