= Carceral Apartheid =

2025 nonfiction book by Brittany Friedman

- Cover
- Author: Brittany Friedman
- Language: English
- Subject: Incarceration in the United States
- Genre: Non-fiction
- Publisher: The University of North Carolina Press
- Publication date: 7 January 2025
- Publication place: United States
- Media type: Print, e-book
- Pages: 230 pp.
- ISBN: 978-1469683409

Carceral Apartheid: How Lies and White Supremacists Run Our Prisons is a 2025 book by sociologist and author Brittany Friedman, published by The University of North Carolina Press.

== Synopsis ==
Carceral Apartheid examines how systemic racism and deception shape the U.S. prison system, framing it as a microcosm of a broader strategy to suppress political dissent and reinforce white supremacy. Focusing on California’s prison system from the 1950s onward, the book reveals how officials deliberately targeted Black political activists, using segregation, suppression tactics, and even collusion with white supremacist groups to maintain control. Through interviews and archival research, Friedman exposes how these domestic policies mirror and sustain global patterns of oppression, positioning the prison system as a tool of state violence and political warfare.

== Topics covered ==
=== Part 1: Carceral Apartheid ===
Friedman defines and provides context for the system she has termed carceral apartheid. She provides the following definition.

“State governing through the strategic use of official carceral apparatuses (i.e., police, military, courts, jails, prisons, detention, probation and parole, and surveillance technology) to achieve the imperial management, division, and decimation of radicalized, target populations. These carceral apparatuses rely on their official capacity to engage in legal controls (surveillance, arrest, conviction, imprisonment, and supervision). However, their success in this endeavor is only made possible by their willingness to engage in clandestine controls that are at times extralegal (i.e. disappearances, torture, gladiator fights, lynching, sexual assault, murder, planting evidence, and corrupt alliances between civilians and law enforcement)—to ensure victory over their opponents and maintain sovereignty over how all populations live and die.”

=== Part 2: Obey ===
This section documents the history of indeterminate solitary confinement in California, the 20th Century torture of prisoners for decades by San Quentin medical doctor Leo Stanley, and the torture of Black prisoners using pseudo-science techniques and placement in solitary dungeons called Adjustment Centers. The book contains the first history of this latter practice. Friedman then shifts focus to the rise of the Aryan Brotherhood in California, which features original interviews she conducted with white supremacists.

=== Part 3: Rebel ===
Friedman goes on to cover the rise of the Black Guerrilla Family in California, featuring original interviews with co-founders and early members. This section documents the group’s battles with the Aryan Brotherhood, the Mexican Mafia, and corrupt correctional officers. She also draws in connections between the group and the Attica Prison Uprising in New York.

=== Part 4: Aftermath ===
The final section explains how the Black Guerrilla family was deemed a security threat group and registered prison gang by the Department of Corrections and covers internal battles within the Black Guerrilla Family about the direction of the organization. It then moves on to present-day battles in Pelican Bay State Prison, the Ashker lawsuit to end indeterminate housing in the Pelican Bay Security Housing Unit (for which Friedman served in 2023 as an amicus curiae for a petition for rehearing en banc), and cross-racial prisoner solidarity between organizations such as the Aryan Brotherhood and Black Guerilla Family to push against the Department of Corrections after years of battling each other.

== Reception ==
Carceral Apartheid received positive blurbs from the scholars Michael L. Walker, Laurence Ralph, Nicole Gonzalez Van Cleve, and Reuben Jonathan Miller. It has been reviewed in the California Review of Books, The Indypendent and The Arts Fuse and featured in Ms Magazine and the 2025 Picks for the Blackest Book List. In the months following the book’s release, Friedman has been featured on C-SPAN and interviewed on WUSA9, YES! Magazine, KPFK, Spectrum News, and WVON, among others.
