= Assessment of suicide risk =

Suicide risk assessment is the process of evaluating an individual's likelihood of dying by suicide. While commonly practiced in psychiatric and emergency care settings, suicide risk assessments lack predictive accuracy and do not improve clinical outcomes and it has even been suggested that clinicians doing suicide risk assessments may be putting their "own professional anxieties above the needs of service users and paradoxically, increasing the risks of suicide following self-harm."

== Overview ==
The methodology of suicide risk assessment is to identify warning signs, contributing factors (e.g., mental illness, prior attempts), and protective factors (e.g., family support). However, suicide is a statistically rare event influenced by multiple interacting variables, which makes reliable prediction difficult.

The concept of "imminent suicide risk" is often used to justify emergency interventions but lacks a solid empirical foundation. Some psychiatrists advocate abandoning risk suicide assessment as a clinical tool due to its inaccuracy and potential harm.

Suicide risk assessments, as currently practised, lack sufficient predictive power to guide treatment decisions or prevent suicide reliably. Data suggest that most individuals who die by suicide are not identified as high-risk, and many classified as high-risk do not die by suicide.

== Limitations and meta-analyses ==
A meta-analysis by Large et al. (2016), which reviewed 37 studies involving over 500,000 psychiatric patients, found that although individuals categorized as high-risk were more likely to die by suicide (OR = 4.84), the tools used demonstrated only modest sensitivity (56%) and specificity (79%). Nearly half of suicides occurred in those not identified as high-risk, while most individuals categorized as high-risk did not die by suicide.

A meta-analysis by Joseph C. Franklin (2017) covering 365 longitudinal studies finds that 50 years of research have yielded only slight predictive power for suicidal ideation, attempts, and deaths; no risk factor category clearly outperforms, and accuracy has not improved over time.

Similarly, Carter et al. (2017) found that most suicide risk tools had a positive predictive value below 5%, meaning that the vast majority of those categorized as high-risk would not die by suicide.

== Practice and ethics ==
Despite limited accuracy, many clinicians use structured tools to classify patients as "low," "moderate," or "high" risk. Critics argue that this classification gives a false sense of precision and reflects legal defensiveness more than clinical utility. Undrill (2007) calls this "secondary risk": the risk to organizations or clinicians that arises from managing risk itself. Assessing a patient's primary risk for suicide can expose institutions to liability for possible errors, which is why secondary risk management can impair the quality of primary risk assessment. Baston (2024) argues that suicide risk assessment is necessary as long as medical resources are limited, so that those at high risk have priority over those at low risk. To circumvent the prediction problem, Baston refers to non-traditional conceptions of objective risk that do not rely on probability calculations but on a possible-worlds framework, taking into account a patient's reasons for living and dying rather than risk factors with low predictive power.

There is also frequent conflation of suicide with non-suicidal self-injury (NSSI), although the overlap between these behaviors is limited. Empathic inquiry into an individual's distress, hopelessness, and reasons for living is increasingly considered more clinically valuable than risk stratification.

== Common tools ==
Commonly used instruments in suicide risk assessment include:

- Scale for Suicide Ideation (SSI)
- Modified Scale for Suicide Ideation (MSSI)
- Suicide Intent Scale (SIS)
- Suicidal Affect Behavior Cognition Scale (SABCS)
- Suicide Behaviors Questionnaire-Revised (SBQ-R)
- Reasons for Living Inventory (RFL)

These tools may help structure clinical conversations but none have demonstrated strong predictive validity.

== Emerging research ==
Recent advances in suicide risk assessment are exploring the use of natural language processing and machine learning applied to electronic health records. While these approaches show promise, they remain largely exploratory and have not yet demonstrated consistent clinical utility.

Professor Seena Fazel and colleagues have developed structured, data-driven models to assist suicide risk assessment. These include the Oxford Mental Illness and Suicide tool (OxMIS) and the Oxford Suicide after Self-harm tool (OxSATS), which combine demographic and clinical data to produce probabilistic estimates of suicide risk. These tools show promise in supporting clinical decision-making and may reduce reliance on subjective judgment, although further validation and implementation research is ongoing.

== See also ==
- Suicide prevention
- Columbia Suicide Severity Rating Scale
