= Army Correspondence Course Program =

The Army Correspondence Course Program (ACCP) is a type of distance education and the formal nonresident extension of the United States Army Training and Doctrine Command (TRADOC) service schools' curriculum.

== Overview ==
DA Pamphlet 351–20, The Army Correspondence Course Program Catalog, is an Army publication. The catalog lists all correspondence courses developed and administered by the Army and select Department of Defense activities. The Army Institute for Professional Development (AIPD) publishes a yearly revision of the catalog each October to update the ACCP curriculum and any procedural changes to the program. The entire ACCP curriculum and an electronic enrollment form are also listed at the Army Training Support Center’s Web site. The ACCP Catalog offers two types of study: individual and group.

AIPD's automated student record system limits students to one course enrollment, or to one course enrollment and a subcourse enrollment, at any one time. But, this limitation applies only to the courses and subcourses administered by AIPD. Each subcourse is awarded a specific number of credit hours, noted in ACCP Catalog Chapter 3 at the individual subcourse descriptions and usually included on the title page of a subcourse. The number of credit hours for any given subcourse is based on the estimated time required for a student to read the material and complete all practice exercises and the examination.

There are several Army e Learning programs, a few of which are:

- eArmyU – which allows you to take college classes in your off-duty time and can ably assist you in preparing for a future non-military job.
- DANTES – which stands for Defense Activity for Non-Traditional Education Support and it provides personnel with educational opportunities that are both practical and compatible with life in the military. This form of long-distance learning is an innovative way to keep deployed troops alert, informed, and entertained by implementing satellite, video, and now even Podcast courses.http://army-e-learning.net/

== Sources ==
- Audie G. Lewis (2003). "Army Correspondence Course Program". Career Progression Guide for Soldiers. Stackpole Books. pp. 49–50. ISBN 9780811728232.
