= Incarceration and health =

Mass incarceration is a major problem in the United States. People who have been incarcerated or are currently incarcerated face many challenges including challenges with their health. This Wikipedia article highlights some of the health problems that can come with incarceration by looking at the relationship between children being incarcerated and the health outcomes they have as adults, the health effects of incarcerated people with HIV, the effect of aging on people with a history of incarceration, the effect that the Affordable Care Act has on the health insurance status of people who have been incarcerated, and the mental health of prisoners.

== Youth incarceration and adult health ==
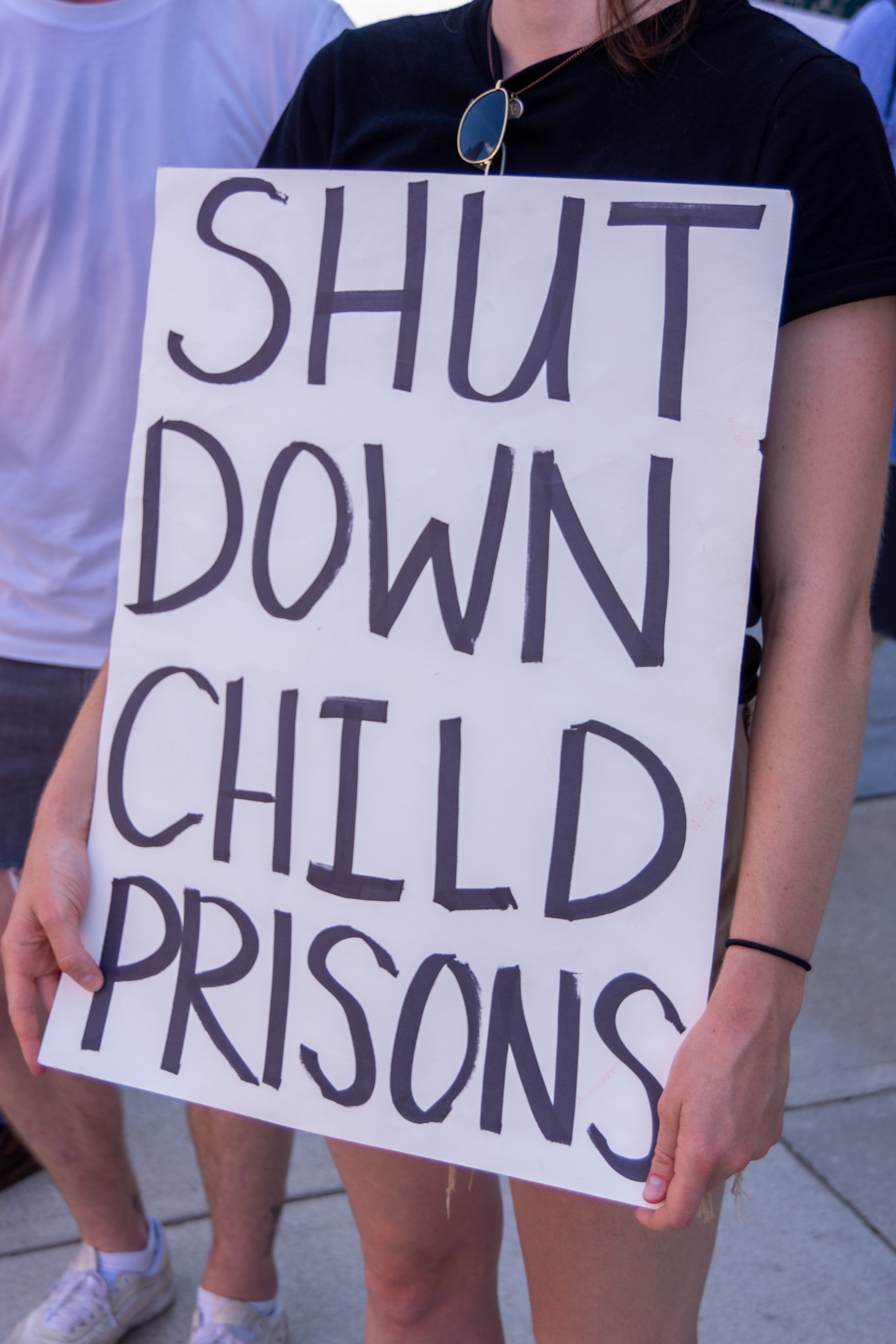
Shut down child prisons.

The number of people being incarcerated in the U.S. has been rapidly increasing over the years. The United States has more children incarcerated than the rest of the world, and in 2015 had 920,000 people arrested under the age of 18. Some people are even arrested when they are younger than 14 and do not get released until well into their adult years. In regards to race it is a fact that African American children are 5 times more likely to be arrested than compared to white children. High proportions of children and adolescents who have been incarcerated have their physical, mental, developmental, and social health needs not being met. These needs being ignored will play a role in the child's future success. Reproductive health needs are also struggling to be met. This will eventually effect the role that HIV plays within incarcerated people and young girls facing teen pregnancy.

The goal was to research the connection between children who have been incarcerated in the United States and the health outcomes they have when they become adults. To do that they analyzed the National Longitudinal Study of Adolescent to Adult Health data from 1727 adults (Wave IV) who were first incarcerated at less than 25 years old. They chose four different health outcomes to compare: these were the general health of adults, mobility limitations, depressive symptoms, and suicidal thoughts.

The researchers used chi-squared tests and multivariate logistic regression models and compared the health outcomes between the subjects whose age at first incarceration fell in the following ranges: less than 14 years old; 15 to 17; 18 to 20; 21 to 24. The sociodemographic data showed that those in the youngest age group included a higher proportion of black or Hispanic people compared to the other age groups. It was also found that there were fewer white participants who were incarcerated as children.

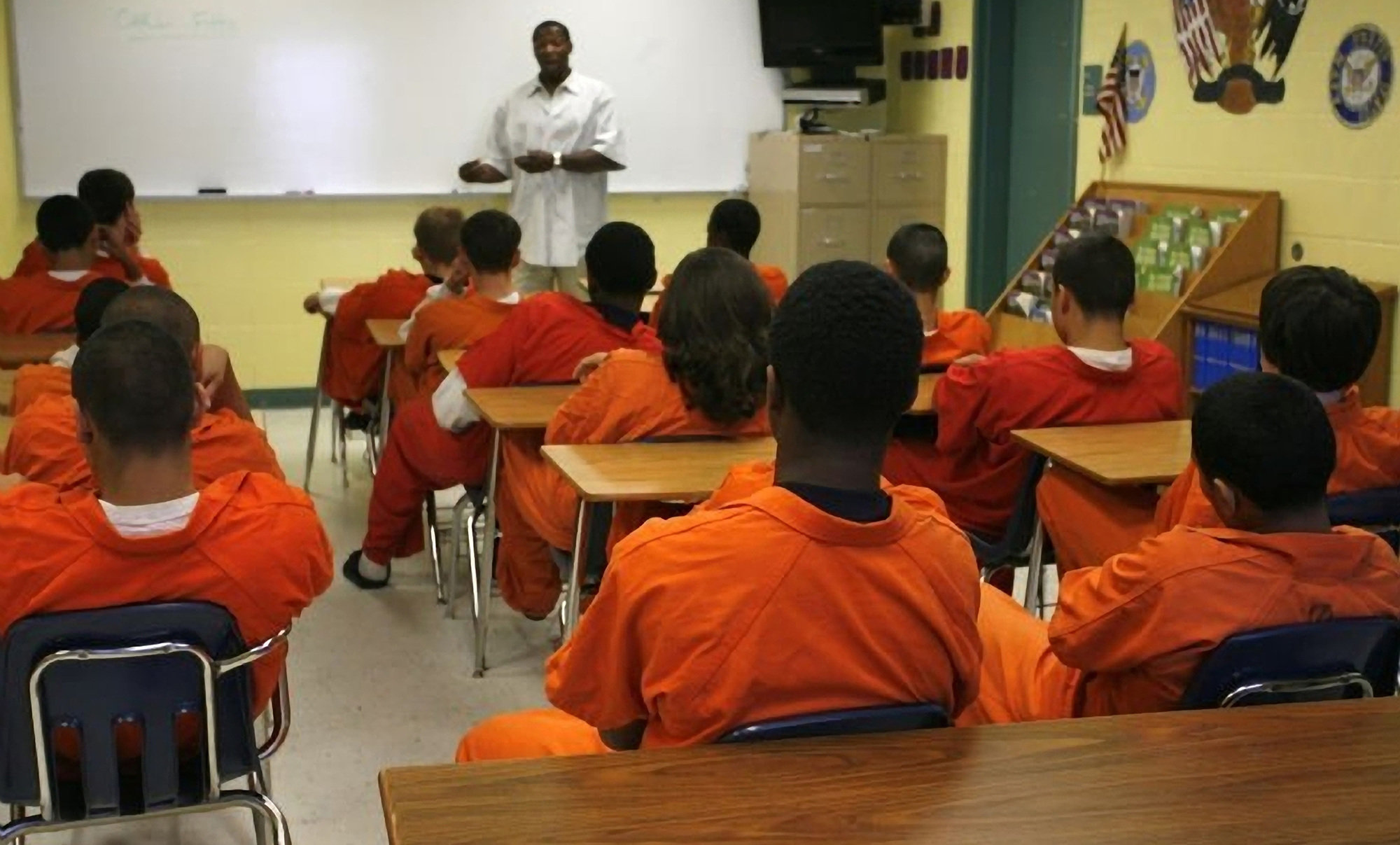
Juveniles continuing their education incarcerated.

The results for the health outcomes were that child incarceration predicted more adult mobility limitations, adult depression, and adult suicidal thoughts compared to people incarcerated when they were 21 to 24. The negative health effects that incarceration can have, especially on children, is a social problem that more people need to focus on. They do not always go unnoticed. Treatment while incarceration can be provided by medication or therapy within the prison. Along with the negative health effects that incarceration can have on children, it also impacts those with HIV.

== Incarceration and HIV ==
Incarceration has negative effects on the overall health of people outside or within prison. HIV is a virus that attacks the immune system which can be life threatening. Every year, around 15% of people with HIV go through a correctional facility in the United States, and 1 in 7 people with HIV are incarcerated every year. The article studied the relationship between incarceration and the health of people with HIV and the mediators present in this relationship. The first mediator that the article studied was substance use. The leading cause of death for people who have been recently released from prison is substance use. The other mediators chosen included the overall health of the people taking part in this study, the decreased adherence to the antiretroviral therapy used to suppress HIV symptoms and the narrow engagement in medical care. The article conducts research on 1,591 patients with HIV, 47% had previously been incarcerated and evidence shows they were low income African Americans with less than a high school education.

The researchers used data from the Veterans Aging Cohort Study (VACS) and found 1,591 HIV-infected veterans and collected data about their overall health and unhealthy drug and alcohol use. They compared these participants with and without a history of incarceration and by their sociodemographic characteristics such as age, gender, education level, housing, and income and the four mediators discussed previously (substance use, overall health, adherence to antiretroviral therapy, and narrow engagement in medical care) using chi square tests and t tests.

Out of the 1,591 people surveyed 47% of them had a history of incarceration and that having been incarcerated was independently associated with a 4.2-point higher VACS index score, equivalent to approximately 15% higher risk of mortality in 5 years. The researchers found that the people with a history of incarceration were more likely to be black, low income, recently homeless and less than a high school education compared to the people who have never been incarcerated. The people who have been incarcerated were also more likely to have used drugs recently and have unhealthy alcohol use. People who were previously incarcerated were less adherent to the antiretroviral therapy than people who have not been incarcerated. Incarcerated and non-incarcerated were equally likely to have received care and engage with their care.

After adjusting their VACS score and taking out recent drug use, they found that drug use had the biggest mediating effect and does play a role in the poor HIV outcomes for previously incarcerated people. Individuals with a history of incarceration were more likely to be engaging in drug use and this accounted for 22% of the association between incarceration and the VACS score. Overall, people who were incarcerated were more likely to have worse HIV outcomes and it is important to bring awareness to the negative health effects that people with HIV who have been or are currently incarcerated can suffer from.

The situation of HIIV does not only effect incarcerated people but the general public as well. This virus is spread through blood or saliva which shows how easy it is to obtain. HIV can be easily transmitted through intercourse and you will show no signs of having it until you take a test or your body shuts down. A study between sexual partners and incarceration history was done to prove association. The study was done by analyzing data from men with valid HIV test results and who completed responses about sexual partners. After the study it was evident that incarceration does introduce sexual partners of past incarceration people to being at a high risk of catching HIV.

== Incarceration and aging ==
Besides affecting people with chronic illnesses and children, incarceration can also affect the health of older adults. The article examined if having a history of incarceration was associated with worse mental and physical health in older adults. The researchers also wanted to see if racism and sexism had an effect on these outcomes. The number of women in the prison system grew by 700% in the span of 30 years so that may be having a drastic effect on their health. Women are more likely to have multiple health conditions. People of color are more likely to be incarcerated than white people and get harsher sentences for the same crime. Black women have the highest incarceration rates among women and are at a higher risk of getting a disease.

To get information on the effects the researcher used the Health and Retirement Survey which is a representative survey of people who are over 50 in the United States and had a sample of 11,883 people. To measure the mental health effects, they asked about depressive symptoms and to measure the physical health effects they examined the physical limitations of the subjects. They wanted to measure three different independent variables and asked questions revolving around their incarceration history, their gender and sex and their race and ethnicity. They used General linear models to assess the effect of the three independent variables and how they interact. Most of the sample was female, White and the average age was 65.

The results showed that incarcerated individuals had more physical limitations and depressive symptoms with men and women who were older than 52. They also found that women who were previously incarcerated had higher rates of health problems specifically women of color who had the highest rates of negative physical and mental health symptoms compared to any other group. This article brings attention to the negative health outcomes that people who have been incarcerated can face especially women of color.

Aging if different for women. Support for women experiencing menopause in incarceration is outlined in the 2009 Kyiv Declaration on Women’s Health in Prison.

== Mental health ==
Mental health disorders have been found to be significantly more prevalent in prison populations than in the general population. New mental health conditions often develop while a person is in prison and pre-existing conditions can worsen. A person suffering from depression will get worse and often suicidal if not getting the correct treatment in or out of prisons. Incarceration is shown to be a chronic stressor due to sleep loss and family separation etc. This traumatic stimulation can cause PTSD within some incarcerated people.

Mental Health VS Prison.

Incarcerated men are three times more likely to die by suicide than non-incarcerated men and incarcerated women are nine times more likely to die by suicide than non-incarcerated women. While in prison, women are more likely to attempt suicide although men are more likely to commit. Women incarcerated also report having done repeated self injury which leads to suicidal behavior. Inmates with mental health issues tend to be among those who are involved in these harming behaviors. The incarceration of juveniles often results in adverse mental health consequences, especially in adult facilities. Such incarceration is also related to worse health across the life course.

=== United States ===
In 2010, half of prisoners in the U.S. had a psychiatric disorder and 15 to 20% had a serious mental illness.

In the 1960s, of the U.S. population in correctional facilities and hospitals that had mental disorders, 75% were in mental hospitals and 25% were incarcerated. As of 2013, the U.S. population of those with mental disorders in correctional facilities and hospitals was 5% in mental hospitals and 95% incarcerated.

Of people that have been incarcerated before in the U.S., recidivism rates are between 50% and 230% higher for persons with mental health conditions than those without any.

Incarcerated people in America have twice the rate of having history of a mental health issue than the general population and five times the rate of PTSD. Depression has been shown to worsen while in prison. Research shows there is little to no mental health benefit of prisons, unlike physical fitness. Incarceration shifts ones life which causes disruptions and tensions. These tensions increase ones mental health to an all time low. Isolation also correlates with depression that stems from being incarceration.

== Incarceration and health insurance ==
Incarceration often has a negative effect on health, and it has been shown that health can worsen during imprisonment and after being released. The health disruptions that incarceration can cause are concerning and one of them is the disturbances in health care. The article evaluated the association between a history of incarceration, whether people have health insurance, and if living in a state using the Affordable Care Act served as a mediator. They used data from the National Longitudinal Study of Adolescent to Adult Health from Wave V from 2016-2018 using data from 8,965 people. The sample's age range (33-34 years) is focused on those in prime age in labor force participation. The authors then used multiple logistic regression to see how ACA Medicaid expansion and people who have been previously incarcerated interact to see if the affiliation between history of incarceration and the status of health insurance is different if the respondent lives in a state with ACA Medicaid expansion.

The researchers found that 91.3% of people said they had insurance, a subset of 14.9% had public insurance, 13.7% had been previously incarcerated, and 69.9% of the respondents lived in a state with ACA Medicaid expansion. They found that people who have been incarcerated were less likely to have insurance, ACA Medicaid expansion was positively associated with being insured and they found that being previously incarcerated and Medicaid expansion on public health insurance were statistically significant.

In states without ACA expansion, the probability of being on public health insurance is 8.8% for those without a history of incarceration and 7.3% for those with a history of incarceration. However, in states with ACA expansion, the predicted probability of being on public insurance is 16.3% for those without a history of incarceration and 23.7% for those with a history of incarceration. Consistent with prior literature, the findings suggest that formerly incarcerated persons are less likely to have insurance and that ACA Medicaid expansion is associated with a greater likelihood of being insured. The results also show that ACA Medicaid expansion disproportionately benefits previously incarcerated persons in terms of enrolling in public health insurance programs. The findings are a reminder that despite the potential benefits of the ACA for improving healthcare access among formerly incarcerated people, the states that have not yet adopted the ACA are primarily concentrated in the South and are also the states with the highest concentration of uninsured populations and rates of incarceration.

== Cardiovascular effects ==
Former prisoners have higher odds of hospitalization and death from cardiovascular disease, even after controlling for socioeconomic status and race.

== Overall ==
The relationship between incarceration and health, compared to research on other social effects of incarceration, has been a topic of research for a relatively short period of time. Most of the foundational research on this topic was conducted in the 25 years before 2015, and indicates that incarceration generally has negative effects on prisoners' mental health, but some positive effects on their physical health. In the United States, the negative health effects of incarceration contribute to racial disparities in health between white and black women.

== See also ==
- Mentally ill people in United States jails and prisons – Incarceration of people with psychiatric disorders
- Prison healthcare – Medical treatment in penal institutions
- Prisoner suicide – Suicide by an inmate in a jail or prison
