= Brittany Friedman =

American sociologist

- Friedman in 2026 at LA event
- Born: 1989 (age 36–37)
- Education: Ph.D. Northwestern University
- Occupations: Sociologist associate professor of sociology at the University of Southern California
- Known for: carceral apartheid, racist intent, truth-telling as method, sociology of punishment, law, social control, cover-ups & politics
- Notable work: Carceral Apartheid: How Lies and White Supremacists Run Our Prisons
- Relatives: Warren Bryant (American football) Glen Coffee Mildred D. Taylor
- Awards: DDRI, National Science Foundation; Ruth D. Peterson Fellowship, American Society of Criminology; Access to Justice Faculty Scholar, American Bar Foundation; American Fellow, American Association of University Women; Raubenheimer Award University of Southern California
- Website: www.brittanyfriedman.com

Brittany Michelle Friedman is an American sociologist and author. Her research spans the sociology of law, sociology of race, political sociology, economic sociology, and criminal justice.

Friedman is known for introducing and developing the concept of "carceral apartheid," which introduces the notion of "racist intent" to center the state's role in arming white supremacist civilians as a means of racialized social control. Friedman theorizes how carceral apartheid operates as political warfare and deploys official levels of control through the criminal justice system and mass incarceration, extralegal levels of control through white supremacist alliances with law enforcement and other means, and through clandestine levels of control that seek to distort narratives, hide the truth, and wield criminal labels against oppressed populations in order to destroy them.

She has done extensive research on social control and cover-ups, the Black Guerilla Family, the black power movement behind bars, and the financialization of the criminal legal system as seen with pay to stay. She is a frequent commentator on public media outlets on topics related to institutional misconduct, cover-ups, prison reform, and racism. Her most notable work is the book Carceral Apartheid: How Lies and White Supremacists Run Our Prisons.

== Early life and education ==
Friedman was born outside of Columbus, Ohio to African American parents of Creole and Gullah ancestry from small rural towns in the Missouri Bootheel. Much of her family came to Missouri by way of the Deep South, namely the Carolinas, Georgia, Louisiana, Mississippi, and Tennessee, among other states. She comes from the Jenkins, Logan, Davis, Avery, McDougal, and McMichael families of these states. Friedman also has family that migrated from the Deep South to West Coast states such as California and Oregon. Friedman's maternal grandmother, Early Ida Marie Coffee Wilderness Avery, was born in 1914 and a sharecropper who participated in the Missouri Sharecroppers Protest of 1939 organized by the Southern Tenant Farmer's Union. Friedman's parents attended Lincoln University, an HBCU in Jefferson City, Missouri, founded after the Civil War. She grew up in Jefferson City and as a child was considered a gifted musician and poet, known for spending most of her time reading, creating music, and playing sports. Her youth was heavily influenced by Black writers, musicians, and athletes, who inspired her to passionately pursue her dreams. She submitted her first poem for publication as an elementary school student. Friedman is an alumna of Jefferson City High School and as a senior was one of two African American young women elected to the 2007 homecoming court in a town known for its contentious racial politics.

Friedman left Jefferson City to enroll at Vanderbilt University on an engineering scholarship, but quickly changed her major to history beginning in her sophomore year. Majoring in history profoundly shaped Friedman's intellectual outlook, with Ida B. Wells becoming one of her intellectual heroines. Her experiences studying and researching abroad in Australia and Brazil also deeply impacted her understanding of settler colonialism and the Black diaspora. Before completing her master's degree and doctorate in sociology at Northwestern University, she earned a master's degree in Latin American and Caribbean Studies from Columbia University in 2013. Friedman was particularly shaped by the mentorship of John Hagan, Mary Pattillo, and Aldon Morris, and the Northwestern tradition of DuBoisian sociology.

== Career ==
Friedman is currently appointed as Associate Professor of Sociology at the University of Southern California and Faculty Affiliate of the Black Studies Center, Sol Price Center for Social Innovation, and the Equity Research Institute. She is co-founder of the Captive Money Lab and host of the podcast Exploitation Nation.

She began her career as a tenure-track faculty member at Rutgers University in New Brunswick, New Jersey.

Friedman's research has won numerous fellowships, including support from the National Science Foundation, the American Society of Criminology, American Association of University Women, and the American Bar Foundation.

Friedman is featured in the 2024 political documentary Untruth: The Psychology of Trumpism, directed by 2x Emmy winner Dan Partland.

== Awards and honors (selected) ==
- DDRI, National Science Foundation, 2017
- Ruth D. Peterson Fellowship, American Society of Criminology, 2014
- Access to Justice Faculty Scholar, American Bar Foundation, 2021
- American Fellow, American Association of University Women, 2023
- Raubenheimer Award, University of Southern California, 2024
