= List of Enchanter chapters =

Japanese manga cover of Kikou Majutsushi -enchanter- Vol.1 as published by Square Enix

The chapters of Enchanter are written and illustrated by Izumi Kawachi. The manga started serialisation in Square Enix's manga magazine, Monthly Gangan Wing in October 2002. Square Enix released the first tankōbon of the manga on January 27, 2003. Nine-teen tankōbon volumes have been released in Japan with the 19th volume released on March 27, 2009. The manga is licensed in North America by Digital Manga Publishing. Digital Manga Publishing released the first tankōbon volume on July 1, 2006. Ten tankōbon volumes have been released in North America with the 10th volume released on February 25, 2009.

Protagonist Haruhiko Kanou, a regular high school student, meets Eukanaria, a demon, during her quest to find a body for her late lover, Fulcanelli. Coincidentally, Eukanaria looks very similar to Yuka Fujikawa, Kanou's next door neighbour and teacher.

== Volume list ==
No.	Original release date	Original ISBN	English release date	English ISBN
1	January 27, 2003	978-4-757-50865-1	July 1, 2006	978-1-56970-866-8
Enchant 1 - "Target Lock On!"; Enchant 2 - "The Other Enchanter-pt.1"; Enchant 3 - "The Other Enchanter-pt.2"
Science teacher Yuka Fujiwara personally requests her mechanical-genius childhood friend and student, Haruhiko Kanou to fix up a VHS set and her MD player. After Yuka leaves, Eukanaria, a demon who look exactly like Yuka, enters the room via a portal, fleeing from Neraga, a demon beast. She claims that Haruhiko has the same scent as Fucanelli, her late partner, who Haruhiko strongly resembles. She gives Haruhiko a knife to defeat Neraga but he loses it. She forces him through a portal to make her a new weapon at Fucanelli's workshop. There, she explains that she wants to find a receptacle to put Fucanelli's soul in. They discover that there is a demon-stone in Yuka's MD player. Haruhiko uses it to create a weapon from Fucanelli's blueprints. Meanwhile, Neraga attacks Yuka and takes her to the school's rooftop. Fucanelli lends some of his power to Haruhiko so that he can banish Neraga. Fucanelli's power allows Haruhiko to be an enchanter, a creator of objects imbued with demonic power. The next day, Eukanaria follows Haruhiko to school in her bee form. Haruhiko sees Yuka having Neraga like a pet rat on her shoulder. She claims that other teachers cannot see Neraga except the geography teacher. When Eukanaria and Haruhiko leave, the geography teacher attacks Yuka for Fucanelli's power, thinking she is Fucanelli's woman. Eukanaria and Haruhiko intervene but they jump out of a window from the third floor to prevent further damage to the classroom. Haruhiko suffers a long cut down the spine. Ai, Parcelsus' servant, intervenes and helps them escape. Ai warps them to Parcelsus' room who appears as a skeleton and introduces himself as an enchanter and physician. He heals Haruhiko's wound. He forces Eukanaria into a room to use her body as payment for his services. She knocks him out with a punch. Haruhiko creates a new weapon and defeats the geography teacher with it. At night, Haruhiko complains about Eukanaria sleeping together with him.
2	March 2003	978-4-757-50952-8	November 1, 2006	978-1-56970-865-1
Enchant 4 - "The Kotatsu, the Tangerine and the Soul-Steal"; Enchant 5 - "Anarazelround"; Enchant 6 - "The One Who Changed Me"; Enchant 7 - "That Which to Reject and That Which to Accept"
Haruhiko sleeps during Yuka's chemistry class because he cannot sleep with Eukanaria sleeping half-naked next to him. Haruhiko asks Okada for notes on the upcoming test. Okada said that he will give them to him at Haruhiko's house after school. When Haruhiko arrives home, Eukanaria attempts to take his soul. He tricks her into explaining the ways that she can take his soul from his body. They are: signing a contract, die, have sex (there is a moment when the soul becomes unstable) or when he loses the will to live. After Eukanaria realises she has been tricked, she warps out of the room. Pretending to be Yuka, she reappears at Haruhiko's front door with only a towel on and jumps into his arms. Okada arrives at that moment with Haruhiko's notes. A new cave, Anarazelround, has appeared and demons are heavily competing with each other for demon stones in the cave. Consequently, Parcelsus has an increase in patients and all of his tools are broken. He requests five knives to be made from Haruhiko. Eukanaria and Haruhiko go to Anarazelround to get the demon-stones. There they meet enchanter, Adolf, and his demon partner, Lavoix. Together they find the guardian of the cave, Anarazel, and defeat him. As a reward, Anarazel gives Eukanaria a "Ring of Forgetfulness".
3	September 2003	978-4-757-51027-2	February 1, 2007	978-1-56970-864-4
Enchant 8 - "The Magic touch"; Enchant 9 - "Extracurricular Studies"; Enchant 10 - "Tangent"; Enchant 11 - "A Knight's Melancholy"
While Eukanaria goes to get her "Ring of Forgetfulness" appraised, Parcelsus makes Yuka come to Haruhiko's house to cook for him under the pretext that Haruhiko is having a cold. When Eukanaria comes back, she makes Yuka forget the events of the past hour with her "Ring of Forgetfulness". While in her bee form, Eukanaria follows Haruhiko to school to help him reseatch the materials needed to make Parcelsus' knives. She changes into bodily form while in class and the students mistake her for Yuka. She takes the class outside to play dodgeball. After class, Eukanaria warps Haruhiko and herself to meet Hilbrecht, the appraiser, and Yamato, the blacksmith. There, Haruhiko sees Adolf bring scolded by Yamato. Under Yamato's strict instructions, Haruhiko creates his first knife. Meanwhile, Yuka and Okada are attacked by a spider demon. Ai intervenes and warps Okada to Yamato's workshop. Okada informs Haruhiko that Yuka is being attacked. With Eukanaria, both boys warp back and defeat the spider together, rescuing Ai and Yuka in the process. Haruhiko creates the five knives and gives them to Parcelsus.
4	January 27, 2004	978-4-757-51128-6	May 1, 2007	978-1-56970-863-7
Enchant 12 - "Under the Blue, Blue Arc of Time - Part 1"; Enchant 13 - "Under the Blue, Blue Arc of Time - Part 2"; Enchant 14 - "Under the Blue, Blue Arc of Time - Part 3"; Enchant 15 - "Under the Blue, Blue Arc of Time - Part 4"
Mana Kimura, from a bike shop family, offers to fix her friend's bike's flat tyre. Haruhiko comes along and offers his help to prevent her clothes from being dirtied. Mana is revealed to have a crush on Haruhiko. Haruhiko's class is going to Hawaii for their class trip. Mana asks Haruhiko to fix her friend's phone. He invites her to his house. To prevent Mana from seeing Eukanaria, he lends her his laptop. When Haruhiko's friends see Eukanaria (who they think is Yuka) on top of Haruhiko before the school trip, they demand an explanation. Okada explains the situation to them at their hotel in Hawaii. Mana's friends see Haruhiko and Eukanaria together and they criticise Yuka for being involved with a student. At the same time, Mana and Haruhiko are attacked by the crow that she saved, albeit a demon in human form. Haruhiko and Mana escapes the attack by jumping to his hotel room 17 floors above. Neraga tells Haruhiko that Yuka is being attacked. Mana and Haruhiko defuse the situation between Mana's friend and Yuka. After Eukanaria gives Haruhiko his weapon, his battle with the crow resumes.
5	June 2004	978-4-757-51225-2	August 1, 2007	978-1-56970-862-0
Enchant 16 - "Under the Blue, Blue Arc of Time - Part 5"; Enchant 17 - "Bombs and Landmines"; Enchant 18 - "Compassion"; Enchant 19 - "The Prank"; Enchant 20 - "For You"
During his fight with the crow, Haruhiko manages to trap the crow within his weapon. Mana agrees to be the crow's enchanter. Eukanaria gets jealous about his heroic actions for Mana and vents her anger on Haruhiko and Motoki before warping to Fucanelli's workshop. Haruhiko enters the workshop later to see Eukanaria sleeping. He scans Eukanaria's memory and sees Eukanaria's dream about Fucanelli slightly scolding a submissive Eukanaria for giving him her power rendering her unable to fly. The next day, Haruhiko gives Yuka her MD player back. He also gives Mana an enchanted box containing the crow. Neraga frantically gestures to Haruhiko that he cannot see Yuka. Eukanaria explains that it is because of the demon stone in Yuka's MD player. Haruhiko goes to Yuka's room to get the MD player but she answers the door in a bikini due to Eukanaria's scheme. Haruhiko sees through the trap and takes Yuka to buy clothes. At the shop, he sees Mana buying clothes for the crow (in human form), Navy. Haruhiko allows Neraga to see Yuka by removing the demon stone from Yuka's MD player. Haruhiko requests training from Parcelsus.
6	October 27, 2004	978-4-757-51299-3	November 1, 2007	978-1-56970-861-3
Enchant 21 - "Unmuddied Stream"; Enchant 22 - "So Near and Yet So Far"; Enchant 23 - "El Arma El Verba Vulnerant" (Latin: Weapons and Words Both Harm); Enchant 24 - "Untruth"
Lavoix makes a fuss about an enchanted piano Adolf made for a local girl. Parcelsus tests Haruhiko's fighting abilities and criticises him for not making any judgements while fighting. When Haruhiko warps back to his house, Eukanaria informs that Lavoix and Adolf have come over to stay. Parcelsus has referred Haruhiko to Yamato for training. At Yamato's workshop, Haruhiko meets Mana and Navy as well as the engraver, Mercurio. Meanwhile, Adolf drains Eukanaria of her power and is willing to use her as a bargaining chip for Fucanelli's power. Lavoix needs this power to go back to the demon world. Haruhiko refuses the offer and forces Lavoix and Adolf to express their feeling for each other.
7	February 26, 2005	978-4-757-51372-3	February 12, 2008	978-1-56970-860-6
Enchant 25 - "Ave verum corpus" (Latin: Hail, True Body); Enchant 26 - "The Teacher and I"; Enchant 27 - "Repair"; Enchant 28 - "First Love"
Haruhiko helps Adolf to finish the piano when it is done Adolf and Ingrid (the one that Adolf made the piano for) comes back. When Ingrid starts to play Lavoix burst into tears. Haruhiko are going back to his place completely forgetting to bring back Eukanaria's powers he turns back to get it. Meeting up with Adolf and exchanging some words before he gives Eukanaria her powers. Back at school Haruhiko returns the bento box that contained the food Yuka gave Haruhiko. He bought a thank you present for Yuka but when Eukanaria saw it she wanted one to. Haruhiko are trying to talk to Fulcanelli but doesn't find anything that works. After no progress Haruhiko decides to take a breather and train with Yamato. When he got to Yamato's workshop he had to wait for Yamato. After the training Haruhiko is back in school where Mercurio meet up with him to give him a present. Later Eukanaria tells him that Mercurio has two personalities.
8	June 27, 2005	978-4-757-51395-2	May 13, 2008	978-1-56970-859-0
Enchant 29 - "A Place In the Sun"; Enchant 30 - "Let's Go To School"; Enchant 31 - "Distress Call"; Enchant 32 - "The Special Part"
9	October 27, 2005	978-4-757-51557-4	August 12, 2008	978-1-56970-858-3
Enchant 33 - "Even If It Was A Mistake"; Enchant 34 - "Repentance"; Enchant 35 - "Utility"; Enchant 36 - "The Kokonoe Siblings"
10	February 27, 2006	978-4-757-51630-4	February 25, 2009	978-1-56970-857-6
Enchant 37 - "Cat and Fish"; Enchant 38 - "Amor magister est optimus 1" (Latin: Love is the best teacher 1); Enchant 39 - "Amor magister est optimus 2"(Latin: Love is the best teacher 2); Enchant 40 - "Amor magister est optimus 3" (Latin: Love is the best teacher 3)
11	June 27, 2006	978-4-757-51711-0	—	—
Enchant 41 - "Amor magister est optimus 4" (Latin: Love is the best teacher 4); Enchant 42 - "Amor magister est optimus 5" (Latin: Love is the best teacher 5); Enchant 43 - "Amor magister est optimus 6" (Latin: Love is the best teacher 6); Enchant 44 - "Amor magister est optimus 7" (Latin: Love is the best teacher 7)
12	October 27, 2006	978-4-757-51804-9	—	—
Enchant 45 - "Amor magister est optimus 8" (Latin: Love is the best teacher 8); Enchant 46 - "Amor magister est optimus 9" (Latin: Love is the best teacher 9); Enchant 47 - "Amor magister est optimus 10" (Latin: Love is the best teacher 10); Enchant 48 - "Amor magister est optimus 11" (Latin: Love is the best teacher 11)
13	March 27, 2007	978-4-757-51974-9	—	—
14	July 27, 2007	978-4-757-52057-8	—	—
15	November 27, 2007	978-4-757-52165-0	—	—
16	March 27, 2008	978-4-757-52246-6	—	—
17	July 27, 2008	978-4-757-52334-0	—	—
18	March 27, 2009	978-4-757-52335-7	—	—
19	March 27, 2009	978-4-757-52520-7	—	—
