= Menopause in incarceration =

Menopause in incarceration is a social and policy campaigning issue in which people work to raise awareness of the gender specific impact menopause symptoms can have on people in prison. Although women are a minority of those incarcerated, the age of women in the prison system is increasing across the world. As this happens it becomes necessary for inmates to be assessed for menopausal symptoms and offered the gender and age-specific services and support they need. Researchers have identified this as a gap in prison healthcare which leaves the needs of many people unmet.

== Background ==
Menopausal women experience a range of medical and health issues whether or not they are in prison. Particular aspects of incarceration, however, may exacerbate the experience of menopause and these are the responsibility of organisations making health policy. In the US, a third of older women prisoners say they are concerned about it. Menopause is an inter-sectional issue in women's health as it combines gender and age. Incarceration brings a complex combination of inequality factors for women's needs in terms of menstruation, pregnancy, contraception, post-natal health, mental health and menopause. In countries where prisons are privatized, women's health needs may be seen as low priority.

In prisons access to hygiene and medical supplies are restricted, and it is difficult to regulate the temperature of rooms. Peri-menopause leads to erratic periods and many women experience frequent hot-flashes. Many facilities do not provide access to locally controlled air conditioning or fans which are needed to regulate and relieve hot flashes, which are a common symptom of menopause. Additional layers of clothing may be needed for increased comfort during hot flashes and night sweating. The symptoms of menopause may also include mental health issues such as feelings of shame, embarrassment, short-temper, loneliness and depression which are challenging to manage for well-being in prison. In the UK, 65% of women in prison suffer from depression. Shame and embarrassment results from physical changes but also from societal norms in which menopause continues to be a 'taboo subject'. Women inmates in prisons report that their concerns were often dismissed.

There are additional physical complications as menopause often brings osteoporosis and in prisons the weight-bearing exercises and extra support may not be available to help in treatment. In the UK the health of older prisoners is seen to be worse than that of the wider community and many have additional disabilities or long-standing illness.

== International perspectives ==
In the USA the fastest-growing segment of the prison population is women but health systems which have been designed for men fail to meet their needs. The National Commission on Correctional Health Care recognize the need for standards in care in jails and prisons.

The UK Government has set standards for care of women in prison which includes appropriate treatment and support for transition through the menopause and access to the similar standards of care as they would have in the community. Women are offered access to hormone replacement therapy and the option to change their sheets frequently if they suffer from night sweats.

In 2009 the Kyiv Declaration on Women's Health in Prison reviewed issues affecting women's health in the criminal justice system. The Declaration raises awareness of the differences in health needs between men and women prisoners. The World Health Organisation considers that prison health services contribute to the social well-being of all of society and suggests that prisons should have written policies showing the practices that are sensitive to women. The United Nations 2010 Rules for the Treatment of Women Prisoners and Non-custodial Measures for Women Offenders are known as 'The Bangkok Rules'. The 70 Rules give guidance to cover healthcare and humane treatment .
