= Leo Stanley =

American surgeon (1886–1976)

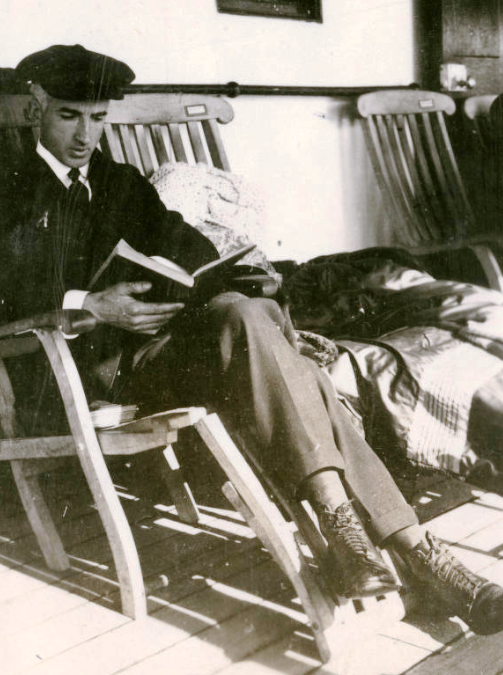
- Stanley at San Quentin, c. 1915
- Born: Leo Leonidas Stanley; 1886; Buena Vista, Oregon, United States
- Died: 1976 (aged 90)
- Education: Stanford University; Cooper Medical College
- Occupation: Surgeon
- Employer: San Quentin State Prison
- Spouses: Romaine (m. 1912; died 1926) Bernice Holthouse (m. 1938)

Leo Leonidas Stanley (1886 – 1976) was an American surgeon who served as the Chief Surgeon of the San Quentin State Prison from 1913 to 1951. He was most notable for performing unethical human experiments on inmates during his tenure.

== Biography ==
=== Early life ===
Stanley was born in Buena Vista, Oregon. His father was a country doctor. When Stanley was 9, the family moved to San Luis Obispo County, California, where he studied at Paso Robles High School.

In 1903, Stanley studied at the Stanford University. In 1904, he dropped out and worked as a newsboy on the Southern Pacific railway, though he eventually returned to Stanford to finish his degree. In 1908, he began studying to be a medical doctor at the Cooper Medical College in San Francisco, and graduated in 1912. A month before his graduation, Stanley married Romaine Stanley, who was a secretary at the college.

=== Career at San Quentin ===
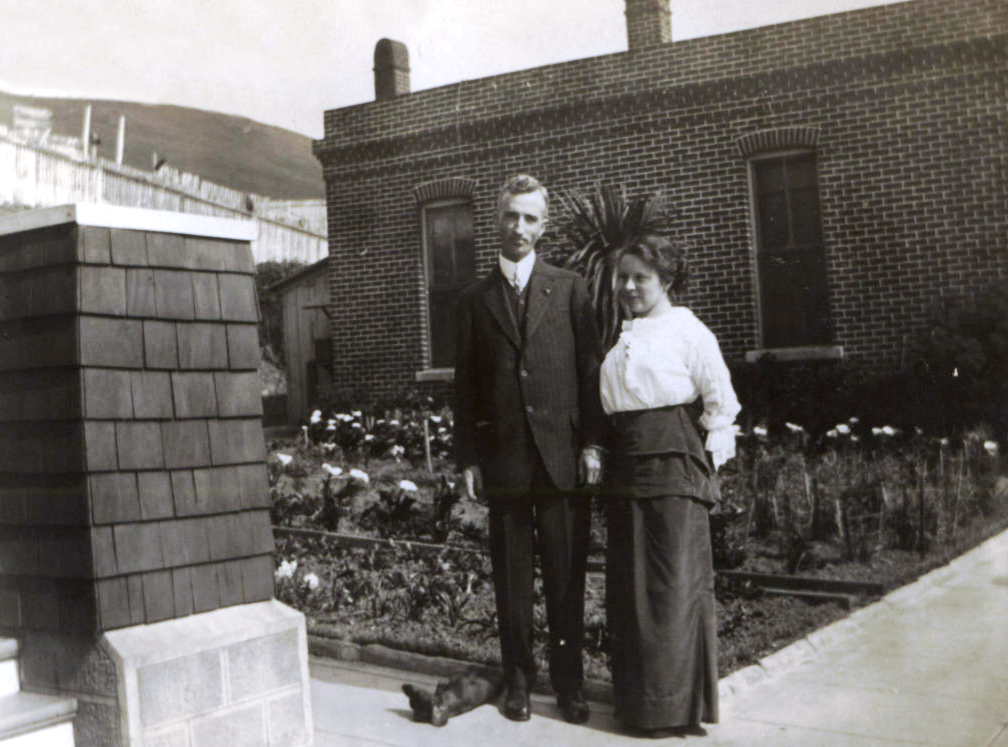
Stanley and his wife at San Quentin, c. 1915

In 1913, despite having no surgical experience, Stanley was hired as the Chief Surgeon for San Quentin State Prison. Stanley believed that diseases, in particular endocrine diseases, were the cause of crime, and wrote in his memoir that "perhaps the outworn glands look for solace in strange directions." He was a strong supporter of testicles grafting. The now-debunked theory that testicular transplant could cause male rejuvenation and age reversal was first proposed in 1889 and grew popular during the 1920s. Stanley performed grafting experiments on prisoners, transplanting testicles from executed prisoners to other inmates. Animal testicles (from goats, boars, rams, and deer) were also used, if testicles could not be procured from executed prisoners. Stanley believed that these procedures could cure afflictions such as pedophilia, depression, asthma, acne, neurasthenia and melancholia. By 1919, Stanley was recognized by the United Press Dispatch as "an international figure in the surgical world through his successful operations in rejuvenating old and senile prisoners by transplanting the interstitial glands of murderers who have paid the law’s penalty." In 1928, Stanley was sued by the family of executed inmate Clarence Kelly for mutilation of a corpse, though Stanley was not convicted. By 1940, Stanley had performed over 10,000 testicular implants in San Quentin.

Stanley was also a proponent of racial segregation and eugenics. Stanley's legacy is covered extensively in Chapter 2 of the book Carceral Apartheid. While racial segregation was not enforced in San Quentin when Stanley arrived, Stanley oversaw the building of a new hospital that allowed segregation. Californian laws at the time allowed Stanley to forcibly sterilize inmates, though only up to a certain proportion. As a result, Stanley also encouraged voluntary sterilization, which led to around 600 total sterilization by 1940 and San Quentin far outpacing other Californian prisons in their sterilization program. Amongst those targeted for sterilization were homosexual and bisexual inmates. In his memoir, Stanley stated that "sterilization, when given its chance, will do much to stamp out crime. The right to bear children will in time be reserved to the fit."

Other experiments conducted by Stanley included thyroid removals for badly-behaving inmates and injecting ground-up testicles into the abdomens of inmates. Stanley also performed plastic surgeries on inmates, believing that they would be less likely to commit crimes if their appearances could help them find more work. He encouraged his interns to perform experiments on inmates, explaining that "patients could be under daily observation, and the 'follow up' conditions were ideal."

Contemporary reports mostly praised Stanley's efforts. In particular, the presence of professional medical staff meant that San Quentin was more sophisticated in medical treatments than other United States prison. Prison reformer Austin MacCormick praised San Quentin as one of "the best... in all the state institutions of the country." Stanley, influenced by his wife's struggle with tuberculosis, improved lighting and air-flow at his new hospital.

Stanley's wife Romaine died of tuberculosis in 1926. After her death, Stanley briefly left the prison in 1929 to become the ship's surgeon on the SS Malolo. In 1933, Stanley briefly served as the San Quentin warden when Warden James B. Holohan was recovering from an illness. Stanley remarried Bernice Holthouse in 1938.

=== Second World War ===
In December 1941, shortly following the Japanese attack on Pearl Harbor, Stanley was called into service as a lieutenant commander in the United States Navy Reserve. He was posted to the naval hospital on Mare Island, then the San Francisco Naval Officer Procurement, the Pearl Harbor naval hospital and finally the Treasure Island naval hospital. Meanwhile, U.S. Navy physicians performed medical experiments on San Quentin inmates, many of whom volunteered due to patriotic fervor.

=== Later life and death ===
After the war, he returned to his position at San Quentin, though he would find the newly-reorganized California Department of Corrections now used therapy as the guiding model.

Stanley retired from San Quentin in 1951. He operated a private practice in San Rafael, California, for a short time, and later worked as a physician on cruise ships. In his final years, he stayed at his farm, the Crest Farm, in Marin County, California. He died at the age of 90, with no children.

== Bibliography ==
- Blue, Ethan (1 May 2009). "The Strange Career of Leo Stanley: Remaking Manhood and Medicine at San Quentin State Penitentiary, 1913-1951". Pacific Historical Review. 78 (2): 210–241. doi:10.1525/phr.2009.78.2.210. ISSN 1533-8584.
