= Society of Correctional Physicians =

The American College of Correctional Physicians (ACCP), formerly the Society of Correctional Physicians (SCP), a physician's membership organization formed in 1992, is the professional voice for physicians who practice medicine in jails, prisons, and juvenile facilities.

ACCP is the only membership organization committed solely to meeting the needs of correctional physicians. It promotes professional excellence in the following ways:

- Examines issues specific to the incarcerated and identifies solutions for clinical medical professionals in correctional facilities;
- Disseminates vital medical information at educational conferences, in professional publications, and through peer networking;
- Advocates for adherence to a Code of Ethics that ensures physicians practice the profession responsibly and with the greatest degree of integrity;
- Advocates for medical research and the professional education of students and residents to develop and maintain future excellence in correctional medicine;
- Is at the forefront of efforts to win specialty recognition for correctional physicians, enhancing the stature of the profession and leading to greater public and private support.

Educational conferences are held twice annually, a research publication and newsletter are published quarterly, and a Member Forum provides communication and information sharing among colleagues.

Full membership is available to physicians and associate membership is offered to dentists, physician assistants, and nurse practitioners.

ACCP supported the creation of and endorsed the exam for the newest level of Certified Correctional Health Professional: CCHP-P (CCHP-Physician) from the National Commission on Correctional Health Care.

== Bibliography ==
- Skolnick, Andrew A. (1998). "Critics Denounce Staffing Jails and Prisons With Physicians Convicted of Misconduct". JAMA. 280 (16): 1391–1392. doi:10.1001/jama.280.16.1391. PMID 9800986.
- Brunk, Doug (March 1, 2002). "Correctional medicine can unlock opportunities. (Career Tracks)". Family Practice News.
- Williams, Gail R.; Ducate, Suzanne (October 1, 2004). "Prison doctors in the 21st century.(Section on Internal Medicine)(Brief Article)". Southern Medical Journal. 97 (10 Suppl 1): S6-82. doi:10.1097/01.SMJ.0000143539.87459.3C. PMID 15560018.
- Demsky, Ian (December 11, 2007). "fresh eye on prisoner health system A wait for word on jail care". The News Tribune - Tacoma, Wash. pp. A.1. Archived from the original on October 23, 2012. PIn a letter to the court, Shelton, who has served as president of the Society of Correctional Physicians and is the medical director of Oregon's prison ..."
