= Aging offender =

An aging offender or an elderly offender is an individual over the age of 55 who breaks the law or is in prison.

== History of the concept ==
The First Annual Conference on Elderly Criminals took place in 1982 in Albany, New York. This, along with the dates of a number of investigations into the issues surrounding aging offenders, highlights the issue as one that has come to notice only recently. This is mainly a result of general views of criminologists that age has no impact on offending, and that offenders tail off as age increases. This issue is also compounded due to the vague definition of the term "old" in a quantitative state.

Early investigations in 1984 were the earliest into links between age and crime, investigating rates of murder, abuse and theft through different age ranges. Concerns over differing sentences for those of different ages were also raised. Criminal Justice System officials of Maryland in the United States recorded a rise in the percentage of inmates over 55 from 4.9% to 6.8% between 1990 and 1997, and in 2001 Maryland predicted that 225,000 elderly offenders would be incarcerated by 2005. Again by 2001, the National Institute of Corrections recorded that 23 of the 50 Departments of Corrections across the US provided for elderly inmates.

== Issues of an aging prison population ==
The US National Institute of Corrections identified a number of issues relating to an aging prison population structure, including both physical and mental health, death, nutritional problems, the social and emotional needs of elderly inmates, and the need to recognise differences between normal aging and aging accelerated by being in prison.

=== Health ===
Health care is identified as a paramount concern, because in many countries elderly inmates do not qualify for state funded healthcare, with the US National Institute of Corrections identifying that inmates over 60 cost three times more than those of a younger age to house in prison. It was calculated in 2006 that prisoners over the age of 55 on average suffer from three chronic ailments for which continual medication is required. Such issues were highlighted in both Maryland, Iowa and Utah State corrections reports for 2001, 2004 and 2006 respectively. The latter recorded an increase from 3.5% to 5.2% of the total prison population being classed as elderly offenders. A total of 13% was calculated for 2010, with Utah also concluding that medical care would be the most costly problem of the aging prison structure.

The Alberta Law Foundation Situational Report of 1995 also stated that: "aging is an ongoing process and is effected by cultural and environmental experiences that may influence coping, adaptation and behaviour. Incarceration tends to accelerate the aging process"

=== Adjustment ===
Surveys conducted of criminals over the age of 55 being imprisoned for the first time revealed higher stress rates and a greater difficulty to adjust. This is both due to the culture shock, and overcoming the difficulties of having led a criminal-free life for a longer period of time and thus finding it more difficult to come to terms with breaking the law. Physical weakness or mental fragility in relation to younger inmates, and the fact that offenders are cut off from their families can also have a great impact on aging offenders.

=== Evolution of criminal tendencies ===
In many cases, as the age of an offender increases the likelihood of re-offending decreases, as the elderly are less capable of coping with a criminal lifestyle and grow tired of being punished. However, as a criminal ages the type of crime can evolve, with crimes such as embezzlement, fraud, gambling and drunkenness either being unlimited by age or peaking when a criminal is of the age of 50 or above.
