= Toni Carabillo =

American historian (1926–1997)

- Carabillo in 1972
- Born: Virginia Ann Carabillo; March 26, 1926; Jackson Heights, Queens
- Died: October 28, 1997 (aged 71); Los Angeles, California
- Education: Middlebury College; Columbia University
- Occupations: Graphic designer, historian, feminist
- Era: Second-wave feminism
- Known for: Co-founded the Feminist Majority Foundation
- Partner: Judith Meuli

Toni Carabillo (March 26, 1926 – October 28, 1997) was an American feminist, graphic designer, and historian.

She was born Virginia Ann Carabillo on March 26, 1926, in Jackson Heights, Queens. She graduated from Middlebury College in 1948 and earned her Master of Arts degree from Columbia University in 1949.

== Career ==
She worked for System Development Corporation as assistant manager of corporate communications for 11 years. She ended her job there after she participated in an unauthorized survey of women employees that showed sex discrimination in advancement and salaries. She joined the National Organization for Women (NOW) in 1966. She founded Women's Heritage Corporation in 1969. The business published a series of paperbacks on women like Lucy Stone and Elizabeth Cady Stanton as well as an almanac and calendar. In 1970, she formed graphic arts firm Women's Graphic Communications with her partner Judith Meuli in Los Angeles. The firm produced and distributed books, newspapers, political buttons, and pins.

In 1977, she became an associate of the Women's Institute for Freedom of the Press (WIFP). WIFP is an American nonprofit publishing organization. The organization works to increase communication between women and connect the public with forms of women-based media.

Carabillo co-founded the Feminist Majority Foundation in 1987 with Meuli, Eleanor Smeal, Katherine Spillar, and Peg Yorkin. Carabillo was national vice president for the organization. She helped to establish California chapters of NOW. She was the president of the Los Angeles chapter as well as a national board member (1968–1977) and vice president (1971–1974). She also co-edited NOW's national publications NOW Acts (1969–1970) and the National NOW Times (1977–1985). Carabillo also edited the National NOW publication Do it NOW with Meuli. They also created a line of feminist jewelry that raised money for NOW and the Equal Rights Amendment campaign.

She co-wrote The Feminization of Power (1988) with Meuli and cowrote the women's studies textbook Feminist Chronicles, 1953-1993 (1993) with Meuli and June Csida. The Feminization of Power grew out of a traveling exhibit that Meuli and Carabillo created for a twelve-city Feminization of Power campaign tour to empower women to run for office in 1988.

Carabillo died of lung cancer on October 28, 1997, in Los Angeles. She had been working on The Feminist Chronicles of the 20th Century at the time of her death.
