= Molly Yard =

American feminist (1912–2005)

- Born: Mary Alexander Yard; July 6, 1912; Shanghai, Imperial China
- Died: September 21, 2005 (aged 93); Dormont, Pennsylvania, U.S.
- Education: Swarthmore College

Mary Alexander "Molly" Yard (July 6, 1912 – September 21, 2005) was an American feminist and social activist who served as the eighth president of the National Organization for Women (NOW) from 1987 to 1991 and was a link between first and second-wave feminism.

== Early life and education ==
She was born in Shanghai, China, the third daughter of Methodist missionaries. Following her birth, a Chinese friend of her father gifted him "a brass bowl, as consolation for her being a 'useless' third daughter". She grew up in Chengdu, Sichuan until she was 13, when her family moved to the United States and settled in Connecticut. Her parents encouraged her to attend college, especially her mother, who had been denied the opportunity.

She graduated in 1933 from Swarthmore College with a degree in political science. While at Swarthmore, she led a successful drive to eliminate sororities at the college in reaction to sororities (including Yard's sorority, Kappa Alpha Theta, and her older sister's sorority, Chi Omega) denying admission to Jewish students was denied admission to her sorority.

== Early career and politics ==
She became active in Democratic Party politics, and in the late 1940s and early 1950s worked with the Clark-Dilworth team to unseat the entrenched city machine in Philadelphia. Two years later, she worked in Helen Gahagan Douglas' unsuccessful campaign for the U.S. Senate against second-year Congressman Richard Nixon's effective campaign attacks on Gahagan Douglas in California.

She moved to Pittsburgh in 1953, where she worked in the gubernatorial campaign of Mayor David L. Lawrence in 1958, led the Western Pennsylvania presidential campaigns of John F. Kennedy in 1960 and George McGovern in 1972, led the unsuccessful campaign to get NAACP President Byrd Brown the Democratic nomination to Congress, and was co-chair with Mayor Joseph M. Barr of the unsuccessful U.S. Senate campaign of state Senator Jeanette Reibman in 1976.

In 1963, Yard was the Western Pennsylvania organizer for the March on Washington. In 1964, she led local protests in favor of the passing of the Civil Rights Act.

She made an unsuccessful run for the state legislature as a candidate from Pittsburgh's Ward 14 in 1964.

In addition to her political work, she helped found Americans for Democratic Action (ADA), America's oldest independent liberal lobbying organization, and the Pittsburgh's 14th Ward Independent Democratic Club. She was also the organization secretary and national chairwoman of the American Student Union.

== Activities in the National Organization for Women ==
She became active in NOW while a resident of the Squirrel Hill neighborhood of Pittsburgh in 1974, and joined the national staff in 1978 during the unsuccessful campaign to ratify the Equal Rights Amendment (ERA), serving as a lobbyist in Washington, D.C. She raised more than $1 million in less than six months for that drive.

A prime architect of NOW's political and legislative agenda, she was a senior staff member of the NOW Political Action Committee from 1978 to 1984. As NOW's political director from 1985 to 1987, she was instrumental in the successful 1986 campaign to defeat anti-abortion referendums in Arkansas, Massachusetts, Rhode Island and Oregon.

She defeated Noreen Connell in the 1987 NOW presidential election. On taking office in August, she vowed to make the organization more visible and work to defeat President Reagan's nomination of Judge Robert H. Bork to the U.S. Supreme Court, which was ultimately rejected by the U.S. Senate. Yard demanded that President Ronald Reagan resign due to the Iran-Contra affair. In September, she was briefly arrested during a nonviolent NOW demonstration at the Vatican Embassy in Washington, D.C. in response to the Catholic Church's stances on birth control, abortion, and homosexuality.

Yard convinced her brother, Lou Harris, "to identify polling results by gender," which allowed Harris to demonstrate gender gaps in voting.

In April 1989, she helped to carry the banner for the March for Women's Equality / Women's Lives, which drew 600,000 marchers to Washington in support of abortion rights and the ERA.

The membership of NOW grew from 80,000 to 250,000 during the years of her presidency and its annual budget increased 70 percent, to $10 million. As NOW president, she opposed U.S. involvement in the Persian Gulf War, saying Americans should not be fighting for "clan-run monarchies" in Kuwait and Saudi Arabia that denied women's rights.

Yard retired in 1991 following a stroke in May of that year.

== Recognition and awards ==
In 1991, she was honored in Paris by the French Alliance of Women for Democratization for her pioneering work in reproductive rights; she had been a leader in the effort to get Paris-based manufacturer Roussel Uclaf to make the so-called "French abortion pill" (the "morning-after pill", RU-486) available in the United States.

She received the Feminist Majority Foundation's lifetime achievement award for "tireless work for women's rights, for women and girls in sports, for the Equal Rights Amendment for Women, for civil rights for all Americans, for her championing of the trade union movement, and her devotion to world peace and non-violence."

== Personal life and death ==
Yard married Sylvester Garrett in 1938 (d. 1996); the couple had two sons and a daughter. Yard did not take Garrett's name upon their marriage, which was unusual for the time. In the late 1980s she lived in Ligonier, Pennsylvania. Following her retirement, Yard lived in Arlington, Virginia.

She died at age 93 at a nursing home in Dormont, a suburb of Pittsburgh, on September 20, 2005.

Preceded by Eleanor Smeal	President of the National Organization for Women; 1987 - 1991	Succeeded by Patricia Ireland
