= Kim Gandy =

American feminist (born 1954)

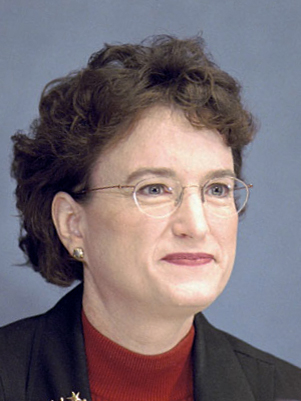
- Gandy in 2001
- Born: January 25, 1954 (age 72); Bossier City, Bossier Parish; Louisiana, USA
- Education: Louisiana Tech University; Loyola University New Orleans School of Law
- Occupations: Attorney; Feminist political activist
- Spouse: Christopher "Kip" Lornell
- Children: Two daughters
- Parent(s): Alfred Kenneth and Roma R. Gandy

Kim Gandy (born January 25, 1954) is an American feminist who, from 2001 to 2009, was the president of the National Organization for Women. Since 2012, she has been the president and CEO of the National Network to End Domestic Violence. In 2009, Gandy was a resident fellow at the Institute of Politics at the John F. Kennedy School of Government at Harvard University in Cambridge, Massachusetts. From January 2010 to October 2012, she was vice president and general counsel at the Feminist Majority Foundation in Arlington, Virginia.

== Life and career ==
Kim Gandy graduated from Louisiana Tech University in Ruston, the seat of Lincoln Parish, where she earned a Bachelor of Science degree in mathematics.

Having taken a job with American Telephone and Telegraph, Gandy became outraged that the firm required her husband's permission for employee benefits. In 1973, she joined Louisiana NOW and devoted the next several years to the campaign that overturned the state's Head and Master law, which gave husbands unilateral control over all property jointly owned by a married couple. Inspired by her activism in NOW, she studied at Loyola University New Orleans School of Law where she was a member of the Loyola Law Review and the National Moot Court Team. She graduated from Loyola in 1978.

Gandy served as a senior assistant district attorney in New Orleans and later opened a private trial practice, litigating cases seeking fair treatment for women. She served as president of Louisiana NOW from 1979 through 1981, national secretary of NOW from 1987 to 1991, and executive vice president of NOW from 1991 to 2001. She was elected national NOW president in 2001 and re-elected to a second term in 2005. She was term-limited in 2009.

In 2006, Gandy was awarded the Humanist Heroine and Humanist Distinguished Service Awards by the American Humanist Association.

Gandy is married to Christopher "Kip" Lornell, an American ethnomusicologist and professor of music at George Washington University in Washington, D.C. The couple have two daughters.

Preceded by Patricia Ireland	President of the National Organization for Women; 2001–2009	Succeeded by Terry O'Neill
