= Meuli =

Meuli is a surname. Notable people with this surname include:

- Daniela Meuli (born 1981), Swiss snowboarder
- Denzil Meuli (1926–2019), New Zealand priest
- Judith Meuli (1938–2007), American feminist, activist, and scientist
- Ted Meuli (1926–2007), New Zealand cricket player
