= Erin Matson =

Erin Matson may refer to:

- Erin Matson (writer) (born 1980), American writer and feminist activist
- Erin Matson (field hockey) (born 2000), American field hockey player
