= ICSW =

ICSW can stand for:

- Institute for Clinical Social Work, an independent educational institution in Chicago, Illinois
- Interdepartmental Committee on the Status of Women, a US government agency established in 1963
- International Committee on Seafarers Welfare (1973–2013), an organization now merged into the International Seafarers' Welfare and Assistance Network
- Inverse Compliance Score Weighting, a method of reweighting associated with the Local average treatment effect
- International Council on Social Welfare, an international organization
- Iowa Commission on the Status of Women
