= Catherine Conroy =

American trade unionist and feminist

Catherine Conroy (November 27, 1919 – February 19, 1989) was an American trade unionist and feminist.

== Early life ==
Conroy was born on November 27, 1919, at Misericodia Hospital in Milwaukee, Wisconsin. She was adopted as an infant by James and Amelia Conroy into a family of eleven children, although she was not told that she was adopted until she was an adult. Her father was an art dealer who specialized in paintings and antiques and her mother was an employee at a millinery shop and worked in child care. Conroy grew up on the west side of Milwaukee, although the family struggled with money during the Great Depression as her father's business was not doing well and he refused to go on welfare. The family moved within the city several times, and she attended eight different schools. She was not a good student and instead focused on playing baseball and basketball. She graduated from West Division High School in 1938 but chose not to continue to university, as she was not dedicated to further study and her parents were unable to afford it.

== Career ==
After graduation, with the support of a family friend, Conroy was hired by the kitchen at a tuberculosis sanitorium and then spent four years working at County General Hospital in the cafeteria and the diet kitchen. She was frustrated by the treatment of student nurses that she witnessed, as they were often demeaned and terrorized by more senior staff. She asked about the establishment of a union for the kitchen staff as the chefs had their own union, but she didn't push the issue. When more jobs became available as a result of World War II, she began working as an operator for the long distance office of Wisconsin Bell in 1942 with her parents' encouragement. She was not invested in the work and transferred to the training division after a year. She was also irritated by the company's attempts to control every aspect of their employees' lives, as there was an expectation for how staff were to dress, act and vote.

=== Union work ===
Conroy asked about a union at Bell and learned that there was an operators' union, although it was set up by the company as an association of employees rather than a forum for advocacy and met infrequently. At that time, the craftsmen union was looking for more members to create a truly independent union and Conroy became involved with the cause. The group gathered signatures, succeeded in calling an election governed by the National Labor Relations Board and created a new union as part of the Wisconsin Telephone Guild. Conroy helped write the by-laws and became a steward for the union at her local office. The Wisconsin Telephone Guild was represented by the National Federation of Telephone Workers (NFTW) and when negotiations with Bell broke down in 1947, Conroy became a picket captain of the national six week strike by telephone workers. The strike made clear the need to restructure the NFTW, as it operated through the smaller chapters but without a central enforcement system.

In 1949, the new telephone workers union, the Communications Workers of America (CWA), received its charter. Conroy was given more responsibility, becoming a business agent for operating and clerical forces in Milwaukee. She had been given three years leave from her position with Bell in 1947 to work for the union and in 1950, she chose to leave Bell and stay with the union. She was elected as the president of the Local 5500 (later renamed to the Local 4600), holding the position between 1951 and 1960. While in the role, she filed grievances primarily on behalf of the telephone operators and began to realize that the mistreatment her members faced was part of a larger practice of gender discrimination in the Bell System.

=== Women's rights activism ===
Inspired by her experience representing female telephone operators, Conroy became involved with women's rights activism in the 1960s. She joined the Commission on the Status of Women created by the Governor of Wisconsin in 1963 as the representative for labor, a group chaired by Kathryn Clarenbach. The commission worked on issues such as pay equity, domestic violence and marital property. She attended the Conference on the State Commissions on the Status of Women in June 1966 in Washington D.C., where the Department of Labor blocked the state commissions from adopting resolutions. She was invited by Clarenbach that evening to a meeting in Betty Friedan's hotel room where the National Organization for Women (NOW) was founded, and was present at lunch the following day to begin the planning process. Conroy asked each of the women present to donate $5 to create the organization's treasury.

She founded the Chicago chapter of NOW in 1968, while in the city through her position with the CWA, and was the first president. She helped to organize the chapter's sit-ins at grilles which only allowed male customers and the 1970 Women's Strike Day. In 1974, she attended the convention to found the Coalition of Labor Union Women (CLUW) in Chicago and set up a Milwaukee chapter of the organization, serving as its first president. She was appointed by President Jimmy Carter to his Advisory Committee on Women later in the decade.

Conroy became frustrated with how few women held leadership positions at the CWA and she ran twice to be vice president. She lost both elections and was told during her campaigns that a woman would not be able to handle the role. In 1974, she successfully ran for the executive board of the Wisconsin State AFL-CIO and became the first woman on the board. Around this time, she was passed over for a position as CWA state director and appealed to the president of the organization that it was due to sex discrimination. He defended the decision and she ultimately filed a sex discrimination complaint with the Department of Industry, Labor and Human Relations and the Equal Employment Opportunity Commission (EEOC). Her complaint remained unresolved until she retired from the CWA in 1982 and was offered a monetary settlement.

She was involved in a settlement with Wisconsin Bell, representing women who were denied maternity benefits. She sent letters to the union locals notifying them of the potential class action lawsuit and the required forms to participate in the claim, with more than a hundred complaints being filed. The lawsuit lasted a year before the company agreed to pay four to six weeks' wages and benefits to the plaintiffs.

== Later life and legacy ==
Conroy retired in 1982 but continued to be actively involved in a variety of organizations. She joined the Wisconsin Women's Network, a partnership of women's groups that had taken the role of the defunct Commission on the Status of Women, the board of the Department of Natural Resources and the University of Wisconsin Board of Regents. She petitioned for the University of Wisconsin to introduce a graduate program in nursing, campaigned for local Democratic candidates and supported young women in trade unions. She died of cancer on February 19, 1989, at the age of 69.

Friedan, in an interview with The Milwaukee Journal, described Conroy as "one of our heroines".

== Awards and honors ==
In 1985, the Wisconsin Women's Network honored Conroy for her work in women's issues and labor.

The Catherine Conroy Award is presented to a woman in Wisconsin who works on improving the rights of women and labor.
