= Judith Meuli =

American feminist activist and scientist (1938–2007)

- Born: January 15, 1938; Chippewa Falls, Wisconsin, US
- Died: December 14, 2007 (aged 69)

Judith Meuli (January 15, 1938 – December 14, 2007) was an American feminist, activist and scientist.

== Early life and education ==
Judith Meuli was born in 1938 to parents Isabel Meuli (née Dresel) and Earle Meuli in Chippewa Falls, Wisconsin. Her siblings are Yvonne Herbert (née Meuli), Allan R. Meuli, Dr. Earle Maile and Gerald R. Meuli. In 1963, she earned a Bachelor of Science degree from the University of Minnesota. For the next 10 years, she was a research scientist there, and then at the University of California, Los Angeles, where she studied renal physiology. Although she taught surgical techniques and research methods at the university, Meuli was discouraged from entering medical school by her peers due to her sex as well as her age.

== Work in women's empowerment ==
=== Work with National Organization for Women ===
Meuli joined the National Organization for Women (NOW) in 1967. She helped to found the Los Angeles chapter of NOW, and served as secretary from 1968–1970. She was the co-editor of NOW Acts (NOW's national newsletter) from 1970 to 1973, co-editor of the National NOW Times (the national newspaper) from 1977 to 1985, and editor of Financing the Revolution in 1973. Meuli was a member of NOW's national board of directors from 1971 to 1977 and the chair of the National Membership Committee from 1971 to 1974, on the National Nominating Committee in 1974, and co-ordinator of the Hollywood chapter of NOW in 1976. She was president of Los Angeles NOW from 1998 to 2000. She also co-edited the National NOW publication Do it NOW with her partner Toni Carabillo, as well as creating a line of feminist jewelry to raise money for NOW and the Equal Rights Amendment campaign.

=== Books ===
The Feminization of Power was published in 1988, co-written with her partner Carabillo. The book originated with a traveling exhibit that they created for a campaign tour intended to motivate women to run for office that year.

The Feminist Chronicles, 1953–1993 (1993) was written with Carabillo and June Csida.

=== Women's Heritage Corporation ===
In 1969, she co-founded a publishing company for feminist literature, such as paperback biographies of individuals like Elizabeth Cady Stanton and Lucy Stone. This company, the Women's Heritage Corporation, also produced a calendar and almanac.

=== Women's Graphic Communications ===
In 1970, Meuli created a graphic arts firm with Carabillo. She designed many graphic images for T-shirts, buttons, etc., most famously one that combines the symbol for women with the "equals" sign across the circle called the "Brassy", one of which was given to Pope Paul VI by Betty Friedan in 1973. She also made designs to promote the Older Women's League, the Equal Rights Amendment and many other issues and events.

=== The Feminist Majority Foundation ===
In 1987, Feminist Majority (now known as Feminist Majority Foundation) was founded by Meuli, Eleanor Smeal, arabillo, Peg Yorkin and Katherine Spillar to "encourage women to become involved in public affairs and [the] electoral process". She was secretary and board member. In 1990, she designed and constructed a building to host their media center and archives.

The Feminist Majority Foundation publishes Ms. magazine and ran a national clinic access project, which trained members on how to defend against anti-abortion extremists. It also led campaigns to pass the Freedom of Access to Clinic Entrances (FACE) Act, as well as the Violence Against Women Act (VAWA).

=== Other involvement in women's rights organizations ===
She also designed the Veteran Feminists of America pin and medal of honor, and was a member of its national board. She was awarded its Trailblazer Award in 2006.

in 1977, Meuli became an associate of the Women's Institute for Freedom of the Press (WIFP), an American non-profit publishing organization which works to increase communication between women and to connect the public with forms of women-based media.

She is featured in Who's Who in America, Who's Who in American Women and Feminists Who Changed America.

== Death and legacy ==
Meuli died December 14, 2007, at age 69 of multiple myeloma at her San Fernando Valley home in California. She donated her archive collections to the Schlesinger Library at Harvard Radcliffe Institute in Massachusetts. Her archives can also be found in Harvard and UCLA's digital collections.
