= Pamela Merritt =

Pamela Merritt is an American writer and reproductive justice activist who advocates for women's rights and against white supremacy. Merritt is the executive director at Medical Students for Choice (MSFC), a 501(c)(3) non-profit organization with a network of over 10,000 medical students and residents around the world.

Prior to joining MSFC, Merritt co-founded and served with Erin Matson as co-director at Reproaction, a reproductive justice organization that works to increase access to abortion, expose deceptive practices at pregnancy crisis centers, and improve infant and maternal death rates. Merritt advocates for recruiting and training more doulas and midwives to improve birth mortality rates. She has published thousands of articles on racism and gender, and been featured on several national websites for her activism and expertise, including on the Washington Post, NPR, Rolling Stone, Vox, and the Huffington Post.

Merritt regularly receives violent sexual threats in response to her work, and is harassed extensively online on social media. She says she routinely reports the most threatening incidents to the police, and was once warned by the FBI about a white supremacist actively trying to find her home address, forcing her to change her online habits.

Merritt is a member of the Guttmacher Institute board of directors, the Leadership Council of Our Bodies Ourselves Today, and is the Honorary Chair of the Reproaction Advisory Council. She has spoken out strongly against Donald Trump. She grew up in St. Louis, Missouri, and before becoming an activist worked for a St. Louis newspaper.

Merritt attended Bard College at Simon's Rock and Brandeis University, where she studied anthropology and women's studies.
