= RightRides =

American nonprofit organization

RightRides for Women's Safety was a 501(c)(3) nonprofit organization that served four boroughs in New York City, offering late-night rides home for women and LGBT individuals. The RightRides program began in 2004 and ceased operation around September 2013.

== History ==
Oraia Reid and Consuelo Ruybal, the founders of RightRides, learned of an increasing number of sexual assaults on women walking home by themselves late at night in Williamsburg and Greenpoint, two North Brooklyn neighborhoods. They then started RightRides for Women's Safety as a community-based response in 2004. It was a free rideshare program.

Using their own car, the pair began offering cisgender and transgender women a free ride home on Saturday nights.

Initially, RightRides operated in three neighborhoods—Williamsburg, Greenpoint, and the Lower East Side. However, a vehicle sponsorship with Zipcar in 2006 enabled RightRides to expand the program significantly by enlisting community members to volunteer to operate the donated vehicles and implementing a dispatch system to coordinate the cars. At the peak of its operation, RightRides served 45 neighborhoods in Manhattan, Brooklyn, Queens, and the Bronx every Friday and Saturday night from 11:59 p.m. to 3:00 a.m. transporting anyone who identified as LGBT+ or a woman safely home.

Each volunteer driving team was composed of a driver and a navigator, and at least one member of each team identified as a woman. All volunteers were required to pass a criminal background check. Driving teams were required to wait outside for their riders to enter their residence in order to ensure their safety.

In 2009, RightRides co-founded New Yorkers for Safe Transit, a coalition in New York City working to end gender-based discrimination, harassment, and assault in the city’s mass transit system. This community organizing effort came as a result of teaming up with Manhattan Borough President Scott Stringer to produce Hidden in Plain Sight: Sexual Harassment and Assault in the New York City Subway System, a report on the frequency of gender-based violence in the city’s mass transit system. The report found that 63% of respondents reported having been sexually harassed and 10% had been sexually assaulted in the New York City Subway system. In 2009, Oraia Reid testified at a joint New York City Council hearing called by Committees on Women's Issues, Public Safety, and Transportation to discuss subway safety. In 2010, Mandy Van Deven testified on behalf of RightRides at the first-ever New York City Council hearing on street harassment, called by Council Member Julissa Ferreras and covered by over 200 media outlets worldwide.

The RightRides service ceased operation around September 2013. In an update posted to the RightRides official website, executive director Radha Patel wrote: "RRWS’ Board have concluded that for the longer sustainability of the organization and the RR program, we have decided to suspend the RightRides program and our community organizing work, resulting in the layoffs of our Program Manager and community organizer, effective this month. While difficult, this decision allows time for us to assess and review our operations model, its effectiveness, and overall sustainability, as well as a greater focus on building a stronger funding base. We are committed to revising our programs for better service to women and the LGBT*Q community."

== Awards and recognition ==
For its grassroots efforts, RightRides won several awards, including a Proclamation from the New York City Mayor's Office announcing December 12, 2005, as "RightRides For Women's Safety Day," presented by New York City Human Rights Commissioner Patricia Gatling. In February 2006, RightRides received the Susan B. Anthony Award for excellence in furthering women's equality from the New York City chapter of the National Organization for Women. In March 2006, New York City Council Member Diana Reyna presented RightRides with the annual Pacesetter Award for capturing the spirit of New York City through their volunteer efforts. In 2007, Oraia Reid and Consuelo Ruybal were named New Yorkers of the Week by NY1. In 2010, Oraia Reid was named by Metro News as an NYC Local Hero and was also recognized by the National Association for Female Executives as a Woman of Excellence for her service to NYC.
