= Katherine Spillar =

American editor and activist

Kathy Spillar
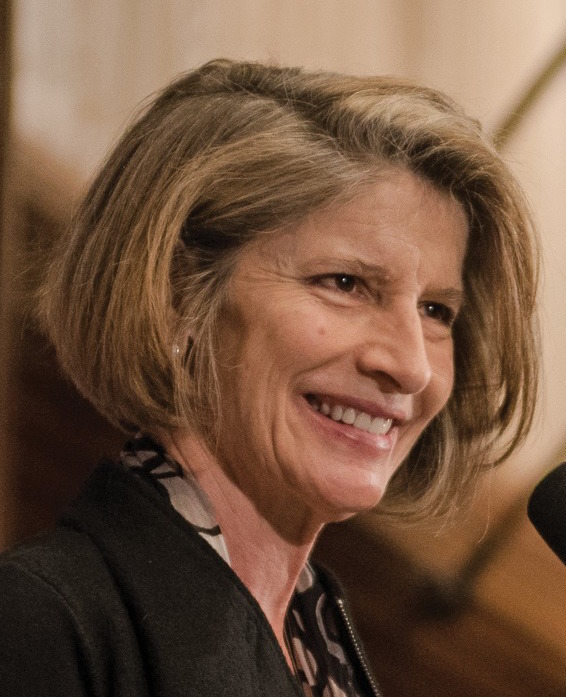
- Education: Texas Christian University (BA); Trinity University, Texas (MA)

Katherine Spillar is the American executive editor of Ms. and co-founder and executive director of the Feminist Majority Foundation (FMF) and the Feminist Majority.

== Early life ==
Katherine Spillar grew up in Texas. Her mother, Edna Hughes, was a nurse who used her GI benefits to attend college and then medical school. She met Spillar's father, Bliss Spillar, while they were studying for medical school together and the two moved to San Antonio.

== Education ==
Spillar graduated magna cum laude from Texas Christian University (TCU) in three years with a degree in urban studies. She holds a Master of Science interdisciplinary degree in economics and urban studies from Trinity University.

== Political activism ==
When asked when she had become a feminist, Spillar told an interviewer, "I think I was born a feminist," although she later added that she probably discovered the term "feminism" during her undergraduate years at TCU. After the bid to ratify the Equal Rights Amendment failed on June 30, 1982, Spillar became active in the feminist movement. In 1983, she served as president of the National Organization for Women Los Angeles, then the largest chapter in the nation. During the four terms of her presidency, Spillar made progress on a number of fronts. An expert in anti-abortion violence, Spillar created a system for defending abortion clinics in Los Angeles and Orange County, inspiring thousands of volunteers to escort women safely past protestors. And in the wake of the beating of motorist Rodney King, she worked to establish the National Center for Women and Policing.

In 1992, under Spillar and Dolores Huerta's leadership, the Feminist Majority Foundation launched its Feminization of Power campaign, intended to inspire women to run for political office.

Spillar became executive editor of Ms. Magazine in 2005 and oversaw the creation of the Ms. Magazine blog, the expansion of international reporting, and the Ms. in the Classroom program, a digital platform that provides access to the magazine for college campuses around the world.
