= Faith Seidenberg =

American lawyer (1923–2015)

- Born: Faith Lenore April; October 21, 1923; Manhattan, New York City
- Died: January 16, 2015 (aged 91); Fayetteville, New York
- Education: Juridical Doctor
- Alma mater: Syracuse Law School
- Occupation: Attorney
- Spouse: Robert Seidenberg

Faith Seidenberg (October 21, 1923 – January 16, 2015) was an attorney and civil rights activist who was best known for having entered the male-only establishment McSorley's Old Ale House in Manhattan with fellow attorney Karen DeCrow on August 10, 1969. When refused service, they sued and won a landmark ruling barring discrimination in public places on the basis of sex.

== Early life ==
She was born Faith Lenore April in Manhattan on October 21, 1923. She attended Calhoun School in New York and then Syracuse University. In her senior year at Syracuse, she became engaged to Robert Seidenberg, and they wed in 1944. She later attended Syracuse Law School, graduating in 1954 as one of only two women in the class.

== Legal and activist career ==
She started her career in Syracuse as a public defender. There she represented the rights of minors to have legal representation when appearing in court.

In 1963, she was invited by attorney William Kunstler to become one of a group of volunteer lawyers defending civil rights workers on the voter registration drive in the southern United States. She spent two summers in Mississippi and Louisiana, following which she became an attorney for the Congress of Racial Equality (CORE). She also defended Bruce Dancis, a draft-card burner at Cornell University, during the time of the Vietnam War.

Seidenberg also worked on issues of women's rights. She was at one point a national vice president for the National Organization for Women. In 1992, she took on a Title IX case involving the women's ice hockey team at Colgate University. This was the first case to convert a university's women's athletic club to a varsity team under the Title IX law and was considered a landmark case for the law.

She was on the Executive Board of the American Civil Liberties Union, where she established the Women’s Legal Defense Fund of the ACLU.

She is best known, though, for her landmark legal case against McSorley's Old Ale House. In 1969, she and Karen DeCrow entered the all-male establishment, and were refused service. They sued for discrimination. The case decision made the front page of The New York Times on June 26, 1970. The suit, Seidenberg v. McSorleys' Old Ale House (1970, United States District Court, S. D. New York) established that, as a public place, the ale house could not violate the Equal Protection Clause of the United States Constitution.

Her papers covering the time that she served as vice president of the National Organization for Women, are held at the Harvard Library.

== Private life ==
Her husband, Robert Seidenberg, was a psychiatrist. He served as president of the Greater Syracuse chapter of NOW. He died in 2010. They had three daughters, named Laurie, Dana, and Lisa.
