= Marguerite Rawalt =

American lawyer

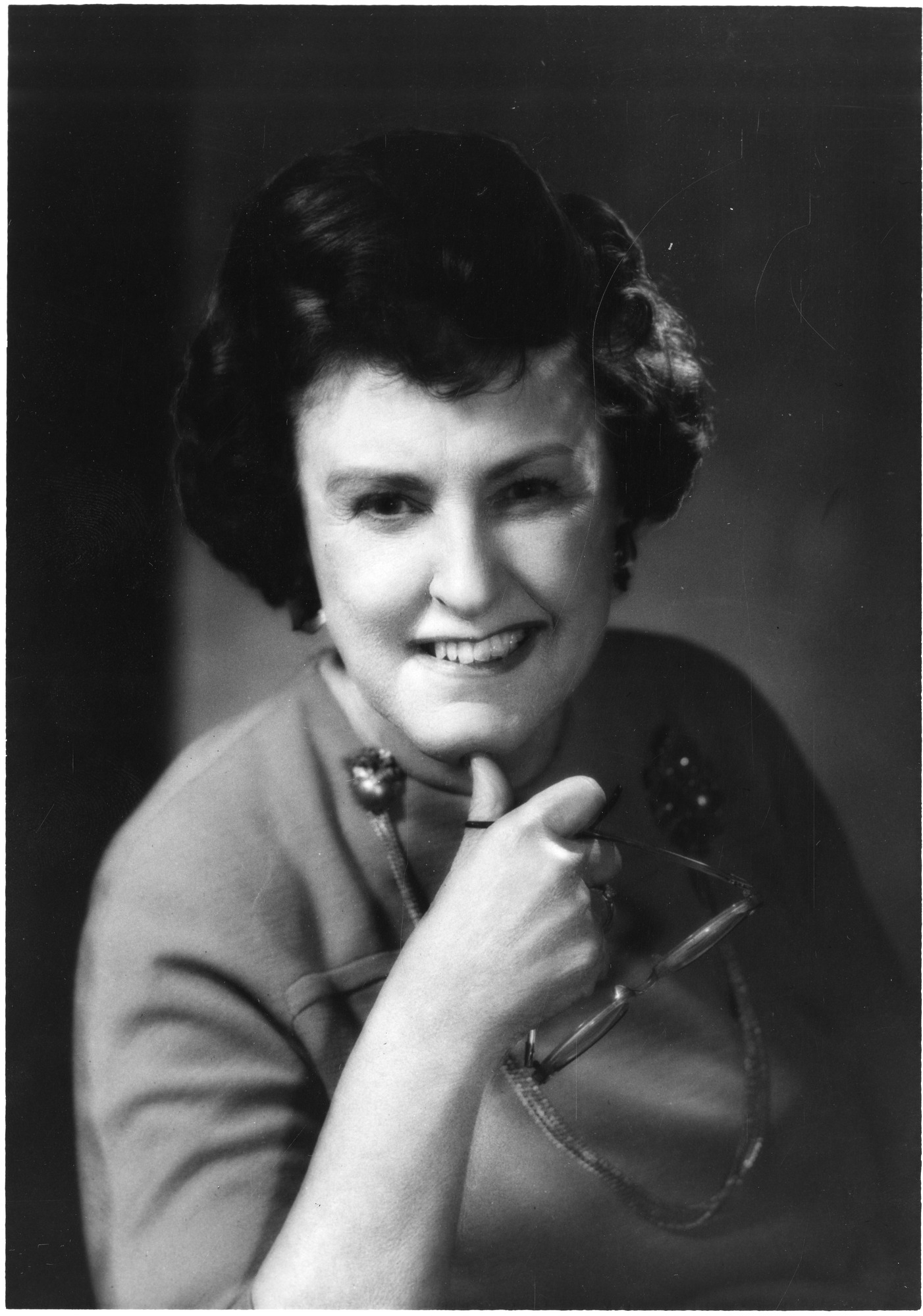
- Born: 16 October 1895
- Died: 16 December 1989 (aged 94)

Dr. Marguerite Rawalt (16 October 1895 – 16 December 1989) was an American writer and lawyer who lobbied in Congress on behalf of women's rights. She worked for the Internal Revenue Service for 30 years, and served on the board of directors for numerous interest groups relating to women's rights issues. Rawalt was a member of the National Presbyterian Church.

== Early life ==
Rawalt was the oldest of three children, and was born in Prairie City, Illinois. Her family eventually moved to Corpus, Christi, Texas and settled there. She attended the University of Texas in Austin for one year, then taught high school math in Lorena, Texas. While teaching, Rawalt “befriended and admired the female superintendent of schools.” When this superintendent, Lucy Moore, resigned to go to law school in San Antonio, Rawalt became superintendent, however she left a year later to join Moore in San Antonio to attend business school. While in San Antonio, she met Jack Tinsdale, a handsome, piano-playing master sergeant whom she found sweet, attentive, but also vulnerable. The two married in 1918. Additionally, in 1918, Rawalt went to work in the Quartermaster Corps Office in Fort Sam Houston beginning her career in civil service. In 1921, the couple moved to Austin, so Jack could attend the University of Texas. At this time, Lucy Moore worked at the University of Texas Law Library, and she helped Rawalt get a job in Governor Pat Neff’s office, where she quickly impressed Neff. Eventually, Rawalt wrote official resolutions for Neff and delivered messages to the state legislature for the governor. However, the governor was against Rawalt’s dream of a legal career, as she was a woman. Jack Tinsdale, failing his classes and upset with Rawalt’s long hours with male co-workers, decided to move to El Paso, opening a franchise of a women’s lingerie company. However, six months later, Jack abandoned this franchise and moved to the North in search of a new job. Rawalt remained in San Antonio, working as the secretary of a car dealership, and she soon organized the dealership's finances. Tinsdale and Rawalt divorced in 1927.

In 1928, Rawalt received a telegram from Neff, who had been recently appointed to the U.S. Board of Mediation, stating, “‘COME TO WASHINGTON AS MY SECRETARY. ATTEND FIRST-RATE LAW SCHOOL AT NIGHT.’” Marguerite accepted Neff’s offer, and moved to Washington D.C.. Rawalt desired to attend Georgetown Law, however these plans were soon halted when coworkers informed her that Georgetown does not accept women. Rawalt attended George Washington Law instead, and she graduated as a member of the Order of the Coif and as an editor of the initial volume of GW's law review. However, when she was first invited to be an editor, her first reaction was to seek out the faculty advisor and ask why she had been singled out for extra work, not yet recognizing the honor of the invitation. She also joined the Kappa Beta Pi Legal Sorority at George Washington Law, making friends and contacts with other women lawyers. Rawalt took and passed the bar exam in 1932, a year before graduating in June 1933, so that she could start job hunting as soon as the Franklin Roosevelt administration began in March.

== A Career Fighting for Women's Issues and Law ==
In December, 1933, Rawalt received a job in the Office of the Chief Counsel, Bureau of Internal Revenue. Upon beginning work, she was told she would be assigned as docket clerk, but she insisted she had been hired as a lawyer, and thus should be given cases like the other lawyers. Rawalt soon joined the Women’s Bar Association of the District of Columbia, an organization founded by suffragettes fighting for the Equal Rights Amendment (ERA). This sparked her interest in the Equal Rights Amendment. Additionally, she joined the National Association of Women's Lawyers, and, in 1935, she joined the Federal Bar Association, an almost all-male national organization of government lawyers. She also joined the D.C. Business and Professional Women’s Club, and the National Woman’s Party. In 1937, she married Harry Secord, an attorney with the U. S. War Department, but the couple kept the marriage secret for three years because the federal government prohibited employment of more than one family member. In 1938, Rawalt was assigned to the Appeals Division, sharing an office with two men who would often give her the most difficult cases. Furthermore, she joined the D.C. Bar Association when women were admitted in 1941. Rawalt served as president of the National Association of Women Lawyers from 1942 to 1943 and was elected the first woman president of the Federal Bar Association (FBA) in May 1943. Rawalt remained the only woman president of the FBA until 1993. Furthermore, in 1943, Rawalt became the first woman delegate in the American Bar Association’s House of Delegates. During these years, the United States was in the midst of World War II, and Rawalt’s husband served as a major in the U.S. Army Air Forces. In 1954, Rawalt served as President of the National Federation of Business and Professional Women’s Clubs, and she also began the tax-exempt Business and Professional Women’s Foundation, a center for research on women, a resource for scholarships, a resource for history of women and women's organizations, and a resource for policymakers, scholars and others. In 1961, Rawalt served on President John F. Kennedy’s Commission on the Status of Women, which was chaired by Eleanor Roosevelt. After the assassination of Kennedy, President Lyndon Johnson appointed her to the Citizens Advisory Council on the Status of Women, and she also served on the District of Columbia Commission on the Status of Women. Rawalt used these positions as a platform to advocate for the passage of the Equal Rights Amendment.

In July, 1963, her husband died and was buried in Arlington National Cemetery. In 1964, Marguerite Rawalt wrote to members of Business and Professional Women and Zonta International, asking them to lobby for the passage of provision VII of the Civil Rights Act of 1964, which prohibited discrimination by employers on the basis of sex. Rawalt continued working on the IRS’s legal staff until 1965 when, at the age of seventy and after thirty-one years at the agency, she retired. In 1966, Rawalt became a member of the National Organization for Women, and acted as their first legal counsel. During her retirement, Rawalt continued to play an active role in the second-wave feminist movement, advising the legal arm of the National Organization of Women and picketing the White House with NOW in 1969. She also continued to practice law, but limited her practice to actions involving women's legal rights. Rawalt also dedicated herself to working as a volunteer in many women's organizations and on many women's causes and projects, seeking to improve the status of women in our country and open doors of opportunity to women.

Notably, Rawalt continued her fight for the passage of the Equal Rights Amendment throughout her retirement. She worked continuously toward the passage of the Equal Rights Amendment by Congress on March 22, 1972, and when that did not pass, she began working towards ratification. “Rawalt advocated for the ratification of the Equal Rights Amendment through the National Organization of Women and the Women’s Equity Action League as well as Women United, the ERA Ratification Council, and ERAmerica. In 1975, she attended the International Women’s Year Conference in Mexico City, and she helped plan the National Women’s Conference in Houston, Texas, in 1977. After the ratification of the Equal Rights Amendment by the states in 1882 proved unsuccessful, she wrote an article captioned, “ERA SHALL RISE AGAIN,” published in Women Lawyers Journal, writing, “The ERA is not dead. Failure of ratification by the necessary three additional legislatures before the deadline of June 30, 1982, has aroused a battle cry of indignation and determination which makes failure impossible the next time around. And there will be a next time.” Marguerite Rawalt returned to Corpus Christi, dying in 1989, at the age of ninety-four.

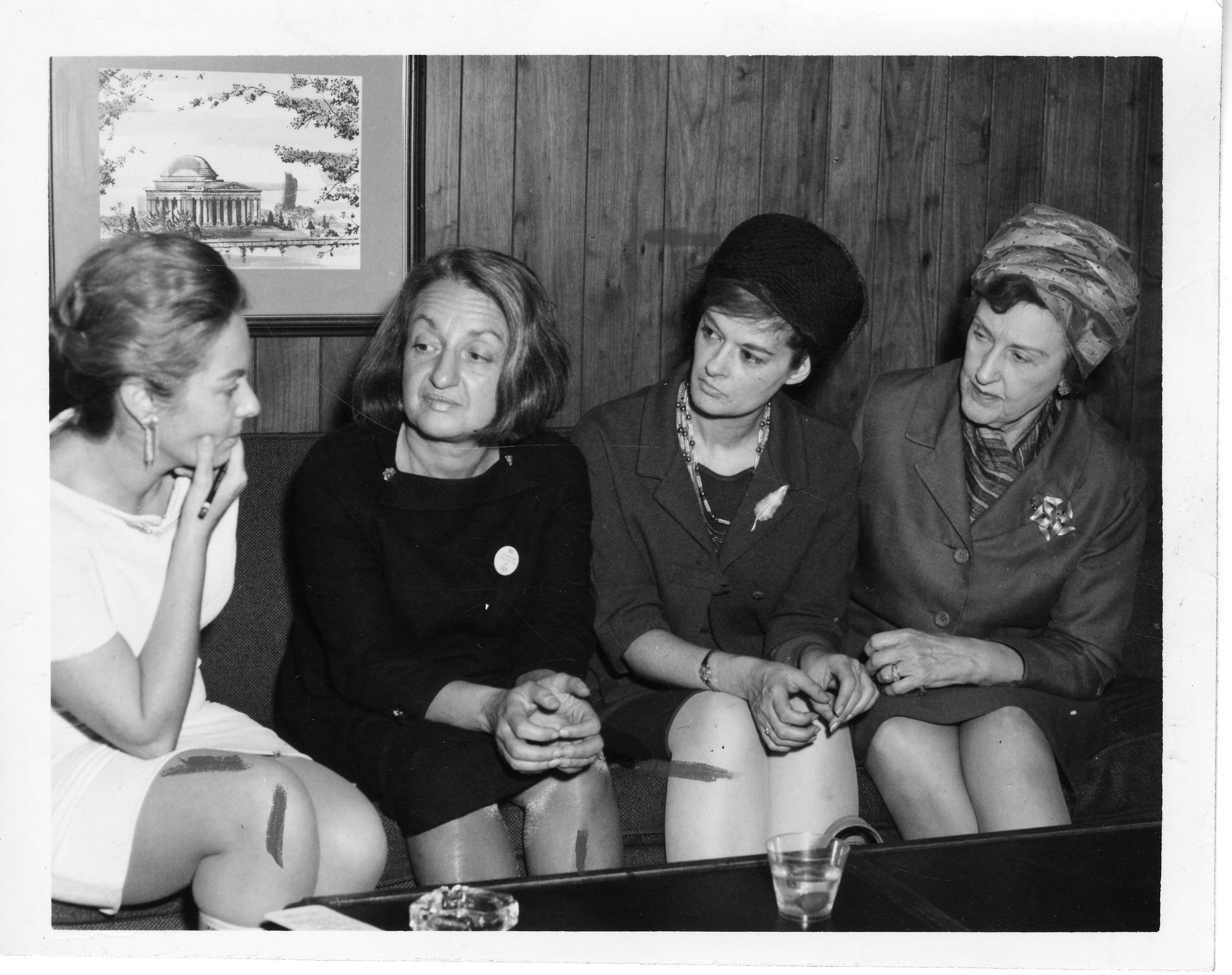
Unknown woman, Betty Naomi Goldstein Friedan, Barbara Ireton, Marguerite Rawalt

== See also ==
- National Organization for Women (NOW)
- Women's rights
