= Rebecca Talbot Perkins =

American businesswoman and activist

- Born: Rebecca Clarendon Talbot; February 14, 1866; Brooklyn, New York
- Died: November 1, 1956 (aged 90); Brooklyn, New York
- Occupations: Businessperson, philanthropist, activist
- Known for: Founding Talbot Perkins Children's Services
- Spouse: Agar Ludlow Perkins (m. 1895)

Rebecca Talbot Perkins (née Talbot; February 14, 1866 – November 1, 1956) was an American businessperson, philanthropist, and activist from Brooklyn, New York. She was the founder of Talbot Perkins Children's Services. She was inducted into the National Women's Hall of Fame in 2009.

== Early years ==
Perkins was born Rebecca Clarendon Talbot in Brooklyn, the daughter of Joseph Talbot and the former Eliza Clarendon.

== Career and education ==
She attended what is now known as the Chautauqua Institution and continued to work there for ten years after graduating.

Joseph Talbot founded a real estate brokerage but died of influenza just a few years later, in 1890. Rebecca, still unmarried, took over the business at a time when it was rare for a woman to be in business at all, let alone running a firm.

Even while running the brokerage, she maintained an active involvement in charity and social activism. At various times, she led, among other organizations, the Alliance of Women's Clubs of Brooklyn, the People's Political League of Kings County, the Memorial Hospital for Women and Children, and the Welcome Home for Girls. In 1927, she founded (with the Alliance) The Rebecca Talbot Perkins Adoption Society, which later became Talbot Perkins Children's Services.

== Personal life ==
She married Agar Ludlow Perkins on September 5, 1895.
