= Catherine Shipe East =

American researcher and feminist

- Born: May 15, 1916; Barboursville, West Virginia
- Died: August 17, 1996 (aged 80); Ithaca, New York
- Occupation(s): Researcher, feminist
- Spouse: Charles East (m. 1937)

Catherine Shipe East (May 15, 1916 – August 17, 1996) was a U.S. government researcher and feminist referred to as "the midwife to the women's movement". She was a powerful force behind the founding of the National Organization for Women (NOW) and held several influential federal government positions throughout her career.

== Early life ==
Catherine Shipe East was born on May 15, 1916, in Barboursville, West Virginia to Bertha Woody and Ulysses Grant Shipe. She was the oldest of three children. Her mother suffered a nervous breakdown when Catherine was eleven years old, and four years later her father committed suicide. Considering teaching her only option at the time, she entered teaching school at Marshall College, but had to withdraw due to financial difficulties' eleven credit short of getting her bachelor's degree.

She married Charles East in 1937, whom she subsequently divorced; they had two daughters. In 1939 took a position with the U.S Civil Service Commission as a clerk. She earned her bachelor's degree in 1943.

== Role in Government ==
Catherine Shipe East began her career as a junior civil service examiner with the U.S Civil Service Commission in 1939. She advanced to become the chief of the career service division before going to work for the Department of Labor in 1963. She served as the technical adviser to the President's Commission on the Status of Women and participated in the research and writing of the commission's report, American Women, published in 1963. After the release of this report, President John F. Kennedy created the Interdepartmental Committee on the Status of Women and the Citizen's Advisory Council on the Status of Women, appointing East to serve as executive secretary for both groups.

== National Organization for Women ==
Through her position as a government insider, Catherine East served as a foundational conduit of information for feminists across the nation. She believed that women needed a powerful organization similar to the NAACP. She encouraged Betty Friedan, who referred to her as "the midwife to the women's movement, and other women in her circle to create the National Organization for Women, in order to have an organization that could function outside of the government to create change in government policies.

Catherine East was part of NOW's first Legal Committee, along with Mary Eastwood, Phineas Indritz, and Caruthers Berger.

== Activism and awards ==
After retiring from government service in 1977, East became a full-time activist, working to pass the Equal Rights Amendment in Virginia and nationally and serving as women's issues coordinator in the John Anderson Presidential campaign (Nov. 1979 - Nov. 1980) and as legislative director of the National Women's Political Caucus (Oct. 1983 - Dec. 1986). She served on the board of the National Organization for Women's Legal Defense and Education Fund from 1979 to 1983.

She took part in a study of how newspapers handled various women's issues and co-authored a report called "New Directions for News." She was an active member of numerous organizations, such as the American Association of University Women, American Civil Liberties Union, League of Women Voters, National Woman's Party, and Planned Parenthood. She also received numerous awards, including WEAL's Elizabeth Boyer Award in 1983 for her "outstanding contribution to the advancement of women," and the Veteran Feminists of America Medal of Honor in 1993. She was inducted into the National Women's Hall of Fame in 1994. A longtime resident of Arlington, Va., East moved to Ithaca, N.Y., in early 1996 to be near her youngest daughter. She died on August 17, 1996, in Ithaca, New York.
