= Barbara Iglewski =

American microbiologist (1938–2023)

Barbara Hotham Iglewski (March 23, 1938 – December 10, 2023) was an American microbiologist. She was director of international programs at the University of Rochester Medical Center where she was a professor of microbiology and immunology.

== Early life and education ==
Barbara Hotham Iglewski was born on March 23, 1938, in Freeport, Pennsylvania. Her father was a country physician and she would accompany him on house calls during her youth. She attended Allegheny College, earning a B.S. in biology in 1960. She then studied microbiology at Pennsylvania State University, earning her M.S. in 1962 and her Ph.D. in 1964.

Iglewski instructed at Oregon Health and Science University School of Medicine before she was hired as a professor by the University of Rochester Medical Center. She was the first woman to chair a department at the University of Rochester School of Medicine and Dentistry, heading the department of microbiology and immunology from 1986 to 2009. From 1995 to 1998 she was the vice provost for research and graduate education, and the first female to hold this position.

== Research ==
Iglewski's research centered on the pathogenesis of the Pseudomonas aeruginosa bacterium. She discovered that a type I quorum sensing system globally regulated virulence in a human pathogen. She discovered exoenzymes and toxins including exo S, a type 3 secreted Pseudomonas toxin. She was well known for describing the molecular mechanism of action of Pseudomonas toxin A.

Her work with Peter Greenberg demonstrated that gram-negative bacteria produce AHL signals that control processes such as biofilm formation in neighbouring cells of the same species.

From 2007, she studied the regulation of proteases in Pseudomonas aeruginosa, with a focus on biofilm development and virulence, with the support of a MERIT Award from the NIH.

Iglewski published more than 150 research papers and book chapters. She held seven patents. She was recognized by the Institute for Scientific Information as a highly cited researcher.

== Awards and honors ==
In 1987, Iglewski was made an Honorary Lifetime Member of Graduate Women in Science, formerly Sigma Delta Epsilon, for research in microbiology and immunology.

Iglewski became a fellow of the American Academy of Microbiology in 1986. She was president of the American Society for Microbiology (ASM) from 1987 to 1988. She chaired ASM's publications board from 1990 to 1999.

Iglewski received the Arthur Kornberg Research Award in 1999 and the Susan B. Anthony Lifetime Achievement Award in 2001. The University of Rochester's School of Medicine and Dentistry awarded her its Lifetime Mentoring Award in 2009. Her undergraduate alma mater, Alleghany College awarded her an honorary degree in 2017. She received the George Eastman Medal from the University of Rochester in 2019.

Iglewski was inducted into the National Women's Hall of Fame in 2015.

== Personal life and death ==
Iglewski lived in Gorham, New York. She had two sons, Eric (Connie) Iglewski and Bill Iglewski.

Barbara Iglewski died on December 10, 2023, at the age of 85.
