= Susan Kelly-Dreiss =

American activist

Susan Kelly-Driess
- Born: 1942 (age 83–84); Pennsylvania, U.S.
- Occupations: Founder and Executive Director of the Pennsylvania Coalition Against Domestic Violence for over 30 years.
- Known for: Helped pass the Pennsylvania Protection from Abuse Act, that state's first domestic violence law. Inducted into the National Women's Hall of Fame in 2009.

Susan Kelly-Dreiss (born 1942) is an American women's rights and anti-violence activist. She co-founded and served as the first Executive Director of the Pennsylvania Coalition Against Domestic Violence (PCADV). She helped pass the Pennsylvania Protection from Abuse Act, that state's first domestic violence law.

== Life and career ==
Kelly-Dreiss was born in Pennsylvania. She attended Carlow College and West Virginia University. She served on the Pennsylvania Commission on Crime and Delinquency and was a founding member of the National Network to End Domestic Violence. She was inducted into the National Women's Hall of Fame in 2009.

Susan Kelly-Dreiss worked on behalf of battered women and their children for over thirty years. She started her career by helping to open a shelter for battered women in Harrisburg, Pennsylvania. Then in 1976, she joined with other women to successfully lobby for passage of Pennsylvania's first domestic violence law, the Pennsylvania Protection from Abuse Act. During this time, there was little to no law to protect battered women due to the wake of Roe v. Wade, Title IX, and the ongoing fight for the Equal Rights Amendment.

She was the co-founder of the first domestic violence coalition in the United States, the Pennsylvania Coalition Against Domestic Violence (PCADV). Her inspiration behind starting the PCADV came from growing up in a battered home herself. As the Executive Director of PCADV, Kelly-Dreiss oversaw the growth of the network from nine to sixty-one community-based programs throughout the state of Pennsylvanian. In 1993, she was instrumental in securing federal funding to establish the National Resource Center on Domestic Violence at PCADV, which provides information and technical assistance on domestic violence and related issues.

She played a key role in drafting federal legislation including the Federal Violence Prevention and Services Act and the Violence Against Women Act. In her testimony to the United States Senate, she strongly advocated for the action of the Violence Against Women Act by defining domestic violence, the equal treatment of women, and her urgency to help all American women who are victims. She served in leadership positions on family violence task forces under two Pennsylvania attorneys general, and was appointed by Governor Tom Ridge and re-appointed by Governor Ed Rendell to the Pennsylvania Commission on Crime and Delinquency.

Susan Kelly-Dreiss was the recipient of a National Crime Victim Service Award and mentored and motivated women to carry out the work of the Battered Women's Movement. PCADV and its member organizations have provided life-saving services to more than 1.5 million domestic violence victims and their children to date.
