= Gloria Yerkovich =

American victims' rights activist (born 1942)

Gloria Jean Yerkovich (born 1942) is an American victims' rights activist who founded Child Find of America to prevent and resolve child abductions and missing children cases. Yerkovich is a 1993 inductee into the National Women's Hall of Fame for her work.

== Life and career ==
Yerkovich was living in New Paltz, New York, when her 5-year-old daughter Joanna was abducted by the girl's father, Franklin Pierce, on December 20, 1974. Pierce took the girl to Europe, and Yerkovich spent nearly ten years trying to find her daughter. She and her daughter were reunited in 1984. In 1989 Yerkovich sued Pierce.

Child Find was a prototype for the National Center for Missing and Exploited Children, and the awareness raised by Yerkovich and other activists led to the 1982 Omnibus Victims Protection Act and the Missing Children Act. Yerkovich attended the signing of the latter at the invitation of President Ronald Reagan.
