= Erin Matson (writer) =

American writer and activist

Erin Matson (born 1980) is an American writer and feminist activist. Matson was 23 when she became the youngest-ever state chapter president in the history of the National Organization for Women (NOW). In June 2009, she was elected Action Vice President of NOW. She is a co-director of the activist organization Reproaction with Pamela Merritt.

Matson is a native of Minneapolis, Minnesota. In 2002 she graduated from Georgetown University with a degree in Women's Studies.

Matson was elected as part of a four-member team called "Feminist Leadership NOW" that took office July 21, 2009. Members of the team included Terry O'Neill of as President, Bonnie Grabenhofer of Illinois as executive vice president, and Allendra Letsome as membership vice president.

Matson was NOW's Prairie States Regional Director before taking national office and served on National NOW's Board of Directors for three years. During this time, she traveled to Iowa to participate in NOW PAC's campaign to elect Hillary Clinton president of the United States.

To date, Matson has served as the longest standing member of the National NOW Young Feminist Task Force (2003-2008). She co-authored a resolution that created the 2006 Young Feminist Summit in Albany, N.Y., and also authored and passed a bylaws amendment to incorporate virtual chapters in the organization.

Matson was also the youngest-ever President of a state chapter when she was elected to lead Minnesota NOW in 2004.

Matson has said that her personal experience as an anorexia survivor led her to feminist activism. Recently she has spoken out against Ralph Lauren's extreme digital retouching of model Filippa Hamilton. “Certainly apologies are due to her personally,” Matson told Radar Online. “But what I’m really concerned about here is the message that that this has sent to millions of pre-teens, daughters, mothers, sisters – women around the country and the world."

Matson left her position at National NOW in 2012. In 2015, she and Pamela Merritt co-founded Reproaction, a direct action group formed to increase access to abortion and advance reproductive justice. She also serves on the board of directors of NARAL Pro-Choice Virginia.
