= Terry O'Neill (feminist) =

American feminist, lawyer and professor

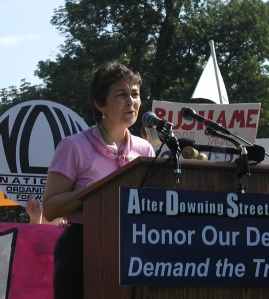
- O'Neill speaking in 2005
- Born: c. 1953 (age 72–73)
- Education: Northwestern University (BA) Tulane University Law School (JD)
- Occupation: President of National Organization for Women
- Known for: Law professor at Tulane University Law School, Membership vice president of National Organization for Women

Terry O'Neill (born c. 1953) is an American feminist, civil rights attorney, and professor. She was the president of the National Organization for Women (NOW) from 2009 to 2017, as well as president of the NOW Foundation and chair of the NOW Political Action Committees.

== Education ==
O'Neill graduated from Rosemary Hall (now Choate Rosemary Hall), and holds a bachelor's degree in French with distinction from Northwestern University and a J.D. degree magna cum laude from the Tulane University Law School.

== Career ==
O'Neill got began her career in politics in the early 1990s when David Duke ran for governor of Louisiana. At the time, she was a professor of law at Tulane University in New Orleans. She signed on with the Stop Duke Campaign and contributed by petitioning door-to-door against him. The following year she joined NOW.

She served as NOW's vice president for membership from 2001 to 2005. She taught feminist legal theory and international women's rights law, corporate law and legal ethics at Tulane and the UC Davis School of Law. She is a past president of Louisiana NOW, Maryland NOW and New Orleans NOW and member of the National Racial Diversity Committee. She served on the NOW National Board, representing the Mid-South Region (2000–2001) and the Mid-Atlantic Region (2007–2009).

=== NOW election ===
O'Neill was elected as part of a four-member team called "Feminist Leadership NOW" that took office July 21, 2009. Bonnie Grabenhofer of Illinois is executive vice president, Erin Matson from Minnesota became action vice president, and Allendra Letsome of Maryland became membership vice president. O'Neill resigned from her position as chief of staff to Councilwoman Duchy Trachtenberg of Montgomery County, Maryland in June 2009, to work full-time for NOW. The election was very close—won by eight votes, with outgoing president Kim Gandy supporting the other team led by Latifa Lyles, a 33-year-old African American who emphasized youth, diversity and new technology.

=== Political platform ===
The Washington Post said she "campaigned to reenergize what she called an outsider strategy of 'tapping into energy and outrage' felt by grass-roots feminists across the country over 'the ground we lost' during the Bush administration".

NOW addresses are abortion rights, reproductive rights issues, violence against women, constitutional equality, promoting diversity, ending racism, LGBT rights, and economic justice.

She was strongly critical of the Stupak-Pitts Amendment, which attempted to place limits on taxpayer-funding of abortions (except in the cases of rape, incest, and life of the mother) in the context of the November 2009 Affordable Care Act. The amendment was ultimately not included in the bill.

O'Neill has said the struggle against transphobia is a feminist issue.

== Personal life ==
O'Neill has one daughter. According to O'Neill, she left her first husband following a physical domestic dispute when she was 22 years old, then moving to reside with her parents in New Orleans. She later divorced from her second husband.

== Notes ==
| Preceded by Kim Gandy | President of the National Organization for Women; 2009–2017 | Succeeded by Toni Van Pelt |
