= Louise McManus =

American nurse and educator (1896–1993)

- Born: 1896
- Died: May 29, 1993 (aged 96–97); Natick, Massachusetts
- Education: Teachers College, Columbia University
- Occupation: Nurse

(Rachel) Louise McManus (1896 – May 29, 1993) was the first nurse to earn a Ph.D. She established schools of nursing in college and helped to develop nationally standardized methods for nursing licensure in the United States.

== Education ==
Louise McManus earned her nursing degree at the Massachusetts General Hospital School of Nursing in 1921. She completed bachelor's (1925), master's (1927) and doctoral (1946) degrees at Columbia University's Teachers College, where she earned a PhD in educational research, becoming the first nurse to acquire a PhD.

== Achievements ==
McManus created the Institute for Nursing Research at Teachers College, Columbia University, where she later served as faculty member and dean. McManus saw herself as an advocate for patients and developed a "Patient Bill of Rights" that was adopted by the Joint Commission in Accreditation of Hospitals. She also served on the Defense Advisory Committee on Women in the Armed Services.

== Awards and honors ==
- Columbia University Bicentennial Award
- Florence Nightingale International Red Cross Society Citation and Medal
- Mary Adelaide Nutting Award for Leadership
- 1994: Inductee, National Women's Hall of Fame

In recognition of her contributions to the field of nursing, the National Council of State Boards of Nursing established the R. Louise McManus Award and the Meritorious Service Award. The R. Louise Mcmanus Medal was established to recognize distinguished long-standing contributions to the field of nursing.

The Library at the Center for Nursing at the Foundation of New York State Nurses was dedicated in her honor with an endowment by the Nursing Education Alumni Association of Teachers College (TCNEAA).

== Personal life ==
She was born Rachel Louise Metcalfe in 1896. She was a native of North Smithfield, R. I. In 1929, she married a widower named John Hugh McManus who had four daughters and two sons. Together they had a daughter, Joan, bringing the total number of children to seven. One of her stepsons was George Boles McManus, who became a senior administrator at the Central Intelligence Agency. Her husband died suddenly in 1934.

== Death ==
Louise McManus died on May 29, 1993, in a Natick, Massachusetts, nursing home at age 97.
