= Judy Goldsmith =

- Born: Judith Ann Becker; November 26, 1938 (age 87); Manitowoc, Wisconsin
- Education: University of Wisconsin–Stevens Point; State University of New York at Buffalo
- Occupations: Academic, feminism activist, dean

Judy Goldsmith (born November 26, 1938) is an American feminist, academic, and activist. She served as president of the National Organization for Women (NOW) from 1982 to 1985, which is the largest feminist organization in the United States; prior to this she was an English professor. Goldsmith also serves as an honorary board member of the Veteran Feminists of America, whose headquarters are in Phoenix, Arizona.

== Early childhood and education ==
Judith Ann Becker was born in November 26, 1938, in Manitowoc, Wisconsin. Her father did not provide for the family and leaving her mother and five siblings to take care of themselves. After her parents divorced, her mother worked in a factory for twenty-five years to support the family, while only having an 8th grade education. The Beckers grew up very poor and for a time lived in a re-converted chicken coop with no running water and an old wooden stove. After completing high school in 1957, Becker received a scholarship that provided the funds to attend the University of Wisconsin–Stevens Point. Becker was originally a music major singing and playing the piano, however she was passionate about literature and language so she graduated with a bachelor's degree in English. As a student at the University of Wisconsin-Stevens Point, Judy Becker met and married Dick Goldsmith and later had a daughter named Rachel. Judy Goldsmith also received a master's degree from the State University of New York at Buffalo.

== National Organization for Women ==
=== Career ===
When Judy went into the job market in 1950, there were numerous ads for men and minimal for women, putting women at a significant disadvantage for employment opportunities. The ads, described by Judy, were geared towards women that read: "Needed: Attractive, Woman, Receptionist" for example.

Goldsmith began her career as a college English professor at the University of Wisconsin and then became involved in NOW shortly thereafter. She and her sister became involved in NOW together in 1974, after being invited by a friend to attend. After a few months of being involved, Judy was elected president of the Manitowoc County chapter in Wisconsin, which went on to become the first statewide NOW organization. Judy played a large role in the development of the state chapter and was later elected to be president of the state chapter. Fifteen years later she became a national leader of NOW and moved to Washington, D.C.

In 1982, while Goldsmith was head of NOW, the organization succeeded in increasing the number of women serving in state legislatures. Goldsmith advocated a more partisan direction for the formerly more inclusive NOW and adopted liberal positions on issues such as Reaganomics. During the same year, NOW controversially endorsed Frank Lautenberg, the male Democratic Senate opponent of New Jersey's Republican feminist Congresswoman, Millicent Fenwick, due to Fenwick's support of Reagan's economic agenda despite her pro-women's rights stances. Lautenberg defeated Fenwick by a narrow margin. Goldsmith believed that much discrimination had roots in economics and survival issues. During her tenure she also worked with Coretta Scott-King on the 1983 march commemorating the 20th anniversary of the historic "March on Washington" by Martin Luther King Jr.

=== Smeal v Goldsmith ===
Eleanor Smeal was Judy Goldsmith's predecessor as NOW president as well as her mentor. Smeal supported Goldsmith during the 1982 election, partly because Smeal was not eligible for reelection herself. Smeal unofficially backed Goldsmith's entire slate, the goal being to endorse and hopefully continue Smeal's policies. An article from 1982 in the Washington Post credits Goldsmith's win "as an affirmation of the policies that built NOW into the nation's foremost voice on women's rights, despite the group's inability last year (1981) to win ratification of the Equal Rights Amendment" under Smeal's lead. Two others from Goldsmith's slate, Alice Chapman and Mary Jean Collins, were elected both with Smeal's unofficial backing. However, the other positions within the organization were not all filled by the slate that Goldsmith headed, which therefore made it unclear how the voting delegates felt about Smeal's past leadership, as the executive vice president was won by an independent, attorney Barbara Timmer, who pledged a wider, more activist approach than Smeal's, and the secretary position was won by Kathy Webb, who was also an independent.

As Goldsmith's presidency continued, the original support she had from Smeal appeared to slip away, as rumors and speculations surfaced that Smeal was going to run for the presidency again. When Smeal announced she was running in the 1985 election, she said that it was due to her belief that Goldsmith was too moderate and did not focus on the issues that were important to herself. Goldsmith often met with politicians, and felt that progress could only be made when women were elected into political positions. On the issues of abortion and equal rights, Goldsmith said, "It is on our agenda but it is not the most propitious time to bring it up. We are not interested in exercises in futility. We must change the political landscape and get more women elected before we try again". Smeal, however, said that there "was a wish that NOW become more outspoken, assertive and publicly active on a number of issues," and that she favored a national program for direct action now. "This can't wait for another 10 years," she said. "We can't decide that we want it and then do nothing". Goldsmith said, in defense of her methods, that "Loud may be good, but it is not only the level of decibels that is heard". Their methods were seen as very different and is what led to the intense battle for the presidency. For example, the two leaders approached anti-abortion terrorism in different ways. Goldsmith sent a telegram to President Reagan, demanding an investigation, and then later called on President Reagan, when she received no response, by telling reporters how she felt during a White House pickett. Smeal, however, led the first March for Women's Lives in 1986, which drew over 150,000 people to Washington and Los Angeles in support of women's reproductive rights. Goldsmith believed in accomplishing NOW's goals through politics while Smeal felt rallies, demonstrations, and protests were the better method, illustrated when Smeal said "It's time to go back on the streets, go on the campuses and show we're the majority" in 1985.

The 1985 election was heated and intense but Smeal won over Goldsmith. Goldsmith was the incumbent seeking her second term, and NOW presidents had traditionally served two consecutive two-year terms. Members of NOW's 35-member national board and its state coordinators supported Goldsmith by a 2 to 1 margin, and she appeared to have more supporters at the convention's plenary sessions. It was reported by the SunSentinal in the 1985 article Smeal Wins Battle For Top NOW Post, "the factors contributing to Mrs. Smeal's victory were personality differences between the two candidates, a faulty sample ballot, the last-minute decision by a NOW officer to endorse Mrs. Smeal, a legal vote-brokering system, and a surprisingly vitriolic final campaign speech by Mrs. Goldsmith". Before the election Goldsmith, was believed to be leading, yet Smeal defeated Goldsmith by the margin of 839 to 703. Goldsmith's final campaign speech may have been what cost her votes, many said, in which she "uncharacteristically attacked her opponent in hard-hitting language, had lost her some votes. She accused Mrs. Smeal of, among other things, 'duplicity, character assassination and a ward-boss political mentality". It was also reported in Smeal Wins Battle For Top NOW Post, that Goldsmith seemed to be trying at the last minute to reverse her image as a president who preferred coalition-building to one who might be comfortable with her opponent's combative style. Overall the 1985 election between Goldsmith and not only her predecessor, but her mentor as well proved to be "one of the most heated presidential elections in the [then] 19-year history of the National Organization for Women".

== Retirement and legacy ==
After her tenure as President of NOW she served in various leadership positions, including Dean of the University of Wisconsin–Fond du Lac, retiring in 2002, though she remains active. Today, the University awards the "Judy Goldsmith Young Woman Leadership Award" in her honor. While using her musical background, Judy now plays piano at a nursing home in Fond du Lac and ballroom dances as frequently as possible.

| Preceded by Eleanor Smeal | President of the National Organization for Women; 1982 - 1985 | Succeeded by Eleanor Smeal |
