= Patricia Ireland =

American feminist

Patricia Ireland (born October 19, 1945) is an American administrator and feminist. She served as president of the National Organization for Women from 1991 to 2001 and published an autobiography, What Women Want, in 1996.

== Early life and education ==
Ireland was born on October 19, 1945, in Oak Park, Illinois. Her parents were James Ireland, a metallurgical engineer, and Joan Filipek, a volunteer counselor at Planned Parenthood. She grew up in Valparaiso, Indiana, and graduated from Valparaiso High School at the age of sixteen in 1962. She began studying at DePauw University and married Don Anderson, a student at Ball State University, and the couple transferred to the University of Tennessee. Following a divorce from her first husband, Ireland received her bachelor's degree from the university in 1966. She received a J.D. degree from the University of Miami School of Law in 1975. She also attended Florida State University College of Law.

== Career ==
Before beginning a career as an attorney, Ireland worked as a flight attendant for Pan Am. After discovering gender-based discrepancies in the treatment of insurance coverage for spouses of employees, Ireland fought successfully for a change in coverage. Knowing that ignorance of the law was a disadvantage, she immediately began law school and performing volunteer work for the National Organization for Women (NOW). She moved to Washington, DC, as an elected officer of NOW. Ireland advocated extensively for the rights of poor women, gays and lesbians, and African-American women. She has also advocated electing female candidates, and training people to defend clinics from anti-abortion protesters around the United States. Ireland became the president of NOW in 1991. She ran for re-election in 1993, winning with 671 votes against Efia Nwangaza, who received 235 votes.

Immediately following Ireland's appointment to president of NOW, questions arose about her sexual orientation. On December 17, 1991, she gave an interview with The Advocate, in which she states that she had a female companion while remaining married to her second husband. She published a book, What Women Want, in 1996.

In 2003, Ireland served for six months as the CEO of the YWCA. In October 2003, she was dismissed after refusing to step down, although YWCA spokespeople denied that conservative pressure was a factor in the decision. Following her dismissal from the YWCA, Ireland was former Senator Carol Moseley Braun's national campaign manager for her brief 2004 presidential bid.

Ireland returned to Miami and resumed practicing law, representing unions and their members until her retirement in 2023.

Non-profit organization positions
Preceded by Molly Yard	President of the National Organization for Women; 1991–2001	Succeeded by Kim Gandy
