= National Women's Hall of Fame =

American institution created in 1969

Coordinates: 42°54′33″N 76°47′58″W

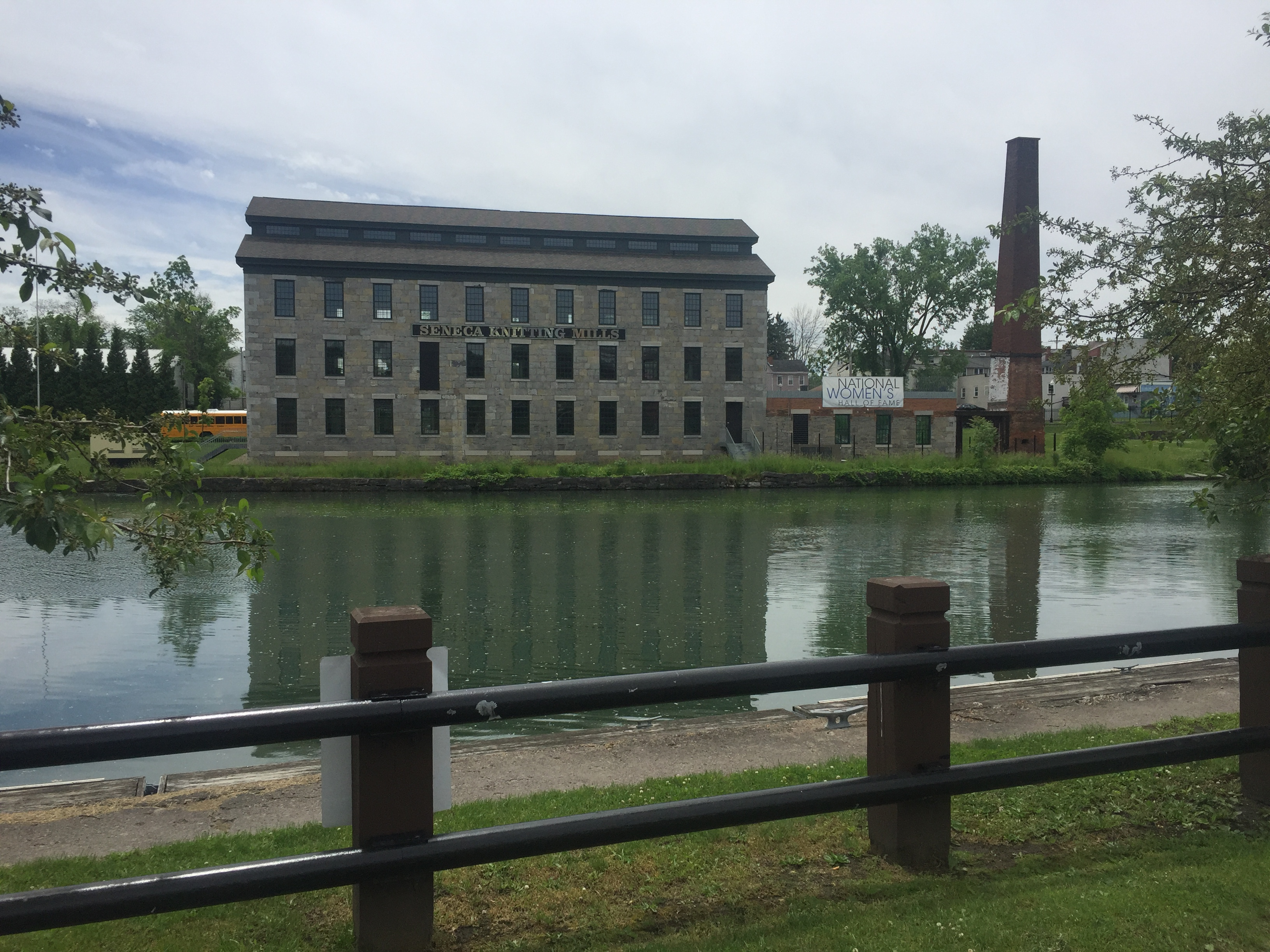
NWHF from across river, in 2022

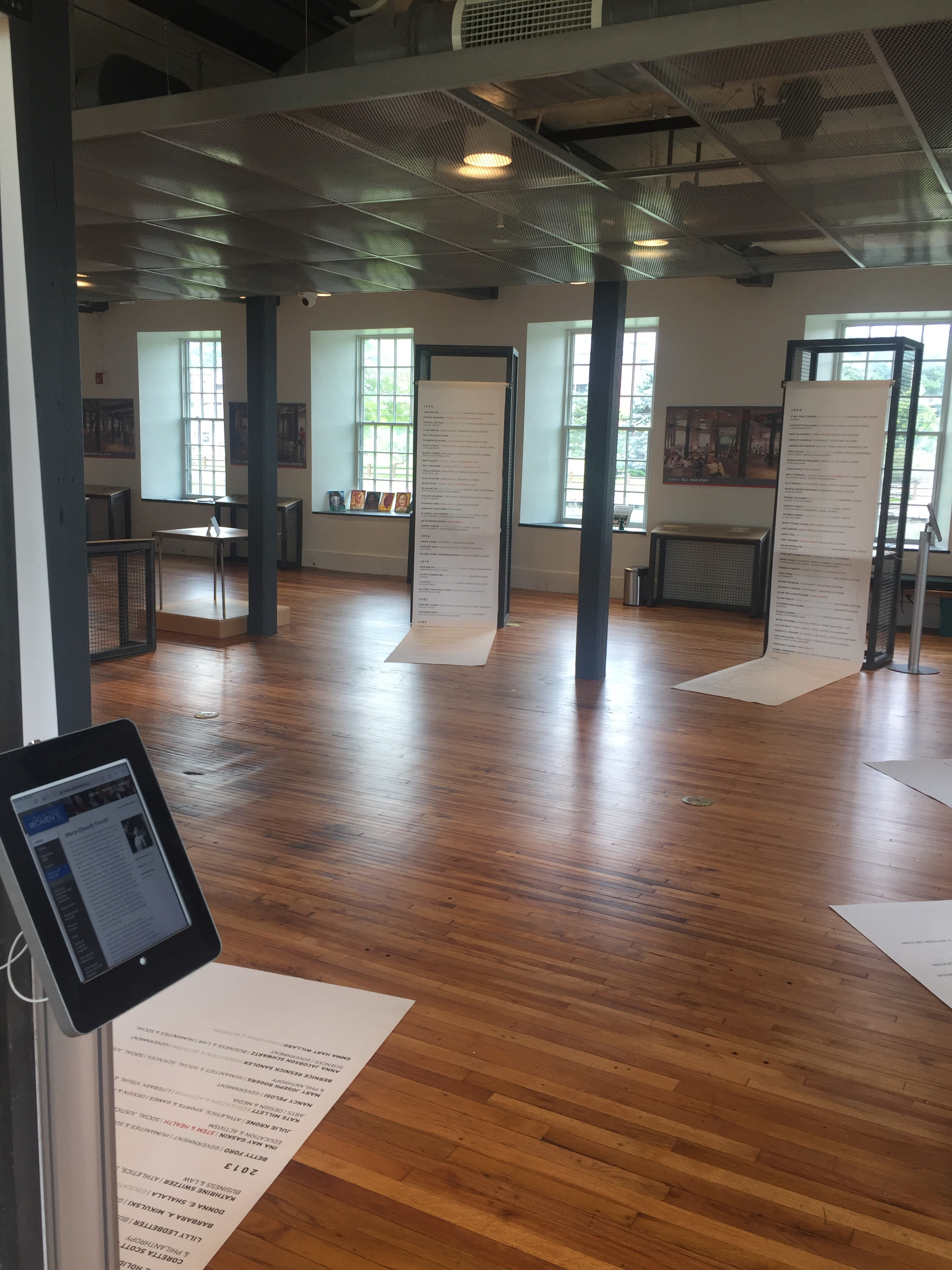
Interior of NWHF, in historic mill, in 2022

The National Women's Hall of Fame (NWHF) is an American institution founded to honor and recognize the accomplishments of women. It is located in Seneca Falls, New York, the site of the famous Seneca Falls Convention of 1868. The Hall was incorporated in 1969, and first inducted honorees in 1973. As of 2024, the NWHF has honored 312 inductees.

Inductees are nominated by members of the public and selected by a panel of judges on the basis of the changes attributed to the honoree, that affect the social, economic or cultural aspects of society; the significant national or global impact; as well as, the enduring value of their achievements. Induction ceremonies are held every odd-numbered year in the fall, with the names of the women to be honored announced earlier in the spring, usually during March, Women's History Month. In 2024, Sandy Stone became the first openly transgender woman inducted into the National Women's Hall of Fame.

The NWHF is a private 501(c)(3) non-profit organization funded by philanthropy, admissions, and other income. In July 2021, Jennifer Gabriel was named executive director.

== Location ==
The National Women's Hall of Fame was hosted by Eisenhower College until 1979/1980, when the organization rented out a historic bank building in the Seneca Falls Historic District. The historic bank was renovated to house the NWHF's permanent exhibit, historical artifacts, and offices. In August 2020, the National Women's Hall of Fame opened its door to the third and final home: the historic Seneca Knitting Mill, which resides across the canal of the Women's Rights National Historical Park which includes the Wesleyan Chapel where the 1848 women's rights convention took place, an event that kickstarted the women's rights movement in America. This renovation and move into the historic Seneca Knitting Mill took several years to accomplish.

In 2014, the organization's board undertook a $20 million capital campaign to fund the development of the 1844 Seneca Knitting Mill, which is associated with the abolitionist movement and with the birthplace of women's rights. The move and completion of Phase 1 doubled the size of the National Women's Hall of Fame. As of 2021 campaigning for Phase 2: an elevator, additional staircase, and other renovations was underway. Once the Homecoming Campaign is complete, the historic Seneca Knitting Mill will quadruple the available space to 16,000 square feet (1,500 m^{2}), including exhibit space, offices, and meeting space for conferences, wedding receptions, and community events.

== Inductees ==
=== A–J ===
- Faye Glenn Abdellah, nursing pioneer
- Bella Abzug, politician
- Abigail Adams, former First Lady
- Jane Addams, activist and sociologist
- Madeleine Albright, former Secretary of State
- Tenley Albright, figure skater
- Louisa May Alcott, novelist and poet
- Florence E. Allen, first woman to serve of the Ohio Supreme Court
- Gloria Allred, attorney
- Linda Alvarado, construction executive
- Dorothy H. Andersen, researcher who named cystic fibrosis
- Marian Anderson, African-American contralto
- Ethel Percy Andrus, founder of the AARP
- Maya Angelou, poet and activist
- Susan B. Anthony, women's rights activist
- Virginia Apgar, physician who invented the Apgar score
- Ella Baker, civil rights activist
- Lucille Ball, actress
- Ann Bancroft, first woman to trek to the North Pole
- Clara Barton, founder of the American Red Cross
- Eleanor K. Baum, first female dean of a US engineering school
- Ruth Fulton Benedict, anthropologist and folklorist
- Mary McLeod Bethune, first Black woman to lead a federal agency
- Antoinette Blackwell, first female minister
- Elizabeth Blackwell, first woman to earn a MD in the United States
- Emily Blackwell, women's right's activist and the second woman to earn a MD in the United States
- Amelia Bloomer, temperance advocate and women's right's activist
- Nellie Bly, investigate journalist who circumnavigated the world
- Louise Bourgeois, artist
- Margaret Bourke-White, documentary photographer and photojournalist
- Lydia Moss Bradley, founder of the Bradley Polytechnic Institute
- Myra Bradwell, publisher and political activist
- Mary Carson Breckinridge, founder of the American FNS
- Ruby Bridges, civil rights activist
- Nancy Brinker, breast cancer research philanthropist and diplomat
- Gwendolyn Brooks, first African American to receive a Pulitzer Prize
- Pearl S. Buck, writer and humanitarian
- Betty Bumpers, politician
- Charlotte Bunch, feminist author and women's rights activist
- Octavia Butler, science and speculative fiction writer
- St. Frances Xavier Cabrini, first American saint
- Mary Steichen Calderone, physician and first female medical director of Planned Parenthood
- Annie Jump Cannon, astronomer and suffragist who helped develop stellar classification
- Rachel Carson, marine biologist and conservationist
- Eleanor Rosalynn Smith Carter, former first lady
- Mary Ann Shadd Cary, anti-slavery activist and the first black woman publisher in North America
- Mary Cassatt, impressionist painter and printmaker
- Willa Cather, Pulitzer winning writer
- Carrie Chapman Catt, social reformer and suffragist
- Judy Chicago, contemporary and feminist artist
- Julia Child, chef and author
- Lydia Maria Child, abolitionist and author
- Shirley Chisholm, first black woman to be elected to congress
- Hillary Clinton, politician and diplomat
- Jacqueline Cochran, aviator and businesswoman
- Mildred Cohn, biochemist specializing in chemical reactions within animal cells
- Bessie Coleman, first African-American woman and first Native American to hold a pilot license
- Eileen Collins, NASA astronaut and Air Force colonel
- Ruth Colvin, founder of ProLiteracy Worldwide
- Rita Rossi Colwell, microbiologist and founder of CosmosID
- Joan Ganz Cooney, writer and producer who co-founded Sesame Workshop
- Mother Marianne Cope, canonized saint
- Gerty Theresa Radnitz Cori, first woman to be awarded the Nobel Prize in Physiology or Medicine
- Jane Cunningham Croly, author and journalist
- Matilda Cuomo, former first lady of New York
- Angela Davis, political activist and scholar
- Paulina Kellogg Wright Davis, abolitionist and suffragist
- Dorothy Day, religious and social activist
- Marian de Forest, journalist and playwright
- Donna de Varona, former American 4x Olympic gold medalist in swimming
- Karen DeCrow, lawyer and feminist
- Sarah Deer, lawyer
- Emma Smith DeVoe, suffragist
- Emily Dickinson, poet
- Dorothea Dix, antebellum social-reformer
- Elizabeth Hanford Dole, politician
- Marjory Stoneman Douglas, journalist and conservationist
- St. Katharine Drexel, saint
- Anne Dallas Dudley, suffragist
- Mary Barret Dyer, Quaker martyr
- Amelia Earhart, pilot
- Sylvia A. Earle, marine biologist
- Catherine Shipe East, feminist, "the midwife to the women's movement"
- Crystal Eastman
- Mary Baker Eddy
- Marian Wright Edelman
- Gertrude Ederle
- Gertrude Belle Elion
- Dorothy Harrison Eustis
- Alice C. Evans
- Geraldine Ferraro
- Ella Fitzgerald, jazz singer
- Jane Fonda
- Betty Ford
- Loretta C. Ford
- Abby Kelley Foster
- Aretha Franklin, soul and R&B singer
- Helen Murray Free
- Betty Friedan
- Margaret Fuller
- Matilda Joslyn Gage
- Ina May Gaskin
- Althea Gibson
- Lillian Moller Gilbreth
- Charlotte Perkins Gilman
- Ruth Bader Ginsburg, lawyer and Supreme Court Associate Justice
- Maria Goeppert Mayer, theoretical physicist who contributed to the nuclear shell model
- Katharine Graham
- Martha Graham
- Temple Grandin
- Ella T. Grasso
- Marcia Greenberger
- Martha Wright Griffiths
- Sarah Grimké
- Angelina Emily Grimke Weld
- Mary Hallaren
- Rebecca S. Halstead
- Fannie Lou Hamer
- Alice Hamilton
- Mia Hamm
- Lorraine Hansberry
- Joy Harjo
- Martha Matilda Harper
- Patricia Roberts Harris
- Helen Hayes
- Dorothy Height
- Beatrice Hicks
- Barbara Hillary
- Oveta Culp Hobby, second woman to serve in the Cabinet
- Barbara Holdridge, recording executive
- Billie Holiday, singer
- Wilhelmina Cole Holladay, co-founder of the National Museum of Women in the Arts
- Jeanne Holm, first female Two-Star General in the United States
- Bertha Holt, adoption advocate
- Grace Murray Hopper, naval officer
- Julia Ward Howe, abolitionist
- Emily Howland, philanthropist who supported women's rights and the temperance movement
- Dolores Huerta, co-founder of the NFWA
- Helen LaKelly Hunt, activist and writer
- Swanee Hunt, former Ambassador to Austria
- Zora Neale Hurston, author and filmmaker
- Anne Hutchinson, early female preacher
- Barbara Iglewski, microbiologist
- Shirley Ann Jackson, physicist
- Victoria Jackson, cosmetics entrepreneur
- Mary Jacobi, first female pharmacist in the United States
- Frances Wisebart Jacobs, philanthropist who funded the founding of United Way
- Mae Jemison, astronaut and doctor
- Katherine Johnson, NASA mathematician
- Barbara Rose Johns, civil rights activist
- Mary Harris Jones, labor organizer
- Barbara Jordan, lawyer and educator

=== K–Z ===
- Helen Keller
- Leontine T. Kelly
- Susan Kelly-Dreiss
- Frances Oldham Kelsey
- Nannerl Keohane
- Jean Kilbourne
- Billie Jean King
- Coretta Scott King
- Julie Krone
- Elisabeth Kübler-Ross
- Maggie Kuhn
- Stephanie L. Kwolek
- Henrietta Lacks
- Susette La Flesche
- Winona LaDuke
- Carlotta Walls LaNier
- Dorothea Lange
- Sherry Lansing
- Allie B. Latimer
- Emma Lazarus
- Lilly Ledbetter
- Mildred Robbins Leet
- Maya Lin
- Anne Morrow Lindbergh
- Patricia Locke
- Belva Lockwood
- Juliette Gordon Low
- Clare Boothe Luce
- Shannon W. Lucid
- Mary Lyon
- Mary Mahoney
- Nicole Malachowski
- Wilma Mankiller
- Philippa Marrack
- Barbara McClintock
- Katharine Dexter McCormick
- Louise McManus
- Margaret Mead
- Barbara Mikulski
- Kate Millett
- Patsy Takemoto Mink
- Maria Mitchell
- Toni Morrison
- Constance Baker Motley
- Lucretia Mott
- Kate Mullany
- Aimee Mullins
- Carol Mutter
- Indra Nooyi
- Antonia Novello
- Sandra Day O'Connor
- Georgia O'Keeffe
- Rose O'Neill
- Annie Oakley
- Michelle Obama
- Rosa Parks
- Ruth Patrick
- Alice Paul
- Nancy Pelosi
- Mary Engle Pennington
- Frances Perkins
- Rebecca Talbot Perkins
- Esther Peterson
- Judith L. Pipher
- Jeannette Rankin
- Janet Reno
- Ellen Swallow Richards
- Linda Richards
- Sally Ride
- Rozanne L. Ridgway
- Edith Nourse Rogers
- Mary Joseph Rogers
- Eleanor Roosevelt
- Ernestine Louise Potowski Rose
- Sister Elaine Roulet
- Janet Rowley
- Wilma Rudolph
- Josephine St. Pierre Ruffin
- Mary Harriman Rumsey
- Florence Sabin
- Sacagawea
- Bernice Sandler
- Margaret Sanger
- Katherine Siva Saubel
- Betty Bone Schiess
- Ann Schonberger
- Patricia Schroeder
- Anna Schwartz
- Felice N. Schwartz
- Blanche Stuart Scott
- Florence B. Seibert
- Elizabeth Ann Seton
- Donna Shalala
- Anna Howard Shaw
- Catherine Filene Shouse
- Eunice Mary Kennedy Shriver
- Muriel Siebert
- Beverly Sills
- Louise Slaughter
- Eleanor Smeal
- Bessie Smith
- Margaret Chase Smith
- Sophia Smith
- Hannah Greenebaum Solomon
- Susan Solomon
- Sonia Sotomayor
- Laurie Spiegel
- Elizabeth Cady Stanton
- Gloria Steinem
- Helen Stephens
- Nettie Stevens
- Lucy Stone
- Kate Stoneman
- Harriet Beecher Stowe
- Harriet Williams Russell Strong
- Anne Sullivan
- Kathrine Switzer
- Henrietta Szold
- Mary Burnett Talbert
- Maria Tallchief
- Ida Tarbell
- Helen Brooke Taussig
- Mary Church Terrell
- Sojourner Truth
- Harriet Tubman
- Wilma Vaught
- Diane von Furstenberg
- Florence Schorske Wald
- Lillian Wald
- Madam C. J. Walker
- Mary Edwards Walker
- Emily Howell Warner
- Mercy Otis Warren
- Alice Waters
- Faye Wattleton
- Annie Dodge Wauneka
- Ida Wells-Barnett
- Eudora Welty
- Edith Wharton
- Sheila E. Widnall
- Emma Willard
- Frances Willard
- Serena Williams
- Oprah Winfrey
- Sarah Winnemucca
- Flossie Wong-Staal
- Victoria Woodhull
- Fanny Wright
- Martha Coffin Pelham Wright
- Chien-Shiung Wu
- Rosalyn Yalow
- Gloria Yerkovich
- Mildred "Babe" Didrikson Zaharias
