= Inez Casiano =

Inez Casiano (1926-2011) was a notable second wave feminist, a labor activist and a founding member of the National Organization for Women.

== National Organization for Women ==
Casiano was a founding member of the National Organization for Women, joining NOW in 1966. In 1967 she worked as a board member of NOW. According to historian Katherine Turk, she did not stay in this position for very long.

The Phoenix chapter of NOW is named in her honor.

== Work for the federal government ==
In the mid-1960s, Casiano worked on a project for the White House Committee on Children and Youth. Starting in 1967 she worked for the EEOC as an executive assistant to the executive director. In 1969, Casiano worked for the federal government in the Office of Policy Planning and Research. That year she approached President Richard Nixon directly to tell him she felt as though he had been ignoring the concerns of the Puerto Rican community.

== Education ==
Casiano graduated from the Community College of New York (CCNY) in 1960 with a B.B.A.

== Personal life ==
Casiano was born to Puerto Rican parents residing in Brooklyn, New York in 1926. In her late years she lived in Arizona. Casiano died in 2011.
