= Phineas Indritz =

American lawyer

Phineas Indritz (August 3, 1916 – October 15, 1997) was an American constitutional lawyer active in the civil rights movement.

== Personal ==
Indritz was born in Moline, Illinois, on August 3, 1916, and graduated from the University of Chicago with an AB in 1936 and a JD in 1938. He died October 15, 1997, in Silver Spring, Maryland.

== Hurd v. Hodge ==
Indritz is most well known for representing the plaintiff in Hurd v. Hodge in front of the Supreme Court in 1948, alongside Charles Hamilton Houston. The case, which was decided along with Shelley v. Kraemer, resulted in the court ruling that race-based restrictive property covenants were unconstitutional, a significant civil rights ruling six years before the Brown v. Board of Education case.

== Women's Rights Movement ==
Indritz was active in the American women's rights movement, and was a founding member of the National Organization for Women. He was part of NOW's first Legal Committee, along with Mary Eastwood, Catherine East, and Caruthers Berger.
