= Mary Eastwood =

American lawyer

Mary O. Eastwood
- Born: June 1, 1930
- Died: October 10, 2015 (aged 85)
- Education: University of Wisconsin
- Occupations: Lawyer, Civil rights advocate

Mary O. Eastwood (June 1, 1930 – October 10, 2015) was a pioneering American lawyer and civil rights advocate.

In 1955, Eastwood graduated from the University of Wisconsin Law School and then moved to Washington, D.C.

== Legal career ==
After graduating she worked on a temporary study project for the National Academy of Sciences. In 1960 she joined the Justice Department's Office of Legal Counsel, serving as an attorney advisor and later (1969–1979) as an equal opportunity advisor. In 1961, Eastwood became the associate special counsel for investigation in the special counsel's office of the Merit System Protection Board, which investigated allegations of illegal personnel practices in the federal government.

In 1965 Eastwood and Pauli Murray published the landmark article "Jane Crow and the Law: Sex Discrimination and Title VII", in the George Washington Law Review. The article discussed Title VII of the Civil Rights Act of 1964 as it applied to women, and drew comparisons between discriminatory laws against women and Jim Crow laws. In subsequent years, Ruth Bader Ginsburg successfully argued this point in the case Reed v. Reed in front of the Supreme Court.

== Feminism and advocacy work ==
In 1966, Eastwood was one of the 28 women who founded the National Organization for Women at the Third National Conference of Commissions on the Status of Women in June (the successor to the Presidential Commission on the Status of Women). She joined another 21 women and men who became founders at the October 1966 NOW Organizing Conference, for a total of 49 founders. Both conferences were held in Washington, D.C. The 28 women who became founders in June included Mary Eastwood. They were inspired by the failure of the Equal Employment Opportunity Commission to enforce Title VII of the Civil Rights Act of 1964; at the Third National Conference of State Commissions on the Status of Women they were prohibited from issuing a resolution that recommended the EEOC carry out its legal mandate to end sex discrimination in employment. They thus gathered in Betty Friedan’s hotel room to form a new organization. On a paper napkin Friedan scribbled the acronym "NOW". Eastwood was part of NOW's first Legal Committee, along with Catherine East, Phineas Indritz, and Caruthers Berger. NOW's picket of the Equal Employment Opportunity Commission in protest of their sex-segregated Help Wanted ads was organized at Eastwood's apartment, and a photo of her picketing was in the Washington Post the next day.

Eastwood was also a board member of Human Rights for Women (HRW), which was founded in 1968 to help finance sex discrimination litigation and research projects on women's issues, and a member of Federally Employed Women (FEW), which fought to end sex discrimination in the federal government. In 1977, Eastwood became an associate of the Women's Institute for Freedom of the Press (WIFP).

Some of Eastwood's papers are held in the Arthur and Elizabeth Schlesinger Library on the History of Women in America.
