= Karen DeCrow =

American lawyer & feminist (1937–2014)

- Born: Karen Lipschultz; December 18, 1937; Chicago, Illinois, U.S.
- Died: June 6, 2014 (aged 76); Jamesville, New York, U.S.
- Education: Northwestern University (B.A.); Syracuse University (J.D.)

Karen DeCrow (née Lipschultz; December 18, 1937 – June 6, 2014) was an American attorney, author, activist and feminist. She served as the fourth national president of the National Organization for Women (NOW) from 1974 to 1977. She was also a strong supporter of equal rights for men in child custody decisions, arguing for a "rebuttable presumption" of shared custody after divorce. She also asserted that men as well as women should be allowed the decision not to become a parent.

== Early life ==
Karen Lipschultz was born in Chicago, Illinois, to a Jewish family, on December 18, 1937. She was the oldest child of Samuel Meyer Lipschultz, a businessman, and Juliette Abt Lipschultz, a professional ballet dancer. She graduated from Sullivan High School in 1955 and received a bachelor's degree from the Medill School of Journalism at Northwestern University in 1959.

After graduating from college, she worked as a writer and editor for a number of magazines and publishing houses, including as a fashion editor at Golf Digest. She married Alexander Kolben in 1960 but they divorced five years later. She was remarried the same year, to Roger DeCrow, a computer scientist, and the couple moved to Syracuse, New York.

== Career and activism ==
DeCrow joined the National Organization for Women (NOW) in 1967, after she and her female coworkers at a publishing house realized they were earning less than men. She was a co-founder of the Syracuse chapter of NOW and became president in 1968. In 1969, she ran for mayor of the city of Syracuse, becoming the first female mayoral candidate in the history of New York.

The same year, she and Faith Seidenberg entered the all-male establishment McSorley's Old Ale House and were refused service. They sued for discrimination. The case decision made the front page of The New York Times on June 26, 1970. The suit, Seidenberg v. McSorleys' Old Ale House (S.D.N.Y. 1970) established that, as a public place, the ale house had violated the Equal Protection Clause of the United States Constitution.

=== Legal career ===
After entering law school, she earned her Juris Doctor from Syracuse University College of Law in 1972, where she was the only woman in the class.

In 1972, she was a part of the Ms. magazine campaign: “We Have Had Abortions” which called for an end to "archaic laws" limiting reproductive freedom, and encouraged women to share their stories and take action.

In 1981, DeCrow was one of the lawyers for former NYPD detective Frank Serpico in his unsuccessful attempt to overturn a child support order on the grounds that the mother had deceived him into the pregnancy by lying about taking the contraceptive pill. DeCrow's decision to defend Serpico in this case attracted some criticism. She told the court “Autonomous women making independent decisions about their lives should not expect men to finance their choice.”

=== Presidency of NOW ===
DeCrow was elected president of NOW from 1974 to 1977, during which time she led campaigns to ensure that collegiate sports would be included under the scope of Title IX, pressured NASA to recruit women as astronauts, oversaw the opening of a new NOW Action Center in Washington, D.C., and the establishment of NOW's National Task Force on Battered Women/Household Violence, and participated in a tour of over 80 public debates with antifeminist activist Phyllis Schlafly over the Equal Rights Amendment.

In 1978, DeCrow became an associate of the Women's Institute for Freedom of the Press. DeCrow was honored by the American Civil Liberties Union in 1985.

== Later life ==
In 2009, DeCrow was inducted into the National Women's Hall of Fame. She died of melanoma on June 6, 2014, in Jamesville, New York.

== Political views ==
She was the author of several books, including The Young Woman’s Guide to Liberation (1971) and Sexist Justice—How Legal Sexism Affects You (1975). DeCrow described her ultimate goal as "a world in which the gender of a baby will have little to no relevance in future pursuits and pleasures—personal, political, economic, social and professional." Toward that end, DeCrow was a supporter of shared parenting (joint legal and shared physical custody) of children when parents divorce. Her position on joint custody was criticized by some in the National Organization for Women: "I've become a persona non grata because I've always been in favor of joint custody," DeCrow said.

Non-profit organization positions
Preceded by Wilma Scott Heide	President of the National Organization for Women; 1974–1977	Succeeded by Eleanor Smeal
