= Ann Schonberger =

American professor (1940–2022)

Ann Elizabeth Koch Schonberger (1940–2022) was a professor at the University of Maine.

== Early life and education ==
Schonberger was born in Madison, Wisconsin. She was educated at Wellesley College. Later, she graduated from Harvard University with a master's degree and finished her PhD in mathematics at the University of Wisconsin. In 1971, she married Howard Schonberger, a history professor.

== Career ==
In 1973, she joined University of Maine and became a faculty member.

In 1991, she became the director of University of Maine's Women's Studies program and women in the curriculum program.

In 2013, she retired as a professor.

== Awards ==
- Maine Public Broadcasting Jefferson Award for Public Service in 1988
- University of Maine Presidential Public Service Award in 2001
- Inducted into National Women's Hall of Fame in 2004
- Merle Nelson Award in 2006
