= Interdepartmental Committee on the Status of Women =

The Interdepartmental Committee on the Status of Women (ICSW) was established by John F. Kennedy, by Executive Order 11126, dated November 1, 1963 and as amended by Executive Order 11221 of May 8, 1965. It was an interdepartmental committee within the Women's Bureau, Department of Labor, and was terminated by Executive Order 12050 of April 4, 1978.

The committee was established to assure effective and continuing leadership in advancing the status of women. The Committee evaluated the progress of federal agencies in this field; served as a clearinghouse and activities related to improving conditions of special interest to women; stimulated cooperation among federal agencies, state and local governments, state commissions on the status of women, and public and private organizations; encouraged research on factors affecting the status of women in education, home and community activities, employment, social insurance, taxes, civil and political rights, and labor legislation.

The committee was composed of the Secretary of Labor, who chaired the committee; the Secretary of State; the Secretary of Defense; the Attorney General; the Secretary of Agriculture; the Secretary of Commerce; the Secretary of Health, Education and Welfare; the Director of the Office of Personnel Management; the Chairman of the Equal Employment Opportunity Commission; and an Assistant Secretary of Labor, designated by the Secretary of Labor. The Director of the Women's Bureau, Department of Labor, served as executive vice chairperson of the committee. The Committee met at least twice a year.

Catherine Shipe East was appointed executive secretary of the committee.
