= Kathryn F. Clarenbach =

American feminist activist (1920–1994)

- Born: October 7, 1920; Sparta, Wisconsin, US
- Died: March 4, 1994 (aged 73)
- Other names: Kay Clarenbach
- Occupation(s): Educator, activist
- Known for: Feminist activism, founding chairperson of NOW

Kathryn F. Clarenbach (October 7, 1920 – March 4, 1994) was an early leader of the modern feminist movement in the United States and the first Chairperson of the National Organization for Women (NOW).

== Early life ==
Kathryn "Kay" Dorothy Frederick was born in Sparta, Wisconsin on October 7, 1920, to Nina and Alexander Frederick. Her mother, Nina, was very active in the community and was elected to the Sparta school board in the early 1920s. Both of her parents were committed to help their children receive the best education possible. Kay started school at age 2,^{1}/_{2} taking 1st and 2nd grade in the same year. It was expected that the Frederick children would attend college; their parents agreed to finance all of their children's educations through a master's degree.

Clarenbach attended Sparta High School, took part in numerous clubs including German club, a cappella choir, orchestra, debate, yearbook, volleyball, basketball, and had the lead part in the senior play.

== College ==
Clarenbach never took a final exam until 1937 when she got to the University of Wisconsin–Madison, so that experience was entirely new for her. Another new experience for her was the need to study. She had a mixture of study partners from a Supreme Court justice, a local lawyer, and a progressive left-winger. Due to the fact women were not allowed in the Rathskeller (a fact that annoyed her), she and her study partner would meet in the Paul Bunyan Room in the union.

Initially, Clarenbach was undecided as to what her major would be. Her father believed she should prepare for a practical career, such as teaching. However, in 1941 she graduated with a Bachelor of Arts in political science.

Clarenbach worked at a gift shop and sold tickets to make spending money during her college years. She spent her free time working on extracurricular activities. She joined the Alpha Chi Omega sorority and later became the house president in 1941.

== Early career ==
In 1942, Clarenbach received her master's degree. In order to support the war effort, she took the federal Civil Service Exam and passed. She then moved to Washington D.C. to work as an administrative analyst with the War Production Board for two years. When she moved back to Madison in 1944, she went back to school to get her Ph.D., which she received two years later in 1946. During her graduate studies, she spent her time as a teacher's assistant. One of her professors introduced her to a fellow student, Henry Clarenbach. On September 5, 1946, Kathryn and Henry Clarenbach were married in Sparta.

After her marriage, Clarenbach was offered teaching jobs at both Purdue University and Bryn Mawr College. She accepted Purdue's offer to teach Political Science. She enjoyed her experience there but left because she was tired of having a commuting marriage. In 1948 Clarenbach and her husband joined others to work on Henry Wallace's unsuccessful presidential campaign. During that time, Henry Clarenbach continued to work toward his Ph.D.

Clarenbach then left the work force to raise her three children: Sara (1949), who became a California attorney; David (1953), who was to become a state legislator; and Janet (1957), who became a NYS Science Teacher. During her time as a new mother Clarenbach was also busy with volunteer work including holding a position on the state board of the Missouri League of Women Voters.

In 1961, when Clarenbach and her family moved back to Madison, Clarenbach took a teaching position at Edgewood College. She also got elected on to the board of trustees at Alverno College. She was very energized by the idea of an all-women college and believed strongly in its mission.

Clarenbach's father encouraged his children to appreciate and be curious about the world outside of Sparta. Throughout her life, Clarenbach's career took her all over the United States, including Hawaii (4 times), the Virgin Islands (1977), Cuba (1978), Europe and Canada (3 or 4 times).

== Feminism ==
In 1962, the focus of Clarenbach's work became women's issues when she was asked to devise a program for continuing education for women through the University of Wisconsin–Extension. Clarenbach was worried about finding childcare when she took this job, but her husband rescheduled his real estate work so he could be at home when the children got home from school. She believed strongly in her work and was impressed by the changes she saw in co-workers and those in the program.

During a statewide conference she organized, Clarenbach's life was changed when the idea of a statewide Governor's Commission on the Status of Women was unanimously recommended. Governor Reynolds was supportive of the idea and worked to get the commission created. In July 1963, Reynolds asked Clarenbach to lead the planning commission and the first conference. The conference took place in January 1964. After the conference the governor asked Clarenbach to chair the commission and she accepted. During her time as chair she helped change and redefine several laws which were unfair to women, such as those on sexual assault, divorce, and marital property. Clarenbach was chair of the commission for 15 years.

== Establishment of NOW ==
In 1966 Betty Friedan and Clarenbach set forth to put some pressure on the federal government. The National Organization for Women (NOW), was founded to fit that need. Clarenbach became the first chair of NOW. NOW's first action was to confront the Equal Employment Opportunity Commission about their sexual discrimination. When they made their point, they received much support. NOW kept growing.

Alarmed at the potential damage that alignment with lesbians could being to the Second Wave feminist movement during its early years, she argued it would be "a disastrous blunder" to support women's sexual freedom.

Clarenbach was requested to be the conference coordinator for the first (and only) National Women's Conference in Houston, Texas, which took place during International Women's Year. Clarenbach learned a lot during her tenure as executive director on the International Women's Year Commission, even though many poor decisions were made during that time due to fear and anxiety from conservative harassment. The conference took place in 1977 and was a success.

== Later life ==
Clarenbach was proud of all that she has done, but was most proud of starting NOW and the Governor's Commission on the Status of Women. She was also proud of her work in the field of continuing education for women. Clarenbach was on the steering committee on the National Association of Commissions on the Status of Women and was its first president in 1970. She chaired the National Women's Political Caucus, and was committed to seeing that women got elected to public office. In 1988 she retired from UW–Madison. Clarenbach and some other co-workers have created a film that has been on demand over the nation, Never Underestimate the Power of Women. She has also edited and published a book, Green Stubborn Bud : Women's Culture at Century's Close.

Clarenbach believed the women's movement hasn't done all it should, especially in educating the younger generation and in getting women elected to public office. But overall, she was proud of its work and progress.

On March 4, 1994, she died due to complications with smoking-related emphysema.
