= Peg Yorkin =

American feminist activist (1927–2023)

- Born: April 16, 1927; New York City, U.S.
- Died: June 25, 2023 (aged 96); Malibu, California, U.S.
- Occupations: Feminist activist, philanthropist
- Spouse: Bud Yorkin (m. 1954; div. 1984)
- Children: 2; including Nicole Yorkin
- Awards: Women of Courage Award 1993

Peg Yorkin (April 16, 1927 – June 25, 2023) was an American feminist activist, philanthropist, and fundraiser. She served as cofounder and chair of the Feminist Majority Foundation.

== Early life ==
Yorkin was born Peggy Diem on April 16, 1927, in New York City, where she also grew up. An only child of a Catholic father and Jewish mother, Yorkin was raised in neither religion and described herself as "no believer". "The religions are patriarchal. I don't believe in any of them, or a God, or a Goddess."

She described her family circumstances as "genteel poverty". Her father's alcoholism negated his career as a cinematographer for legendary filmmaker D.W. Griffith and forced the family to live "on the kindness of my mother's relatives."

She went to Barnard College, had a brief acting stint and an early marriage that lasted two years.

== Career ==
In 1991, she made a $10 million endowment and gift to the Feminist Majority Foundation (of which she was a co-founder and chair) and the Fund for the Feminist Majority, a sister organization that she co-founded in 1987. The first program of the endowment was to help make RU 486 or another anti-progestin available to women. Yorkin received the Women of Courage Award in 1993.

Yorkin spoke at the Feminist Expo 2000 at the Baltimore Convention Center, and also produced live theater in Los Angeles.

Yorkin was criticized by Bitch magazine for saying in 2009, in regard to Roman Polanski, "My personal thoughts are let the guy go. It's bad a person was raped. But that was so many years ago. The guy has been through so much in his life. It's crazy to arrest him now. Let it go. The government could spend its money on other things."

== Personal life ==
Yorkin was married to Bud Yorkin from 1954 until their divorce in 1984. They had two children, Nicole and David, both TV writers. She had four grandchildren.

Yorkin had dementia. She died in her home in Malibu, California on June 23, 2023, at the age of 96.
