= Eleanor Smeal =

American feminist leader

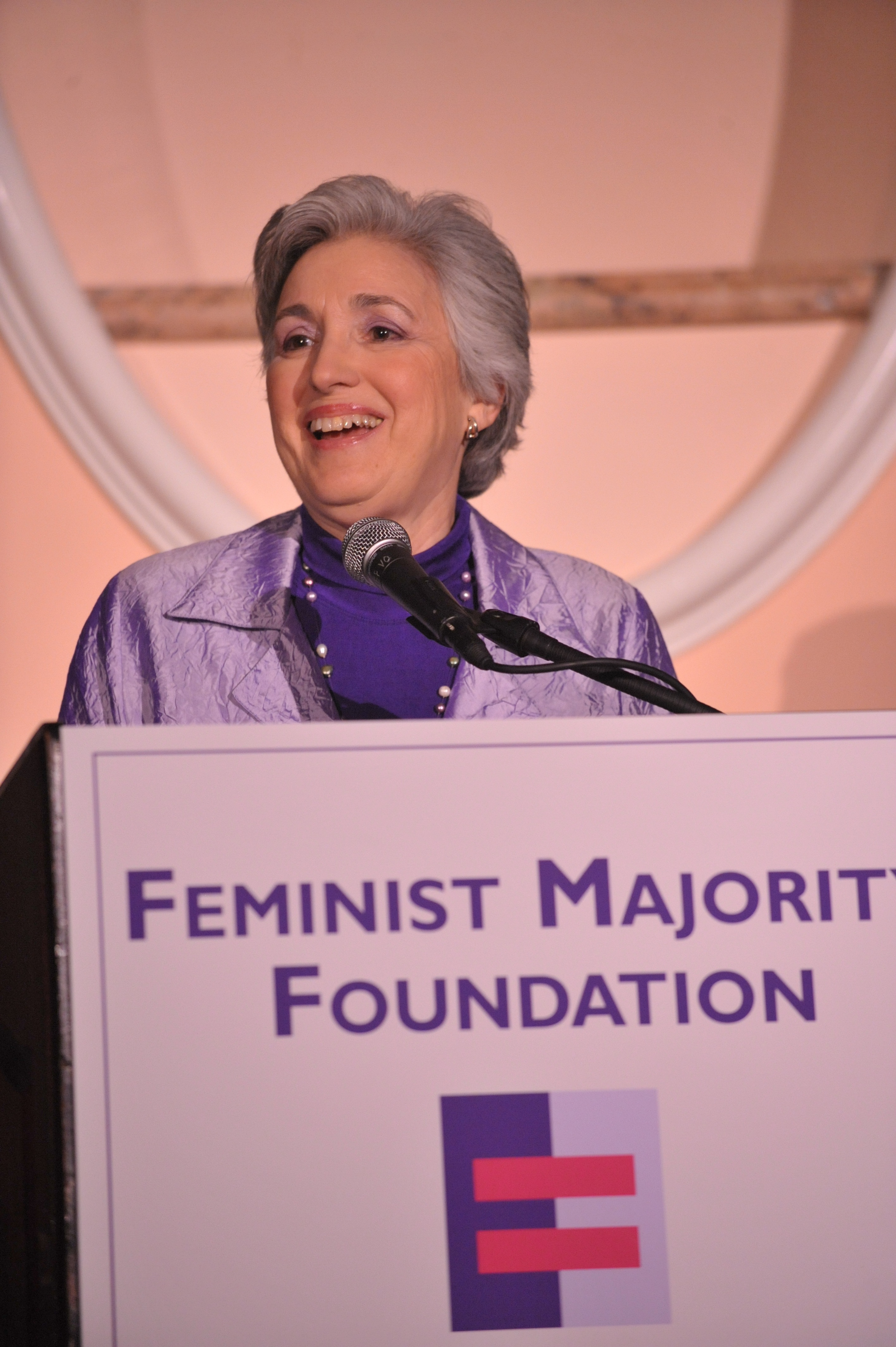
- Smeal in 2009
- Born: Eleanor Marie Cutri; July 30, 1939 (age 87); Ashtabula, Ohio
- Education: University of Florida; Duke University
- Known for: Cofounder of the Feminist Majority Foundation; Twice served as president of the National Organization for Women

Eleanor Marie Smeal (née Cutri; born July 30, 1939) is an American women's rights activist. She is the president and a cofounder of the Feminist Majority Foundation (founded in 1987) and has served as president of the National Organization for Women for three terms, in addition to her work as an activist, grassroots organizer, lobbyist, and political analyst.

Smeal has appeared frequently on television, on shows including Crossfire, Good Morning America, Larry King Live, Nightline, and The Today Show. She has also appeared frequently on radio and testified before Congress. Smeal has organized numerous events around and given speeches on the concepts of feminism, equality, and human rights as they pertain to people in and outside of the United States.

== Early life and education ==
Eleanor Smeal is of Italian ancestry, born on July 30, 1939, to Peter Anthony Cutri and Josephine E. (Agresti), in Ashtabula, Ohio. Her father emigrated to America from Calabria, Italy and became an insurance salesman. She grew up the youngest of three brothers, and was consistently assured by her mother that she was just as capable of anything that her brothers were.

After graduating from Strong Vincent High School in 1957, Smeal attended Duke University. At the time, Duke was not integrated and women made up only 25% of the enrolled students.

Smeal participated in the fight for integration at Duke and graduated Phi Beta Kappa in 1961. She also holds an M.A. in political science and public administration from the University of Florida. Since 2001, Smeal is also the publisher of Ms. magazine which is owned and published by the Feminist Majority Foundation.

== Personal life ==
While attending Duke University Eleanor met Charles Smeal, an engineering student, whom she married on April 27, 1963. Eleanor and Charles had two children together and lived in the area of Pittsburgh, Pennsylvania.

Smeal's interest in feminism and her awareness of feminist issues became increasingly strong during the late 1960s. Already confronted with a lack of day-care facilities for her young child, while also dealing with a back disability, Smeal realized there was no disability insurance for wives and mothers. It was this issue that pushed Smeal into researching further into feminism. Then in 1968, Smeal began a term lasting four years on the board of the local League of Women Voters, and then two years later, joined (along with her husband) the National Organization for Women (NOW). The clear inaccessibility to childcare facilities led her to start a South Hills NOW Day Nursery School where she served as administrator. Newspapers in the 1970s described her as the first housewife to lead the National Organization for Women.

== Political activism ==
Smeal joined the National Organization for Women (NOW) in 1970 and served as president from 1977 to 1982 and again from 1985 to 1987. During this time, in 1986, she led the first national pro-choice march, which drew over 100,000 activists to Washington, DC.

After leaving NOW in 1987, Smeal saw a need for a new feminist organization that combined research, educational outreach, and political action. A 1986 Newsweek/Gallup poll reported that 56% of women in the US self-identify as feminists. Smeal reconciled her vision of a new feminist organization and the task of empowering women and men who support equity by cofounding the Feminist Majority Foundation in 1987.

Several legislative measures bear Smeal's imprint including the Free Access to Clinic Entrances legislation (influenced by Madsen v. Women's Health Center) that President Bill Clinton signed into law in 1994, the unsuccessful attempt to defeat Proposition 209 in California, the Pregnancy Discrimination Act, the Equal Credit Act, the Civil Rights Restoration Act, the Violence Against Women Act, the Freedom of Access to Clinic Entrances Act, the Civil Rights Act of 1991 and the unsuccessful 1970s and 1980s fight to ratify the Equal Rights Amendment.

She describes why she feels called to fight for equality in a 1995 interview with Babara Koeppel:

"And I think you affect your own moral well-being in the process. It's like, if I step over a body that is lying in the street, I have not helped that person who needed my help, but I have just as surely lost a part of my own humanity. Eventually, you become numb to human suffering. Those of us in the abused classes do the most pushing, but there are no winners in this kind of thing. It should not be a divisive thing; no one should feel threatened. The appeal is to all people. We should all rise."

== Presidency in NOW organization ==
=== First presidency term (1977-1979) ===
Eleanor Smeal was first elected as the President of NOW in 1977, preceded by President Karen DeCrow. In total, Smeal was elected as NOW's President three times.

Smeal was elected at a time when conference delegates had authorized a NOW ERA (Equal Rights Amendment) Strike Force to campaign for ratification. Upon hearing that the deadline for the ratification for ERA, Smeal convinced Elizabeth Holztman, a member of the United States House of Representatives, to bring the proposal to Congress. In this time of great desire for equal rights, Smeal played a key role and was a major organizer of the 1978 March for ERA. This march brought over 100,000 marchers and as a result, Congress voted to extend the deadline for ERA to June 30, 1982.

=== Second presidency term (1979-1982) ===
In 1979, Smeal was reelected as NOW's President, running for her second term as the head of the organization. In her second run as President, Smeal focused her efforts on making Social Security more fair for women, testifying against restrictions on abortion funding for military personnel and their dependents, and Lesbian and Gay rights. Smeal led NOW organizers to help stage the 1979 National March for Lesbian and Gay rights.

At the time of Smeal's second term of Presidency in NOW, Ronald Reagan was also elected as the United States President. Around the time of his inauguration in January, Smeal and the NOW organization launched and led a national campaign to stop Reagan's anti-abortion "Human Life Amendment." Smeal was also the first person to coin the term "gender gap" when she analyzed in the National NOW Times just how different the votes by men versus the votes by women really are. Despite the grand efforts made by NOW during Smeal's presidency to get the ERA ratified, towards the end of Smeal's second term in 1982, the Amendment was shy three states and therefore did not get passed.

At the end of her second term, which lasted longer than a traditional two-year term due to the decision to allow Smeal to continue her efforts, uninterrupted, on ratifying the ERA, Smeal had boosted NOW to a whopping 220,000 members and a budget of $13 million annually. While Smeal worked extensively on the ERA, some members felt that she lacked focus in areas such as minority and abortion rights, which became part of the focus of Smeal's successor, Judy Goldsmith.

=== Third presidency term (1985-1987) ===
Smeal's run for presidency the third time around was hard-fought against previous President Judy Goldsmith. Smeal initially supported Goldsmith when she ran for Presidency after Smeal's second term, but now challenged Goldsmith the second time around. Smeal, during a telephone interview, stated that while she and Goldsmith did not differ on the philosophical concepts of equal rights, they differed on the political realities of how to obtain those rights to the fullest. Much of the campaign focused not on the issues the candidates themselves supported, but rather on their tactical approaches towards the issues.

One of the biggest reasons Smeal decided to run for yet another term as President was not only due to the support of many other NOW members, but from her wish that NOW could be more outspoken, assertive, and publicly active on multiple different issues. These issues included abortion rights, on the role of women in the church, and the Vatican's policy on reproduction. Smeal also noted that while Goldsmith was in power the organization lost its focus and membership declined and she wanted to do something about that.

In July 1985, Smeal won by a 139-vote margin over Goldsmith. Upon being elected for the third and final time as NOW's President, Smeal stated she would continue Goldsmith's efforts on reproductive rights as well as set forth plans to stage a reproductive rights march for the next year. This march, which took place in 1986 was the first March for Women's Lives and brought over 150,000 people to Washington and Los Angeles in support of women's reproductive rights. In 1987 Smeal also founded the Feminist Majority.

== Work on behalf of the Equal Rights Amendment ==
Smeal is a longtime supporter of the Equal Rights Amendment (ERA) and has campaigned for its passage since the 1970s. She has campaigned for the ERA for over fifty years. In January 2022 she led a rally outside of Lafayette Square in front of the White House exactly two years after Virginia became the 38th state to ratify the Amendment in January 2020. Smeal continues to lobby for the ratification of the ERA and is one of the most prominent activists for its passage.

== Recognition ==
In 1979, the Supersisters trading card set was produced and distributed; one of the cards featured Smeal's name and picture.

Also in 1979, Time magazine chose her as one of 50 Faces for America's Future (August 6, 1979).

In 1983, World Almanac chose Smeal as one of the most influential women in the United States.

In 2008, the American Humanist Association awarded Smeal the Humanist Heroine Award.

In 2010 Smeal delivered the commencement address at Rutgers University's graduation and was conferred a Doctorate of Human Letters honoris causa.

In 2015 Smeal was inducted into the National Women's Hall of Fame.

U.S. News & World Report chose her as the fourth most influential Washington lobbyist.

In January 2025, President Joe Biden named Smeal as a recipient of the Presidential Citizens Medal, along with nineteen others.

== Writing ==
In 1980 she coined the term "gender gap" in reference to a difference in how men and women vote by political party; the term is now commonly used in writing with that meaning. Her 1984 book How and Why Women Will Elect the Next President successfully identified a gender gap in politics.

She contributed the piece "The Art of Building Feminist Institutions to Last" to the 2003 anthology Sisterhood Is Forever: The Women's Anthology for a New Millennium, edited by Robin Morgan.

== See also ==
- List of women's rights activists

Preceded by Karen DeCrow	President of the National Organization for Women; 1977 - 1982	Succeeded by Judy Goldsmith
Preceded by Judy Goldsmith	President of the National Organization for Women; 1985 - 1987	Succeeded by Molly Yard
