= Feminist Majority Foundation =

American non-profit organisation

- Formation: 1987; 39 years ago
- Founders: Eleanor Smeal; Peg Yorkin; Katherine Spillar; Toni Carabillo; Judith Meuli
- Type: Non-profit organization
- Purpose: Women's equality, reproductive health, and non-violence
- Headquarters: Arlington County, Virginia, U.S.
- President: Eleanor Smeal
- Chair of the Board: Peg Yorkin
- Executive Director: Katherine Spillar
- Subsidiaries: Ms. magazine
- Website: feminist.org

The Feminist Majority Foundation (FMF) is an American non-profit organization headquartered in Arlington County, Virginia, whose stated mission is to advance non-violence and women's power, equality, and economic development. The name Feminist Majority comes from a 1986 Newsweek/Gallup public opinion poll in which 56 percent of American women self-identified as feminists. President and one of the founders, Eleanor Smeal, chose the name to reflect the results of the poll, implying that the majority of women are feminists.

== History and structure ==
The FMF—an IRS 501(c)(3) tax deductible, non-profit organization—is a research and education organization and the publisher of Ms. magazine. Founded in 1987 by Eleanor Smeal, Peg Yorkin, Katherine Spillar, Toni Carabillo, and Judith Meuli, it has offices in Washington, D.C., and Los Angeles, California. Its chair is Peg Yorkin.

FMF became the publisher of Ms. in 2001, supporting the magazine in becoming a non-profit organization. Co-founded in 1972 by political activist and feminist Gloria Steinem, Ms. is a women's magazine owned and produced by women that publishes articles on the conditions of women in the United States and abroad.

The FMF has several campaigns and programs that deal with Women's Health and Reproductive Rights domestically and abroad, including:

- National Clinic Access Project
- Campaign for Women's Health
- Mifepristone
- Feminist Campus (Choices Campus Leadership Program)
- Global Reproductive Rights Campaign
- Campaign for Afghan Women and Girls
- Emergency Contraception Initiative
- National Center for Women and Policing
- Education Equity Program
- Rock for Choice

== History ==
During 1989-92, the FMF conducted the Feminization of Power campaign, recruiting an unprecedented number of women to run for public office, resulting in doubling women's representation in the United States Congress in 1992 (the Year of the Woman). In 1992, FMF helped to secure support for the Iowa Equal Rights Amendment and, in 1996, it helped to counter an anti-(reverse)discrimination ballot measure in California.

In 2004, the Feminist Majority was one of five principal organizers of the "March for Women's Lives", which brought more than 1.15 million women and men to Washington, D.C., in support of reproductive rights. In 2006, FMF failed to overturn an anti-discrimination ballot measure in Michigan (the Michigan Civil Rights Initiative, which passed in 2006 and was upheld by the Supreme Court in 2014) and to pass a ballot initiative in South Dakota to repeal a state abortion ban. On March 23 and 24 of 2013, FMF hosted its 9th Annual National Young Feminist Leadership conference in Arlington, Virginia, with speakers such as Dolores Huerta (President, Dolores Huerta Foundation/Co-Founder United Farm Workers/Recipient of Presidential Medal of Freedom), Morgane Richardson (Founder of Refuse The Silence), Monica Simpson (Executive Director, Sister Song), Ivanna Gonzalez (Who Needs Feminism?).

Despite its declared support of non-violence, the FMF endorsed the war in Afghanistan with the justification that it would help to protect and liberate Afghan women, a position which was criticized by American politician Tom Hayden in 2011.

== Legislative initiatives ==
The Feminist Majority has also been a leader in legislative victories for women including amending the Civil Rights Act of 1991 to provide for monetary damages to women who win sexual harassment and sex discrimination lawsuits in court; winning passage of the Family and Medical Leave Act of 1993; the Violence Against Women Act and the Freedom of Access to Clinic Entrances Act, in 1994; passing the Domestic Violence Offender Gun Ban, in 1996; restoring Title IX, in 1988, and then successfully defending Title IX against the Bush administration's attempts to discourage discrimination against men, in 2003, among other victories. The Feminist Majority continues advocating for U.S. ratification of, both, the United Nations Women's Rights Treaty CEDAW, the Convention to End all forms of Discrimination Against Women) and the International Criminal Court.

== See also ==
- Equal Rights Amendment
- Feminism
- Liberal feminism
- Social justice
- Progressivism
