= National Organization for Women =

American feminist organization

- Abbreviation: NOW
- Formation: June 30, 1966; 60 years ago
- Founders: Betty Friedan; Pauli Murray and 47 other people
- Type: 501(c)(4), charitable organization
- Tax ID no.: 74-2587416
- Purpose: Women's rights, feminism, Equal Rights Amendment, civil rights, LGBT rights, reproductive rights
- Headquarters: Washington, D.C., U.S.
- Members: 500,000 (21st century)
- President: Kim Villanueva
- Website: www.NOW.org
- Remarks: "Taking Action for Women's Equality Since 1966"

The National Organization for Women (NOW) is an American progressive-left feminist organization. Founded in 1966, it is legally a 501(c)(4) social welfare organization. The organization consists of 550 chapters in all 50 U.S. states and in Washington, D.C. It is the largest feminist organization in the United States with around 500,000 members. NOW is regarded as one of the main liberal feminist organizations in the US, and primarily lobbies for gender equality within the existing political system. NOW campaigns for constitutional equality, economic justice, reproductive rights, LGBTQIA+ rights and racial justice, and against violence against women.

== History ==
=== Background ===
Many influences contributed to the rise of NOW. Such influences included the President's Commission on the Status of Women, Betty Friedan's 1963 book The Feminine Mystique, and the passage and lack of enforcement of the Civil Rights Act of 1964 (prohibiting sexual discrimination).

The President's Commission on the Status of Women was established in 1961 by John F. Kennedy, in hopes of providing a solution to female discrimination in education, work force, and Social Security. Kennedy appointed Eleanor Roosevelt as the head of the organization. The goal was to reconcile those wanting to advance women's rights in the workforce (such as advocates of the Equal Rights Amendment) and those advocating women's domestic role needing to be preserved (such as organized labor groups). The commission was a way to settle the tension between opposing sides.

Betty Friedan wrote The Feminine Mystique in response to her own experiences; the book's purpose was to fuel movement to a women's role outside of domestic environment. Acknowledging some satisfaction from raising children, cooking, and rearranging house decor was not enough to suffice the deeper desire for women to achieve an education. The book is widely credited with sparking the beginning of second-wave feminism in the United States. It was published on February 19, 1963, by W. W. Norton. In an interview, Friedan specifically notes,

There was no activism in that cause when I wrote Feminine Mystique. But I realized that it was not enough just to write a book. There had to be social change. And I remember somewhere in that period coming off an airplane [and] some guy was carrying a sign... It said, "The first step in revolution is consciousness." Well, I did the consciousness with The Feminine Mystique. But then there had to be organization and there had to be a movement. And I helped organize NOW, the National Organization for Women and the National Women's Political Caucus and NARAL, the abortion rights [organization] in the next few years.

=== Founding ===
The National Organization for Women (NOW) was founded in 1966 by 28 women at the Third National Conference of Commissions on the Status of Women in June (the successor to the Presidential Commission on the Status of Women), and another 21 women and men who became founders at the October 1966 NOW Organizing Conference, for a total of 49 founders. Both conferences were held in Washington, D.C. The 28 women who became founders in June were: Ada Allness, Mary Evelyn Benbow, Gene Boyer, Shirley Chisholm, Analoyce Clapp, Kathryn F. Clarenbach, Catherine Conroy, Caroline Davis, Mary Eastwood, Edith Finlayson, Betty Friedan, Dorothy Haener, Anna Roosevelt Halstead, Lorene Harrington, Aileen Hernandez, Mary Lou Hill, Esther Johnson, Nancy Knaak, Min Matheson, Helen Moreland, Pauli Murray, Ruth Murray, Inka O'Hanrahan, Pauline A. Parish, Eve Purvis, Edna Schwartz, Mary-Jane Ryan Snyder, Gretchen Squires, Betty Talkington and Caroline Ware.

They were inspired by the failure of the Equal Employment Opportunity Commission to enforce Title VII of the Civil Rights Act of 1964; at the Third National Conference of State Commissions on the Status of Women they were prohibited from issuing a resolution that recommended the EEOC carry out its legal mandate to end sex discrimination in employment. They thus gathered in Betty Friedan's hotel room to form a new organization. On a paper napkin Friedan scribbled the acronym "NOW". The 21 people who became founders in October were: Caruthers Berger, Colleen Boland, Inez Casiano, Carl Degler, Elizabeth Drews, Mary Esther Gaulden (later Jagger), Muriel Fox, Ruth Gober, Richard Graham, Anna Arnold Hedgeman, Lucille Kapplinger (later Hazell), Bessie Margolin, Margorie Palmer, Sonia Pressman (later Fuentes), Sister Mary Joel Read, Amy Robinson, Charlotte Roe, Alice Rossi, Claire R. Salmond, Morag Simchak and Clara Wells.

The founders were frustrated with the way in which the federal government was not enforcing the new anti-discrimination laws. Even after measures like the Equal Employment Opportunity Commission (EEOC) and Title VII of the Civil Rights Act of 1964, employers were still discriminating against women in terms of hiring women and unequal pay with men. Women's rights advocates saw that these legal changes were not being enforced and worried that without a feminist pressure group, a type of "NAACP for women", women would not be able to combat discrimination. NOW was created to mobilize women, give women's rights advocates the power to put pressure on employers and the government, and to promote full equality of the sexes. It hoped to increase the number of women attending colleges and graduate schools, employed in professional jobs instead of domestic or secretarial work, and appointed to federal offices. NOW's Statement of Purpose, which was adopted at its organizing conference in Washington, D.C., on October 29, 1966, declares among other things that "the time has come to confront, with concrete action, the conditions that now prevent women from enjoying the equality of opportunity and freedom of choice which is their right, as individual Americans, and as human beings." NOW was also one of the first women's organizations to include the concerns of black women in their efforts.

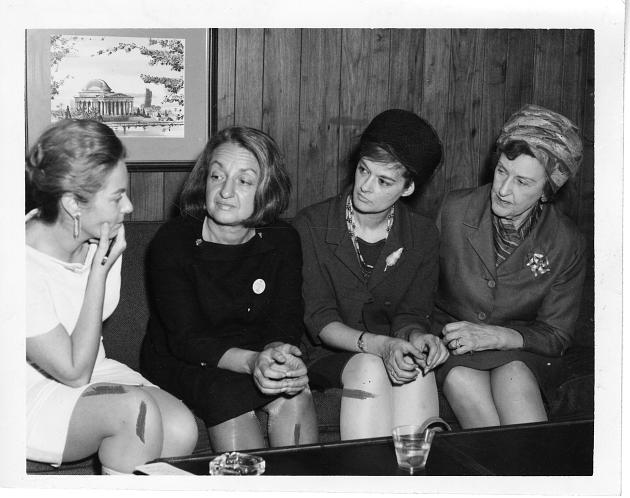
NOW founder and president Betty Friedan (1921–2006) with lobbyist Barbara Ireton (1932–1998) and feminist attorney Marguerite Rawalt (1895–1989)

Betty Friedan and Pauli Murray wrote NOW's Statement of Purpose in 1966; the original was scribbled on a napkin by Friedan. Also in 1966, Marguerite Rawalt became a member of NOW, and acted as their first legal counsel. NOW's first Legal Committee consisted of Catherine East, Mary Eastwood, Phineas Indritz, and Caruthers Berger; it was the first to sue on behalf of airline flight attendants claiming sex discrimination.

In 1968 NOW issued a Bill of Rights, which they had adopted at their 1967 national conference, advocating the passage of the Equal Rights Amendment, enforcement of the prohibitions against sex discrimination in employment under Title VII of the Civil Rights Act of 1964, maternity leave rights in employment and in Social Security benefits, tax deduction for home and child care expenses for working parents, child day care centers, equal and non-gender-segregated education, equal job training opportunities and allowances for women in poverty, and the right of women to control their reproductive lives. The NOW bill of rights was included in the 1970 anthology Sisterhood is Powerful: An Anthology of Writings From The Women's Liberation Movement, edited by Robin Morgan.

=== Lesbian rights ===
In 1969, Ivy Bottini, who was openly lesbian, designed the logo for NOW, which is still in use today. The first time lesbian concerns were introduced into NOW also occurred in 1969, when Bottini, who was then president of the New York chapter of NOW, held a public forum titled "Is Lesbianism a Feminist Issue?". However, NOW president Betty Friedan was against lesbian participation in the movement. In 1969, she referred to growing lesbian visibility as a "lavender menace" and fired openly lesbian newsletter editor Rita Mae Brown, and in 1970 she engineered the expulsion of lesbians, including Bottini, from NOW's New York chapter. In reaction, at the 1970 Congress to Unite Women, on the first evening when all four hundred feminists were assembled in the auditorium, twenty women wearing T-shirts that read "Lavender Menace" came to the front of the room and faced the audience. One of the women then read their group's paper "The Woman-Identified Woman", which was the first major lesbian feminist statement. The group, who later named themselves "Radicalesbians", were among the first to challenge the heterosexism of heterosexual feminists and to describe lesbian experience in positive terms.

In 1971, NOW passed a resolution declaring "that a woman's right to her own person includes the right to define and express her own sexuality and to choose her own lifestyle", as well as a conference resolution stating that forcing lesbian mothers to stay in marriages or to live a secret existence in an effort to keep their children was unjust. That year, NOW also committed to offering legal and moral support in a test case involving child custody rights of lesbian mothers. In 1973, the NOW Task Force on Sexuality and Lesbianism was established. Del Martin was the first open lesbian elected to NOW, and Del Martin and Phyllis Lyon were the first lesbian couple to join NOW.

=== Activism ===
==== Anti-discrimination ====
NOW also helped women get equal access to public places. For example, the Oak Room held men-only lunches on weekdays until 1969, when Friedan and other members of NOW staged a protest. As well, women were not allowed in McSorley's Old Ale House's until August 10, 1970, after NOW attorneys Faith Seidenberg and Karen DeCrow filed a discrimination case against the bar in District Court and won. The two entered McSorley's in 1969 and were refused service, which was the basis for their lawsuit for discrimination. The case decision made the front page of The New York Times on June 26, 1970. The suit, Seidenberg v. McSorleys' Old Ale House (1970, United States District Court, S. D. New York), established that, as a public place, the bar could not violate the Equal Protection Clause of the United States Constitution. The bar was then forced to admit women, but it did so "kicking and screaming". With the ruling allowing women to be served, the bathroom became unisex, and it took 16 years for the ladies room to be installed.

Carole De Saram, who joined NOW in 1970 and was later president of the New York chapter, led a demonstration in 1972 to protest discriminatory banking policies. She encouraged women to withdraw savings from a Citibank branch in protest of their practices, causing a branch to close. NOW led numerous similar protests, and in 1974, their actions led directly to the passage of the Equal Credit Opportunity Act.

==== Equal Rights Amendment (ERA) ====
Advocacy of the Equal Rights Amendment was also an important issue to NOW. The amendment had three primary objectives, which were:

Section 1. Equality of Rights under the law shall not be denied or abridged by the United States or any state on account of sex.

Section 2. The Congress shall have the power to enforce, by appropriate legislation, the provisions of this article.

Section 3. This amendment shall take effect two years after the date of ratification.

Efforts were proven successful when Congress passed the amendment in 1972. However, simply passing the amendment in the two houses of Congress did not mean the work was finished. NOW had to direct the efforts of getting the amendment ratified in at least three-fourths of the states (38 out of the 50 states).

In response to opposing states denying the ratification of the amendment, NOW encouraged members to participate in marches and economic boycotts. "Dozens of organizations supported the ERA and the boycott, including the League of Women Voters, the YWCA of the U.S., the Unitarian Universalist Association, the United Auto Workers (UAW), the National Education Association (NEA), and the Democratic National Committee (DNC)."

As strong as the support was, it was to no avail to the opposition from various groups. These groups included select religious collectives, business and insurance interests, and most visibly was the STOP-ERA campaign led by antifeminist Phyllis Schlafly. Schlafly argued on the premise that creating equality in the work force or anywhere else would hinder the laws that are instilled for the mere protection of these women. The safety of women was a higher priority than ensuring there is equality in financial and social scenarios. The predicament over the Equal Rights Amendment was not a fight between men and women who abhor men, but rather two groups of women advocating different perspectives on the nature of their lives. The rivalry was sparked in speeches, such as that of Schlafly who began her dialogue by thanking her husband for allowing her to participate in such an activity.

Even though the efforts did not prove to be enough to have the amendment ratified, the organization remains active in lobbying legislatures and media outlets on feminist issues.

==== Abortion ====
Abortion being an individual woman's choice has come into the forefront since the Supreme Court case of Roe v. Wade in 1973. The decision of the court was that it ultimately was the woman's choice in reproduction. However, according to the National Organization for Women, decisions following the 1973 landmark case had substantially limited this right, which culminated in their response to encourage the Freedom of Choice Act. The controversy over the landmark case ruling was initiated in the two cases, Gonzales v. Planned Parenthood and Gonzales v. Carhart. These two cases consequently banned abortion methods after 12 weeks of pregnancy.

Gonzales v. Planned Parenthood and Gonzales v. Carhart both dealt with the question of whether the 2003 Partial-Birth Abortion Ban Act was unconstitutional for violating the Due Process Clause of the Fifth Amendment expressed in the Roe v. Wade case. This act ultimately meant that the concept of partial-birth abortion as defined in the Act as any abortion in which the death of the fetus occurs when "the entire fetal head [...] or [...] any part of the fetal trunk past the navel is outside the body of the mother" is banned. The Supreme Court ultimately decided 5–4 that it was not unconstitutional and did not hinder a woman's right to an abortion.

National Organization for Women claimed it was a disregard to a basic principle stemming from Roe v. Wade, which was to only have legislative restriction on abortion be justified with the intention of protecting women's health. Hence, the support for the Freedom of Choice Act (FOCA), which primary purpose was to safeguard a woman's access to abortions even if the Roe v. Wade ruling is further disregarded. As of 2013, there are seven states that have made the Freedom of Choice Act (FOCA) state law. FOCA will consequently supersede any other law prohibiting abortion in those seven states. They are: California, Connecticut, Hawaii, Maryland, Nevada, Wisconsin, Maine, and Washington. In addition, Maryland, Nevada, and Washington were the only three states to adhere via ballot initiative.

Succeeding in the enactment of FOCA would ultimately mean fulfilment of three goals for the National Organization for Women. First, asserting a woman's reproductive right. Second, disseminate information to the public audience about threats posed in the two court cases mentioned above. Third, through the dissemination of information to the public, this in return would mobilize efforts to support female rights in multiple areas that will be presented in the future.

=== Women's Strike for Equality ===
On August 26, 1970, the 50th anniversary of the ratification of the Nineteenth Amendment which granted women the right to vote, NOW officially sponsored the Women's Strike for Equality, a nationwide demonstration for women's rights. Approximately 10,000 women took to the streets of New York City's Fifth Avenue for the strike and about 50,000 participants, mostly women, in total all throughout the country. Time described the event as "easily the largest women's rights rally since the suffrage protests". The organizers of the strike approved three main goals: free abortion care, 24/7 childcare centers, and equal opportunity in jobs and education. Other goals included passage of the Equal Rights Amendment, political representation, and no forced sterilization. Public reaction and media coverage were mixed. Many spectators called the demonstrators anti-feminine, "ridiculous exhibitionists," "a band of wild lesbians", or Communists, but the event was generally uninterrupted. The strike was a major success. Weeks after the event, NOW's membership rose by 50 percent, and a CBS News poll found that four out of five people had heard or read about women's liberation.

== Core issues ==
NOW campaigns for constitutional equality, economic justice, reproductive rights, LGBTQIA+ rights and racial justice, and against violence against women.

=== Constitutional equality ===
NOW supports the Equal Rights Amendment and works to give women explicit protections in the United States Constitution.

=== Economic justice ===
NOW advocates for economic justice.

=== Reproductive rights ===
NOW supports safe and legal abortion, affordable birth control and other contraception, and reproductive health education.

=== Ending violence against women ===
NOW works to end violence against women.

=== Racial justice ===
NOW has been involved in the civil rights struggle since 1966, and advocates for equal opportunities for women of color in all areas of society, such as employment, education & health care.

=== LGBTQIA+ rights ===
NOW supports LGBTQIA+ rights as one of its core issues. NOW president Terry O'Neill has said the struggle against transphobia is a feminist issue. NOW has affirmed that "trans women are women, trans girls are girls." In a further statement NOW said that "trans women are women. They deserve equal opportunity, health care, a safe community & workplace, and they deserve to play sports. They have a right to have their identity respected without conforming to perceived sex and gender identity standards. We stand with you." NOW has said that "'debate' about trans girls and women in school sports spreads transphobia and bigotry through the false lens of 'fairness'" that amounts to a hate campaign. NOW has further said that "waging a hate campaign against trans people is not feminist." NOW supports the use of inclusive language.

On January 28, 2025, NOW and more than 170 other women's rights organizations issued an open letter condemning the persecution of transgender people under the second Trump administration. The letter described Executive Order 14166, which defined legal recognition of women strictly by reproductive biology and sought to restrict transgender rights, as "cruel and lawless". The organizations argued that its true intent was to stigmatize and discriminate against transgender, nonbinary, and intersex people while enforcing gender stereotypes.

== Goals ==
Betty Friedan and Pauli Murray wrote the organization's Statement of Purpose in 1966. The statement described the purpose of NOW as "to take action to bring women into full participation in the mainstream of American society now, exercising all privileges and responsibilities thereof in truly equal partnership with men." The six core issues that NOW addresses are abortion and reproductive health services access, violence against women, constitutional equality, promoting diversity/ending racism, lesbian rights, and economic justice, with these issues having various sub-issues. The organization goes about creating these changes through laborious lobbying, rallies, marches, and conferences. NOW focuses on a variety of issues deploying multiple strategies, causing it to be an organization in which a comprehensive goal is envisaged and performed.

Priorities mentioned above were pursued to ultimately secure constitutional amendments guaranteeing these rights. Even though discrimination on the basis of sex was illegal, the federal government was not taking an active role in enforcing the constitutional amendments and the new policies. NOW sought to apply pressure to employers, local governments, and the federal government to uphold anti-discrimination policies. Through litigation, political pressure, and physical marches, NOW members held an authoritative stance leading to recognition in court cases, such as NOW v. Scheidler and Weeks v. Southern Bell.

NOW v. Scheidler revolved around the issue of racketeering to gain support for anti-abortion groups. NOW was suing the groups for use of violence and the threat of violence for garnering support. The violence varied from physical barriers into entrances of abortion clinic to arson and bombings of those clinics. The plaintiff accused the Pro-Life Action Network (PLAN) of unethically seizing the right of women to make decisions about their own bodies and argued that this right needed to be defended. The case was a success in terms of the class action suit "brought against terrorists by those they had terrorized".

However the case was dismissed based on the mere definition of racketeering because racketeering must have an economic inclination, and there was no evidence to prove PLAN had this financial intention. This does not mean it was not a significant case. It brought light and recognition to National Organization for Women and its goals. If anything, it galvanized the organization to strengthen its tactics.

Weeks v. Southern Bell had the same effect, but this is an example where those galvanized efforts proved beneficial. This concerned discriminatory practices against women in the workplace. Lorena Weeks, employee of Southern Bell, claimed she was being discriminated against via exclusion to higher paying positions within the company. Sylvia Roberts acted as her attorney, supporting Week's grievances with the accusation of the company's violation of Title VII of the Civil Rights Act of 1964. Title VII is enabled to "protect individuals against employment discrimination on the bases of race and color, as well as national origin, sex, and religion". With this premise, Weeks, with the aid of Sylvia Roberts, succeeded in 1969 after making an appeal. The trial not only served as the triumph of National Organization for Women, but brought to life legislation made to the intentions of organizations, such as NOW.

== Organizational media ==
NOW published a national newsletter, Do It NOW, beginning in 1970, edited by Muriel Fox. From 1977, the journal has been known as the National NOW Times (ISSN 0149-4740).

== Presidents ==
The following women have led the National Organization for Women:

- Betty Friedan, 1966–1970
- Aileen Hernandez, 1970–1971
- Wilma Scott Heide, 1971–1974
- Karen DeCrow, 1974–1977
- Eleanor Smeal, 1977–1982
- Judy Goldsmith, 1982–1985
- Eleanor Smeal, 1985–1987
- Molly Yard, 1987–1991
- Patricia Ireland, 1991–2001
- Kim Gandy, 2001–2009
- Terry O'Neill, 2009–2017
- Toni Van Pelt, 2017–2020
- Christian Nunes, 2020–2025
- Kim Villanueva, 2025 to present

== Criticism ==
NOW has been criticized by various anti-abortion, conservative, and fathers' rights groups.

During the 1990s, NOW was criticized by the Los Angeles Times for having a double standard when it refused to support Paula Jones in her sexual harassment suit against former Democratic President Bill Clinton, while calling for the resignation of Republican politician Bob Packwood, who was accused of similar assault by 10 women. The Jones suit was later dismissed by U.S. District Judge Susan Webber Wright, ruling that Mrs. Jones' allegations, even if true, would not qualify as a case of sexual harassment. Jones appealed but later dropped her suit after reaching a settlement out of court for $850,000. Judge Webber Wright later held President Clinton in contempt of court for giving "intentionally false" testimony about his relationship with Monica Lewinsky in the Paula Jones lawsuit, marking the first time that a sitting president has been sanctioned for disobeying a court order.

NOW is regarded as one of the main liberal feminist organizations in the US, and primarily lobbies for gender equality within the existing political system. NOW has been criticized for not supporting anti-abortion feminists. Some members, such as LA NOW chapter president Tammy Bruce left NOW, saying they oppose putting liberal and partisan policy positions above equality for all women. Tammy Bruce has attacked NOW for not doing enough to advocate for international women's rights, but instead attacking the George W. Bush White House for their conservative positions. Accusations of putting politics above feminism began in 1982, the year the ERA was defeated, when NOW, under President Judy Goldsmith, fiercely opposed Reaganomics and Republican feminist Congresswoman Millicent Fenwick's Democratic opponent, Frank Lautenberg, due to Fenwick's support of Ronald Reagan's economic agenda.

Additionally, Deborah Watkins, who was once the President of the Dallas Chapter of NOW, left NOW in 2003 to found, in the same year, the Dallas-Fort Worth Chapter of the National Coalition for Men, stating she grew tired of what she considered "hypocrisy" and "male bashing" at NOW.

NOW was criticised by Fox News' Megyn Kelly in 2014 for by putting Little Sisters of the Poor on their 'Dirty 100" list'.

== See also ==
- Feminism in the United States
- List of presidents of the National Organization for Women
- List of Woman of Courage Award winners
- She's Beautiful When She's Angry － a documentary about the founders of the modern women's movement, including discussions of the National Organization for Women and some of its founders (Muriel Fox, Jacqui Ceballos and Rita Mae Brown)
- RightRides - A bus service that was recognized by the National Organization for Women

== General Reference ==
- National Organization for Women (NOW), New York State Chapter Records, 1961-2011. M.E. Grenander Department of Special Collections and Archives, University Libraries, University at Albany, State University of New York (hereafter referred to as NOW, New York State Chapter Records).
