= Pogrebin =

Pogrebin is a surname. Notable people with the surname include:

- Abigail Pogrebin (born 1965), American writer, daughter of Letty and twin sister of Robin
- Letty Cottin Pogrebin (born 1939), American author, journalist, lecturer, and social activist
- Robin Pogrebin (born 1965), American reporter, daughter of Letty and twin sister of Abigail
