= Pat Carbine =

American feminist and magazine editor

- Born: January 31, 1931 (age 95); Villanova, Pennsylvania, U.S.
- Education: Rosemont College (B.A.)
- Occupation: Magazine editor
- Known for: Co-founder of Ms.

Patricia Theresa Carbine (born January 31, 1931) is an American feminist and magazine editor. She was executive editor of Look, which was the highest position held by a woman at a general interest magazine, and the vice president and editor-in-chief of McCall's. She was one of the founders of Ms. magazine and served as one of the first publishers and the first editor-in-chief.

== Early life ==
Carbine was born on January 31, 1931, in Villanova, Pennsylvania. Her parents are James T. Carbine and Margaret Carbine (née Dee). She attended Mater Misericordiae Academy between 1936 and 1948. She received her Bachelor of Arts degree in English from Rosemont College in 1952. She was a trustee of the college between 1972 and 1996.

== Career ==
Carbine joined the magazine Look in 1953 as an editorial researcher, eventually being promoted as assistant managing editor in 1959. She became the managing editor in 1966 and the executive editor in 1969, which was the highest position held by a woman at a general interest magazine, although the owner of the magazine refused to put a woman's name on the top of the masthead. She went on strike on August 26, 1970, for the Women's Strike for Equality. In 1970, she became the vice president and editor-in-chief of McCall's, where she tried to modernize the magazine with a new section called 'Right Now'.

=== Ms. magazine ===
In 1971, she was approached by Gloria Steinem who was looking to create a newsletter focusing on the women's movement. Along with Elizabeth Forsling Harris, Carbine convinced her that a magazine was the best approach as it was more likely to make money and to serve as a 'forum'. The trio attempted to source funding for the project and finally received an offer from Clay Felker, editor of New York magazine, who suggested publishing a preview of the new magazine – titled Ms. – in the year-end issue of New York and as a stand-alone January issue.

In January 1972, when the initial issue was selling out, Carbine left McCall's to join Ms. as a publisher. The decision was encouraged by a couple of incidents with the management of the magazine. Carbine chose Steinem as the McCall's Woman of the Year in 1972 but the management was concerned that she was too radical and considering re-printing the magazine covers to instead feature Pat Nixon, until Carbine threatened to publicly resign. She also encouraged reporting on issues which were concerning to advertisers. When she asked the management to break her contract in order to join Ms., they agreed.

Carbine was the editor-in-chief of the first independent issue of the magazine in July 1972. She was one of the original shareholders of the magazine, alongside Steinem, Harris and Warner Communications. She was a founder and director of the Ms. Foundation for Women, Inc. and the Ms. Foundation for Education and Communications, Inc. The other co-founders of the magazine were Letty Cottin Pogrebin, Nina Finkelstein, Mary Peacock, Margaret Sloan-Hunter and Suzanne Levine. She was responsible for training the female ad sales force for the magazine, although she and Steinem had to make their own calls to the ad agencies in the early days of the magazine. Her decision to hire women in this role was unusual for the time. She also focused on finding advertisers who were not usually associated with women's magazines, including auto manufacturers, financial services and alcoholic beverages.

She was a board member of the Magazine Publishers of America (MPA) between 1973 and 1988, the first woman to serve on the board. She was a member of the board of the Advertising Council, where she was the first female chair, and a member of the American Society of Magazine Editors. Carbine successfully persuaded the MPA not to hold the annual conference in Florida, due to the state's importance in the campaign to ratify the Equal Rights Amendment (ERA). She was vocal in criticizing newspapers, including specifically The New York Times, for refusing to use Ms. as a designation.

In 1975, Carbine and Steinem were sued by Harris for $1.7 million for fraudulently misrepresenting the value of the magazine's shares and for forcing her to share her ownership rights, but the case was dismissed.

== Legacy ==
Carbine's papers are held by Smith College.
