= Star of David =

Jewish cultural and religious symbol

Tekhelet colored Star of David, as depicted on the flag of Israel.

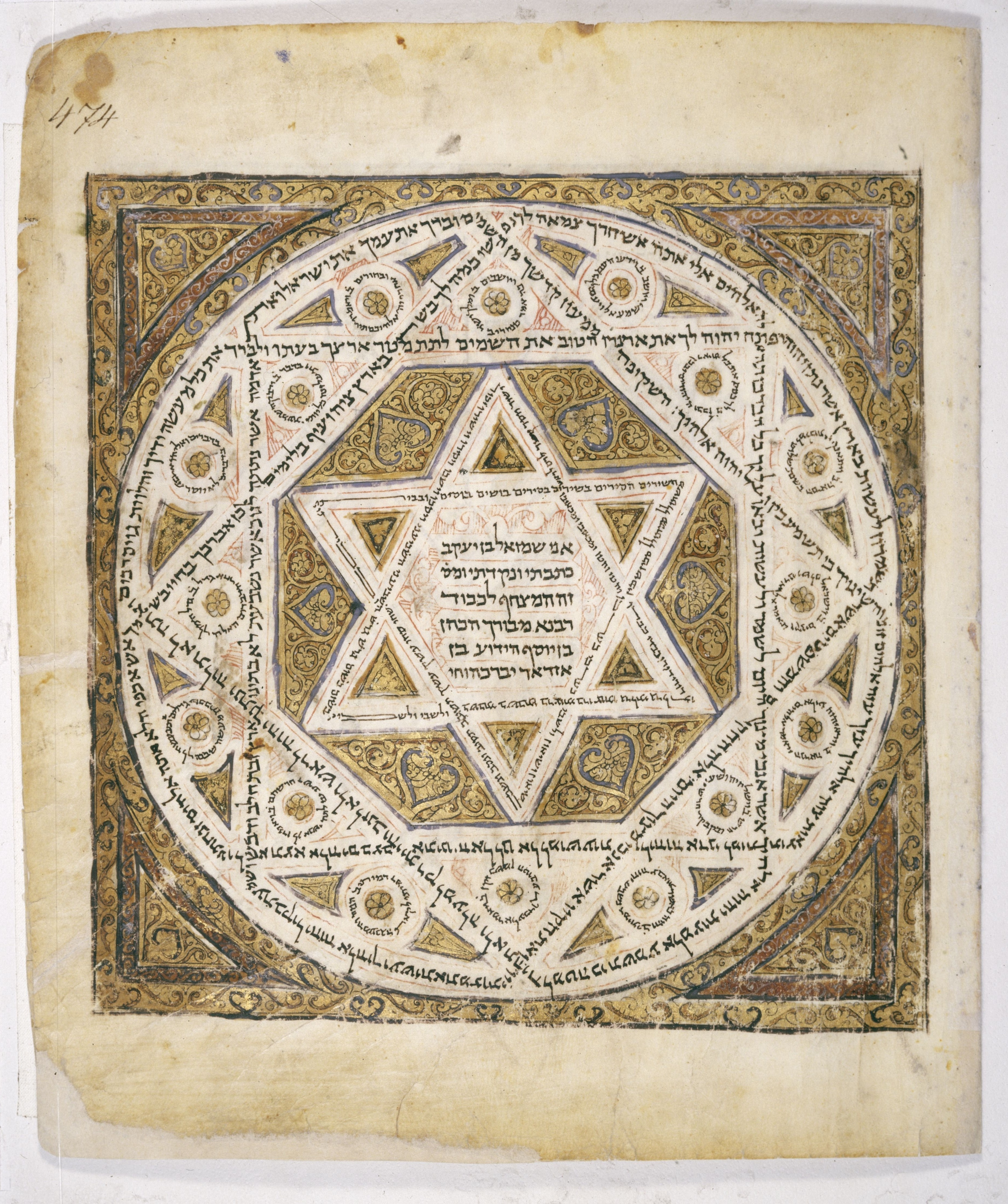
The Star of David featured in the oldest complete copy of the Masoretic Text, the Leningrad Codex, dated 1008.

The Star of David (Hebrew: מָגֵן דָּוִד, romanized: Māḡēn Dāvīḏ, [maˈɡen daˈvid], lit. 'Shield of David') (Note: Biblical Hebrew pronunciation: [maːˈɡeːn daːˈwiːd]; Tiberian pronunciation: [mɔˈɣen dɔˈvið]; Ashkenazi Hebrew and Yiddish: Moge(i)n Dovid; pronunciation: [ˈmɔ.ɡɛ(ɪ̯)n ˈdɔ.vɪd]; Judeo-Spanish: Eskudo de David; pronunciation: [esˈku.do de daˈvid].) is a symbol generally recognized as representing both Jewish identity and the Jewish people's ethnic religion, Judaism. Its shape is that of a hexagram: the compound of two equilateral triangles.

A derivation of the Seal of Solomon was used for decorative and mystical purposes by Kabbalistic Jews and Muslims. The hexagram appears occasionally in Jewish contexts since antiquity as a decorative motif, such as a stone bearing a hexagram from the arch of the 3rd–4th century Khirbet Shura synagogue. A hexagram found in a religious context can be seen in the Leningrad Codex, a manuscript of the Hebrew Bible from 11th-century Cairo.

Its association as a distinctive symbol for the Jewish people and their religion dates to 17th-century Prague. In the 19th century, the symbol began to be widely used by the Jewish communities of Eastern Europe, ultimately coming to represent Jewish identity or religious beliefs. It became representative of Zionism after it was chosen as the central symbol for a Jewish national flag at the First Zionist Congress in 1897.

By the end of World War I, it was an internationally accepted symbol for the Jewish people and used on the gravestones of fallen Jewish soldiers.

The star is the central symbol on the national flag of the State of Israel.

== Roots ==
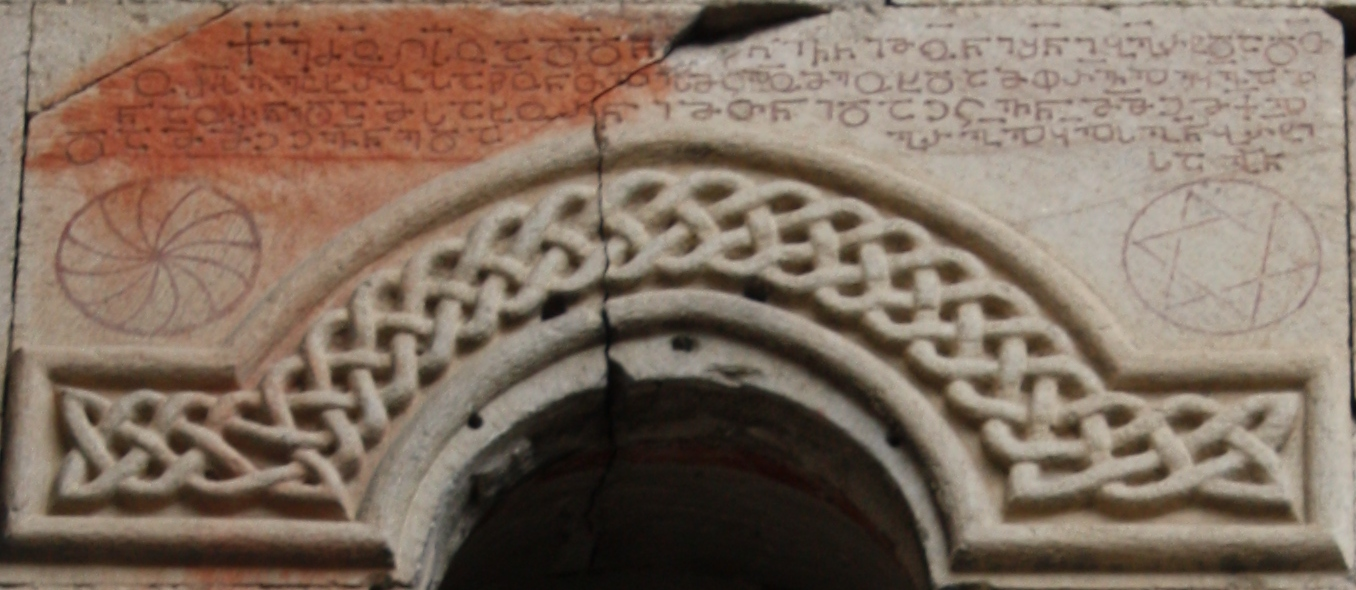
Star of David at the Oshki Monastery, dated CE 973. The monastery is located in Tao, modern-day Turkey.

Unlike the menorah, the Lion of Judah, the shofar and the lulav, the hexagram was not originally a uniquely Jewish symbol. The hexagram, being an inherently simple geometric construction, has been used throughout human history in various motifs which were not exclusively religious. Kabbalah scholar Gershom Scholem noted how the symbol was found on a Jewish seal in Sidon from the 7th-century BCE, and how it was also found alongside other symbols that were known to not be of Jewish origin. It appeared as a decorative motif in both 4th-century synagogues and Christian churches in the Galilee region.

Gershom Scholem writes that the term "seal of Solomon" was adopted by Jews from Islamic magic literature, while he could not assert with certainty whether the term "shield of David" originated in Islamic or Jewish mysticism. Scholem noted how the hexagram star was also found in Hinduism, where it is a symbol of the goddess Lakshmi, and Buddhism, where it is used as a meditation aid to achieve a sense of peace and harmony. Leonora Leet argues though that not just the terminology, but the esoteric philosophy behind it had pre-Islamic Jewish roots. She also shows that Jewish alchemists were the teachers of their Muslim and Christian counterparts, and that a way-opener such as Maria Hebraea of Alexandria (2nd or 3rd century CE; others date her earlier) already used concepts which were later adopted by Muslim and Christian alchemists and could be graphically associated with the symbolism of the upper and lower triangles constituting the hexagram, which came into explicit use after her time. The hexagram however only becomes widespread in Jewish magical texts and amulets (segulot) in the early Middle Ages, which is why most modern authors have seen Islamic mysticism as the source of the medieval Spanish Kabbalists' use of the hexagram. The name "Star of David" originates from King David of ancient Israel.

== Use as Jewish emblem ==
Only around one millennium later, however, did the star begin to be used as a symbol to identify Jewish communities, a tradition that seems to have started in Prague before the 17th century, and from there spread to much of Eastern Europe.

In the 19th century, it came to be adopted by European Jews as a symbol to represent Jewish religion or identity in the same manner the Christian cross identified that religion's believers. The symbol became representative of the worldwide Zionist community after it was chosen as the central symbol on a flag at the First Zionist Congress in 1897, due to its usage in some Jewish communities and its lack of specifically religious connotations. It was not considered an exclusively Jewish symbol until after it began to be used on the gravestones of fallen Jewish soldiers in World War I.

== History of Jewish usage ==
=== Early use as an ornament ===
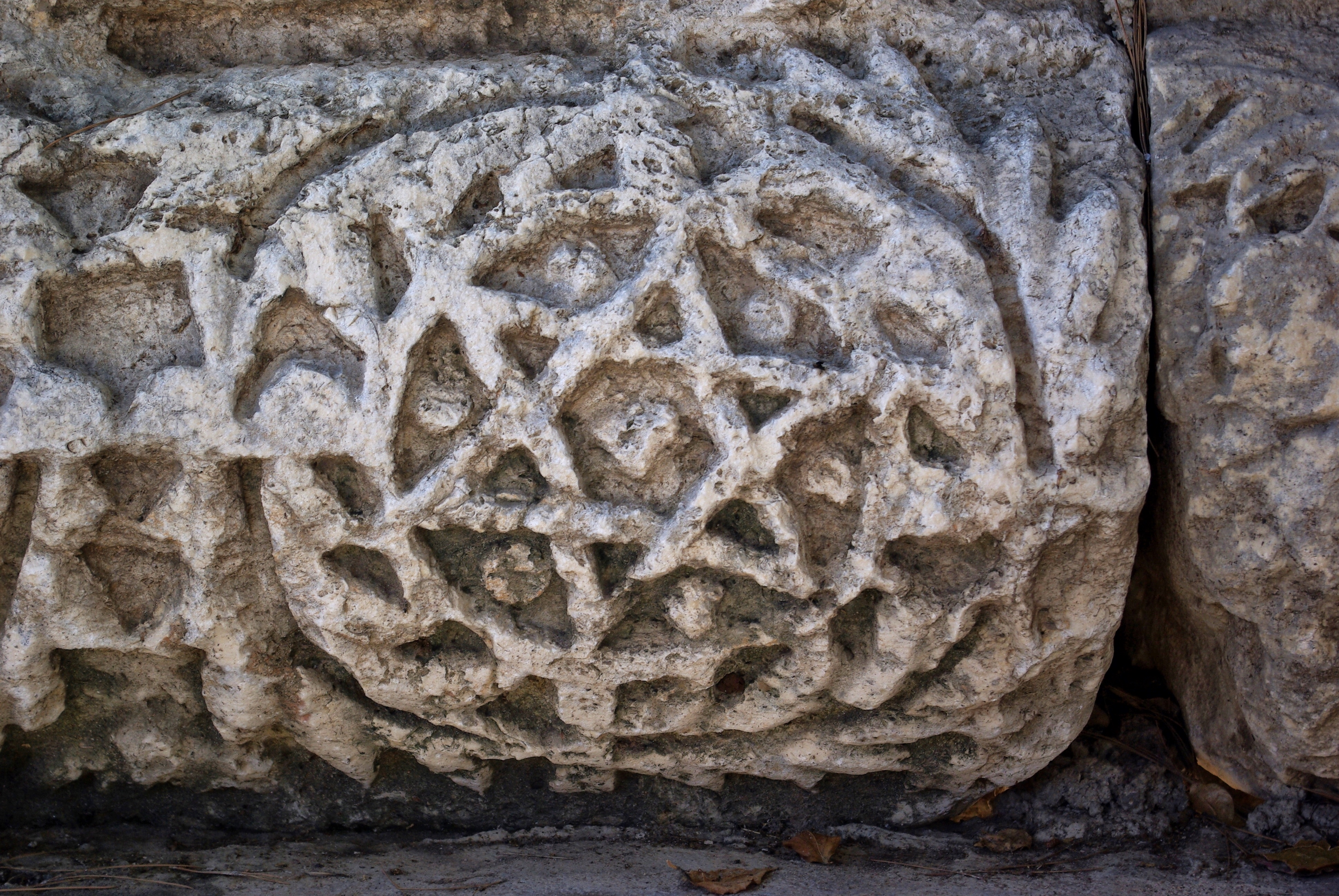
Hexagram in the ancient synagogue at Capernaum

The hexagram does appear occasionally in Jewish contexts since antiquity, apparently as a decorative motif. For example, in Israel, there is a stone bearing a hexagram from the arch of the 3rd–4th century Khirbet Shura synagogue in Galilee. It also appears on a temple on Bar Kokhba Revolt coinage which dates from 135 CE. Originally, the hexagram may have been employed as an architectural ornament on synagogues, as it is, for example, on the cathedrals of Brandenburg and Stendal, and on the Marktkirche at Hanover. A hexagram in this form is found on the ancient synagogue at Capernaum.

The use of the hexagram in a Jewish context as a possibly meaningful symbol may occur as early as the 11th century, in the decoration of the carpet page of the famous Tanakh manuscript, the Leningrad Codex dated 1008. Similarly, the symbol illuminates a medieval Tanakh manuscript dated 1307 belonging to Rabbi Yosef bar Yehuda ben Marvas from Toledo, Spain.

=== Kabbalistic use ===
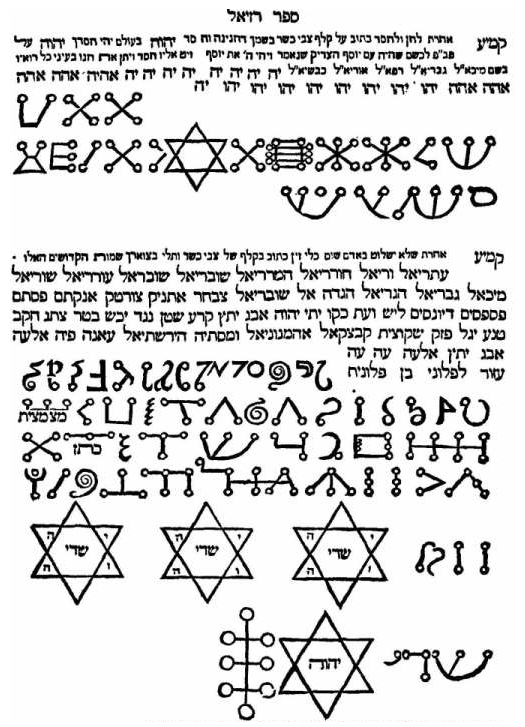
Page of segulot in a medieval Kabbalistic grimoire (Sefer Raziel HaMalakh, 13th century)

A hexagram has been noted on a Jewish tombstone in Taranto, Apulia in Southern Italy, which may date as early as the third century CE. The Jews of Apulia were noted for their scholarship in Kabbalah, which has been connected to the use of the Star of David.

Medieval Kabbalistic grimoires show hexagrams among the tables of segulot, but without identifying them as "Shield of David".

In the Renaissance, in the 16th-century Land of Israel, the book Ets Khayim conveys the Kabbalah of Ha-Ari (Rabbi Isaac Luria) who arranges the traditional items on the seder plate for Passover into two triangles, where they explicitly correspond to Jewish mystical concepts. The six sfirot of the masculine Zer Anpin correspond to the six items on the seder plate, while the seventh sfira being the feminine Malkhut corresponds to the plate itself.

However, these seder-plate triangles are parallel, one above the other, and do not actually form a hexagram.

According to G. S. Oegema (1996):

Isaac Luria provided the hexagram with a further mystical meaning. In his book Etz Chayim he teaches that the elements of the plate for the Seder evening have to be placed in the order of the hexagram: above the three sefirot "Crown", "Wisdom", and "Insight", below the other seven.

Similarly, M. Costa wrote that M. Gudemann and other researchers in the 1920s claimed that Isaac Luria was influential in turning the Star of David into a national Jewish emblem by teaching that the elements of the plate for the Seder evening have to be placed in the order of the hexagram. Gershom Scholem (1990) disagrees with this view, arguing that Isaac Luria talked about parallel triangles one beneath the other and not about the hexagram.

The Star of David at least since the 20th century remains associated with the number seven and thus with the Menorah, and popular accounts associate it with the six directions of space plus the center (under the influence of the description of space found in the Sefer Yetsira: Up, Down, East, West, South, North, and Center), or the Six Sefirot of the Male (Zeir Anpin) united with the Seventh Sefirot of the Female (Nukva). Some say that one triangle represents the ruling tribe of Judah and the other the former ruling tribe of Benjamin. It is also seen as a dalet and yud, the two letters assigned to Judah. There are 12 Vav, or "men", representing the 12 tribes or patriarchs of Israel.

=== Official usage in Central European communities ===
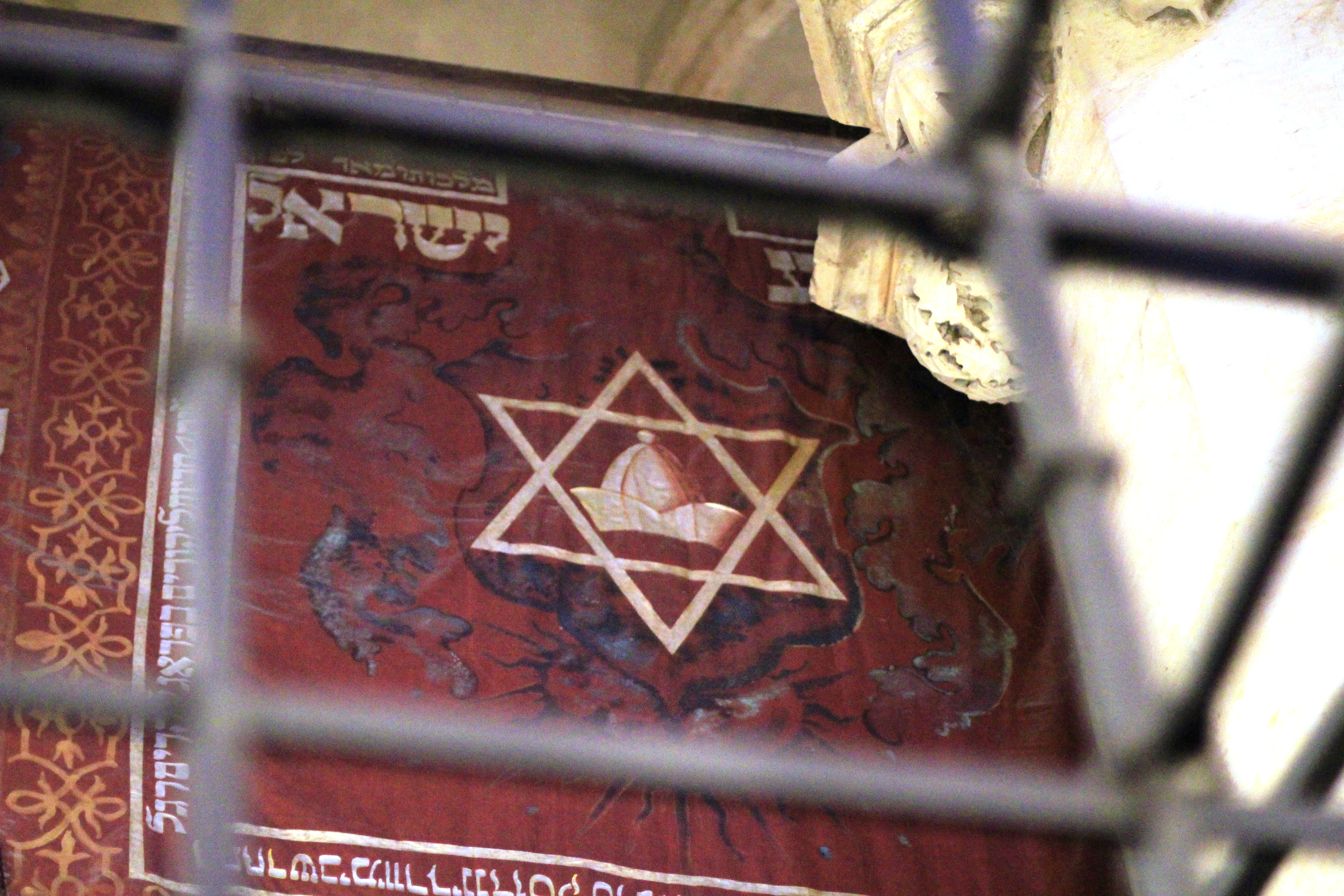
Historical flag of the Jewish community in Prague

In 1354, King of Bohemia Charles IV approved for the Jews of Prague a red flag with a hexagram. In 1460, the Jews of Ofen (Buda, now part of Budapest, Hungary) received King Matthias Corvinus with a red flag on which were two Shields of David and two stars. In the first Hebrew prayer book, printed in Prague in 1512, a large hexagram appears on the cover. In the colophon is written: "Each man beneath his flag according to the house of their fathers...and he will merit to bestow a bountiful gift on anyone who grasps the Shield of David." In 1592, Mordechai Maizel was allowed to affix "a flag of King David, similar to that located on the Main Synagogue" on his synagogue in Prague. Following the Battle of Prague (1648), the Jews of Prague were again granted a flag, in recognition of their contribution to the city's defense. That flag showed a yellow hexagram on a red background, with a "Swedish star" placed in the center of the hexagram.

In the 1650s, the Jews of Vienna adopted a seal with the hexagram on it, likely choosing the motif used on the seal for the Jews of Prague. When a boundary was fixed between Vienna and the Jewish ghetto, a marker was fashioned which separated the two communities. The Christians were identified by the cross and the Jews by the hexagram. When the Jews of Vienna were expelled in 1669, many refugees fled to other cities which in turn used the symbol for their community seal.

=== As a symbol of Judaism and the Jewish community ===
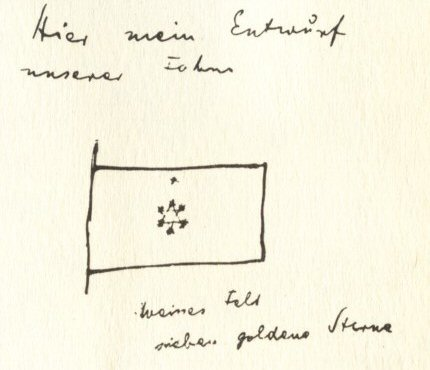
Herzl's proposed flag, as sketched in his diaries. Although he drew a Star of David, he did not describe it as such

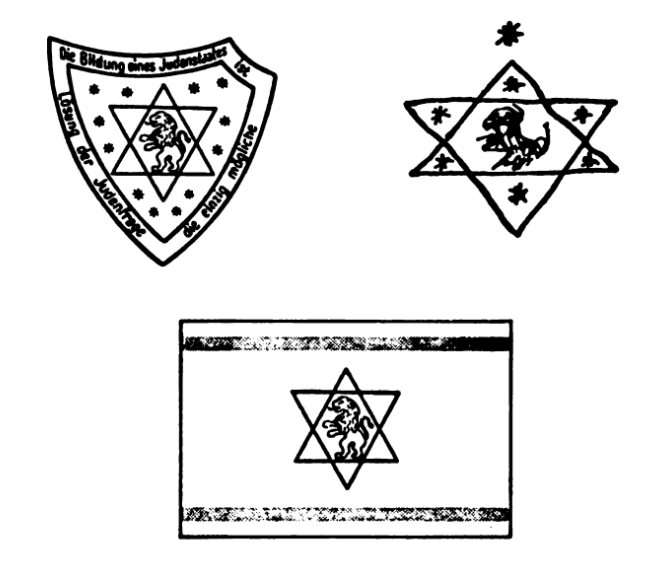
Max Bodenheimer's (top left) and Herzl's (top right) 1897 drafts of the Zionist flag, compared to the final version used at the 1897 First Zionist Congress (bottom)

The early proto-Zionist Hibbat Zion societies used the Star of David it as a national emblem, although Herzl was not aware of this. The symbol became representative of the worldwide Zionist community, and later the broader Jewish community, after it was chosen to represent the First Zionist Congress in 1897.

A year before the congress, Herzl had written in his 1896 Der Judenstaat:

We have no flag, and we need one. If we desire to lead many men, we must raise a symbol above their heads. I would suggest a white flag, with seven golden stars. The white field symbolizes our pure new life; the stars are the seven golden hours of our working-day. For we shall march into the Promised Land carrying the badge of honor.

David Wolffsohn (1856–1914), a businessman prominent in the early Zionist movement, was aware that the nascent Zionist movement had no official flag, and that the design proposed by Theodor Herzl was gaining no significant support, wrote:

At the behest of our leader Herzl, I came to Basle to make preparations for the Zionist Congress. Among many other problems that occupied me then was one that contained something of the essence of the Jewish problem. What flag would we hang in the Congress Hall? Then an idea struck me. We have a flag—and it is blue and white. The talith (prayer shawl) with which we wrap ourselves when we pray: that is our symbol. Let us take this Talith from its bag and unroll it before the eyes of Israel and the eyes of all nations. So I ordered a blue and white flag with the Shield of David painted upon it. That is how the national flag, that flew over Congress Hall, came into being.

In the early 20th century, the symbol began to be used to express Jewish affiliations in sports. Hakoah Vienna was a Jewish sports club founded in Vienna, Austria, in 1909 whose teams competed with the Star of David on the chest of their uniforms, and won the 1925 Austrian League soccer championship. Similarly, The Philadelphia Sphas basketball team in Philadelphia (whose name was an acronym of its founding South Philadelphia Hebrew Association) wore a large Star of David on their jerseys to proudly proclaim their Jewish identity, as they competed in the first half of the 20th century.

In boxing, Benny "the Ghetto Wizard" Leonard (who said he felt as though he was fighting for all Jews) fought with a Star of David embroidered on his trunks in the 1910s. World heavyweight boxing champion Max Baer fought with a Star of David on his trunks as well, notably, for the first time as he knocked out Nazi Germany hero Max Schmeling in 1933; Hitler never permitted Schmeling to fight a Jew again.

=== The Holocaust ===
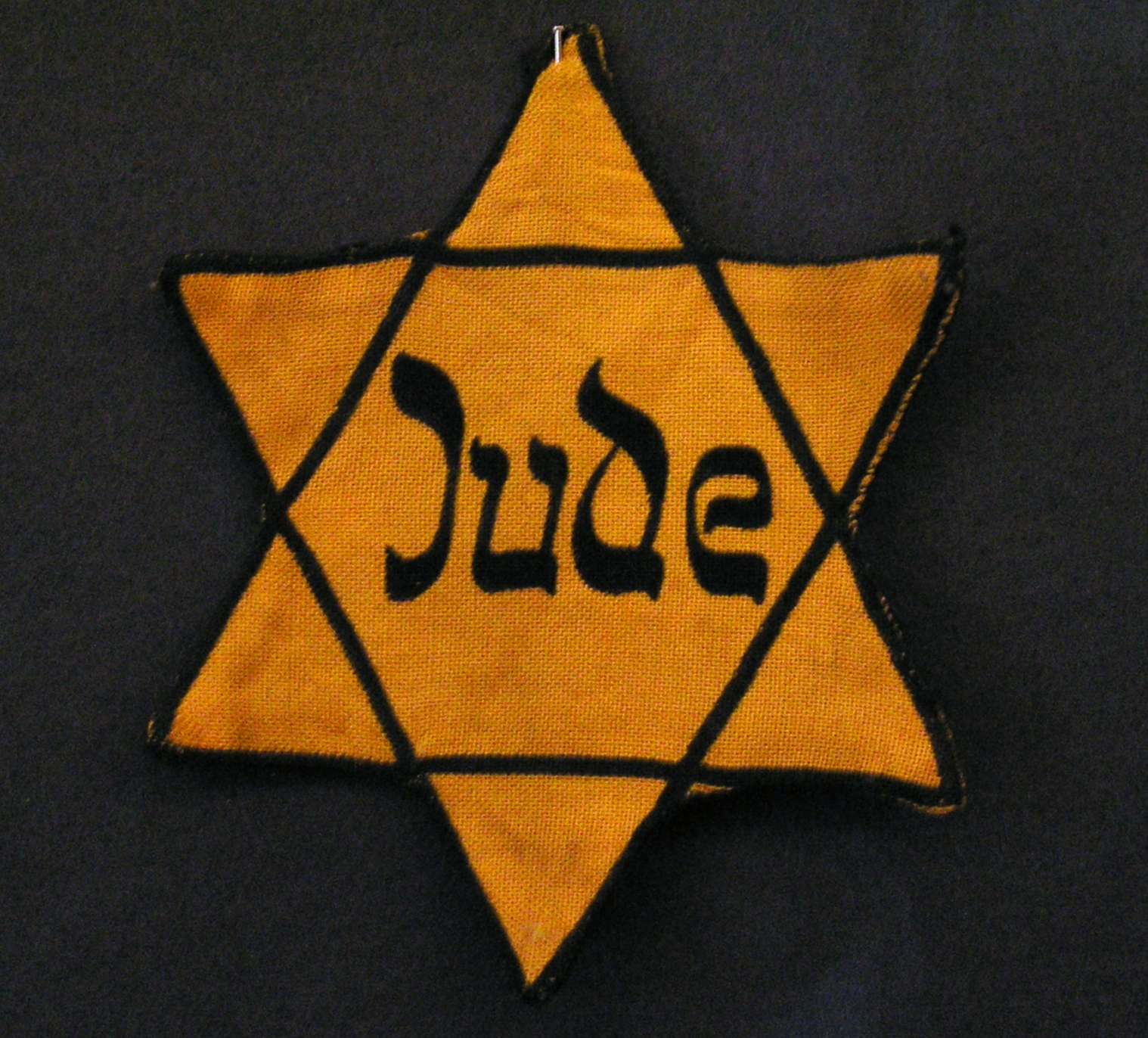
The yellow badge

A Star of David, often yellow, was used by the Nazis during the Holocaust to identify Jews. After the German invasion of Poland in 1939, local German occupation commanders ordered Jewish Poles to wear an identifying mark (e.g. in the General Government, a white armband with a blue Star of David; in the Warthegau, a yellow badge, in the form of a Star of David, on the left breast and on the back). If a Jew was found in public without the star, he could be severely punished. The requirement to wear the Star of David with the word Jude (German for Jew) was then extended to all Jews over the age of six in the Reich and in the Protectorate of Bohemia and Moravia (by a decree issued on September 1, 1941, and signed by Reinhard Heydrich) and was gradually introduced in other Nazi-occupied areas. Others, however, wore the Star of David as a symbol of defiance against Nazi antisemitism, as in the case of United States Army private Hal Baumgarten, who wore a Star of David emblazoned on his back during the 1944 invasion of Normandy.

== Contemporary use ==
The flag of Israel

The flag of Israel, depicting a blue Star of David on a white background, between two horizontal blue stripes was adopted on October 28, 1948, five months after the country's establishment. The origins of the flag's design date from the First Zionist Congress in 1897; the flag has subsequently been known as the "flag of Zion".

Many Modern Orthodox, Conservative, and Reform synagogues have the Israeli flag with the Star of David prominently displayed on the bimah.

Magen David Adom (MDA) ("Red Star of David" or, translated literally, "Red Shield of David") is Israel's only official emergency medical, disaster, and ambulance service. It has been an official member of the International Federation of Red Cross and Red Crescent Societies since June 2006. According to the Israel Ministry of Foreign Affairs, Magen David Adom was boycotted by the International Committee of the Red Cross, which refused to grant the organization membership because "it was [...] argued that having an emblem used by only one country was contrary to the principles of universality." Other commentators said the ICRC did not recognize the medical and humanitarian use of this Jewish symbol, a Red Shield, alongside the Christian cross and the Muslim crescent.

=== Use in sports ===
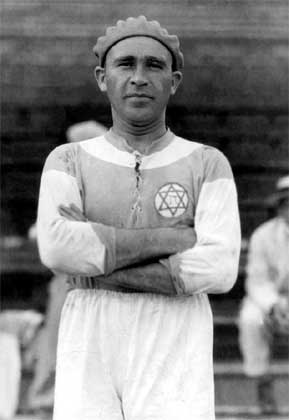
Béla Guttmann, footballer for Hakoah Vienna

Since 1948, the Star of David has carried the dual significance of representing both the state of Israel and Jewish identity in general. In the United States especially, it continues to be used in the latter sense by a number of athletes.

In baseball, Jewish major leaguer Gabe Kapler had a Star of David tattooed on his left calf in 2000, with the words "strong-willed" and "strong-minded", major leaguer Mike "Superjew" Epstein drew a Star of David on his baseball glove, and major leaguer Ron Blomberg had a Star of David emblazoned in the knob of his bat which is on display at the Baseball Hall of Fame.

NBA basketball star Amar'e Stoudemire, who says he is spiritually and culturally Jewish, had a Star of David tattoo put on his left hand in 2010. NFL football defensive end Igor Olshansky has Star of David tattoos on each side of his neck, near his shoulders. Israeli golfer Laetitia Beck displays a blue-and-white Magen David symbol on her golf apparel.

In boxing, Jewish light heavyweight world champion Mike "The Jewish Bomber" Rossman fought with a Star of David embroidered on his boxing trunks, and also has a blue Star of David tattoo on the outside of his right calf.

Other boxers fought with Stars of David embroidered on their trunks include world lightweight champion, world light heavyweight boxing champion Battling Levinsky, Barney Ross (world champion as a lightweight, as a junior welterweight, and as a welterweight), world flyweight boxing champion Victor "Young" Peres, world bantamweight champion Alphonse Halimi, and more recently World Boxing Association super welterweight champion Yuri Foreman, light welterweight champion Cletus Seldin, and light middleweight Boyd Melson. Welterweight Zachary "Kid Yamaka" Wohlman has a tattoo of a Star of David across his stomach, and welterweight Dmitriy Salita even boxes under the nickname "Star of David".

Maccabi clubs still use the Star of David in their emblems.

== Etymology ==
The Jewish Encyclopedia cites a 12th-century Karaite document as the earliest Jewish literary source to mention a symbol called "Magen Dawid" (without specifying its shape).

The name 'Shield of David' was used by at least the 11th century as a title of the God of Israel, independent of the use of the symbol. The phrase occurs independently as a divine title in the Siddur, the traditional Jewish prayer book, where it poetically refers to the divine protection of ancient King David and the anticipated restoration of his dynastic house, perhaps based on Psalm 18, which is attributed to David, and in which God is compared to a shield (v. 31 and v. 36). The term occurs at the end of the "Samkhaynu/Gladden us" blessing, which is recited after the reading of the Haftara portion on Saturday and holidays.

The earliest known text related to Judaism which mentions a sign called the "Shield of David" is Eshkol Ha-Kofer by the Karaite Judah Hadassi, in the mid-12th century CE:

Seven names of angels precede the mezuzah: Michael, Gabriel, etc. ...Tetragrammaton protect you! And likewise the sign, called the "Shield of David", is placed beside the name of each angel.

This book is of Karaite, and not of Rabbinic Jewish origin, and it does not describe the shape of the sign in any way.

== Miscellaneous ==
- In Unicode, the "Star of David" symbol is U+2721 (✡︎).
- Some criminal gangs, including the Gangster Disciples and those affiliated with the Folk Nation, use the Star of David as their symbol. In the case of the Gangster Disciples this is a reference to the group's founder, David Barksdale, also known as "King David".
- The insignia of the Trinidad and Tobago Police Service has included a hexagram since the end of the 19th century.

== Gallery ==
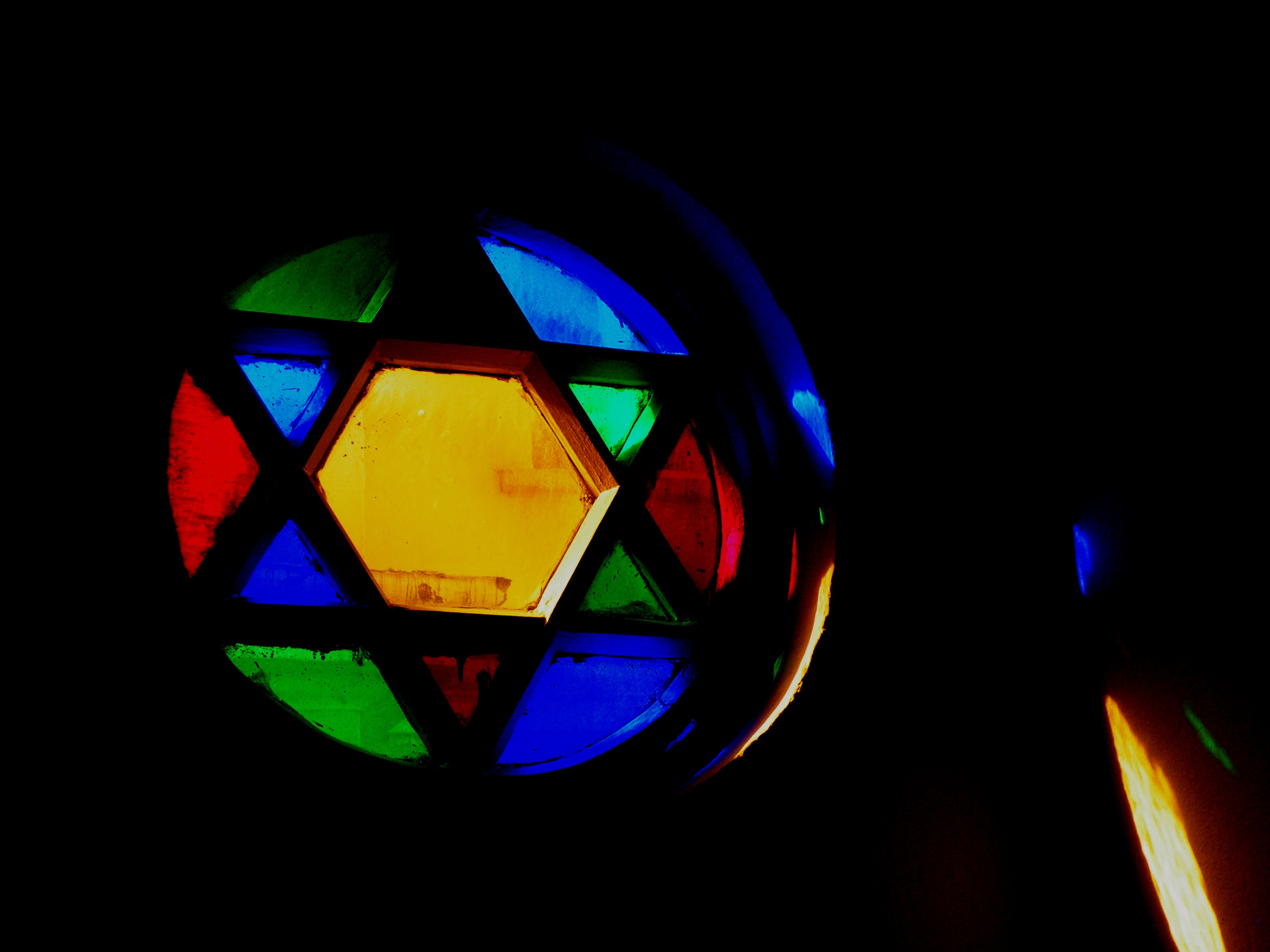
Star in the Schneider Synagogue, Istanbul

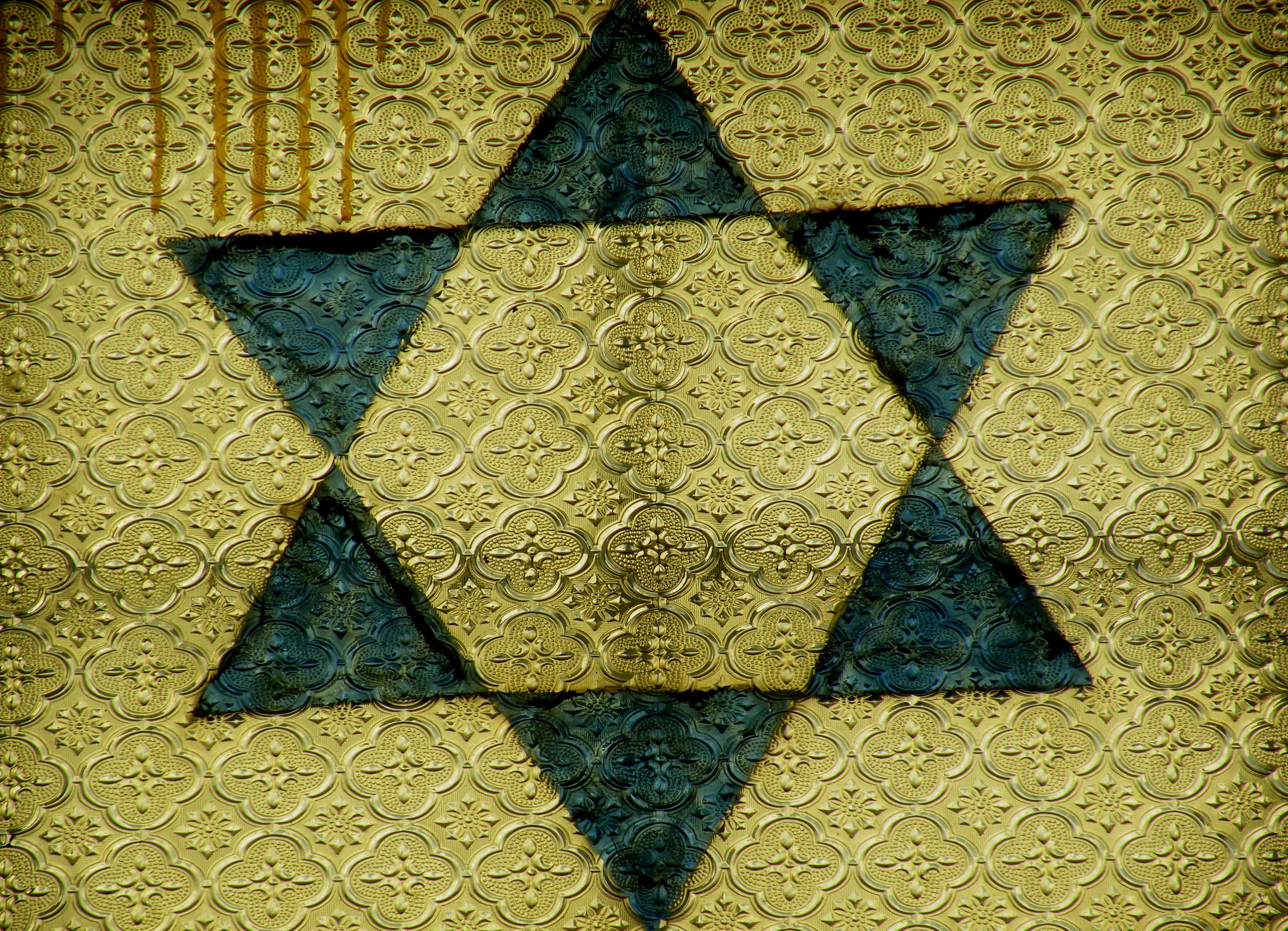
Star in the Ari Ashkenazi Synagogue, Safed

The Magen David Adom emblem

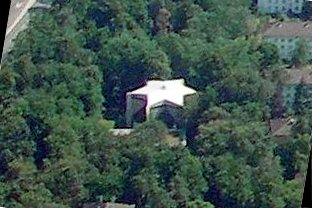
A synagogue in Karlsruhe, Germany, with the outline of a Star of David

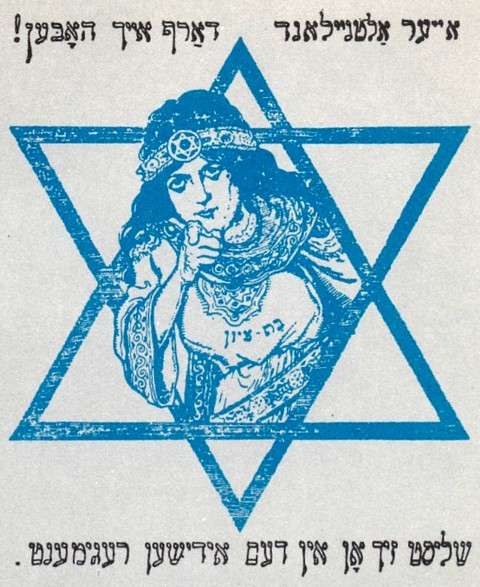
A recruitment poster published in American Jewish magazines during WWI. Daughter of Zion (representing the Jewish people): Your Old New Land must have you! Join the Jewish regiment.

Roundel displayed on Israeli Air Force aircraft, 1948–present

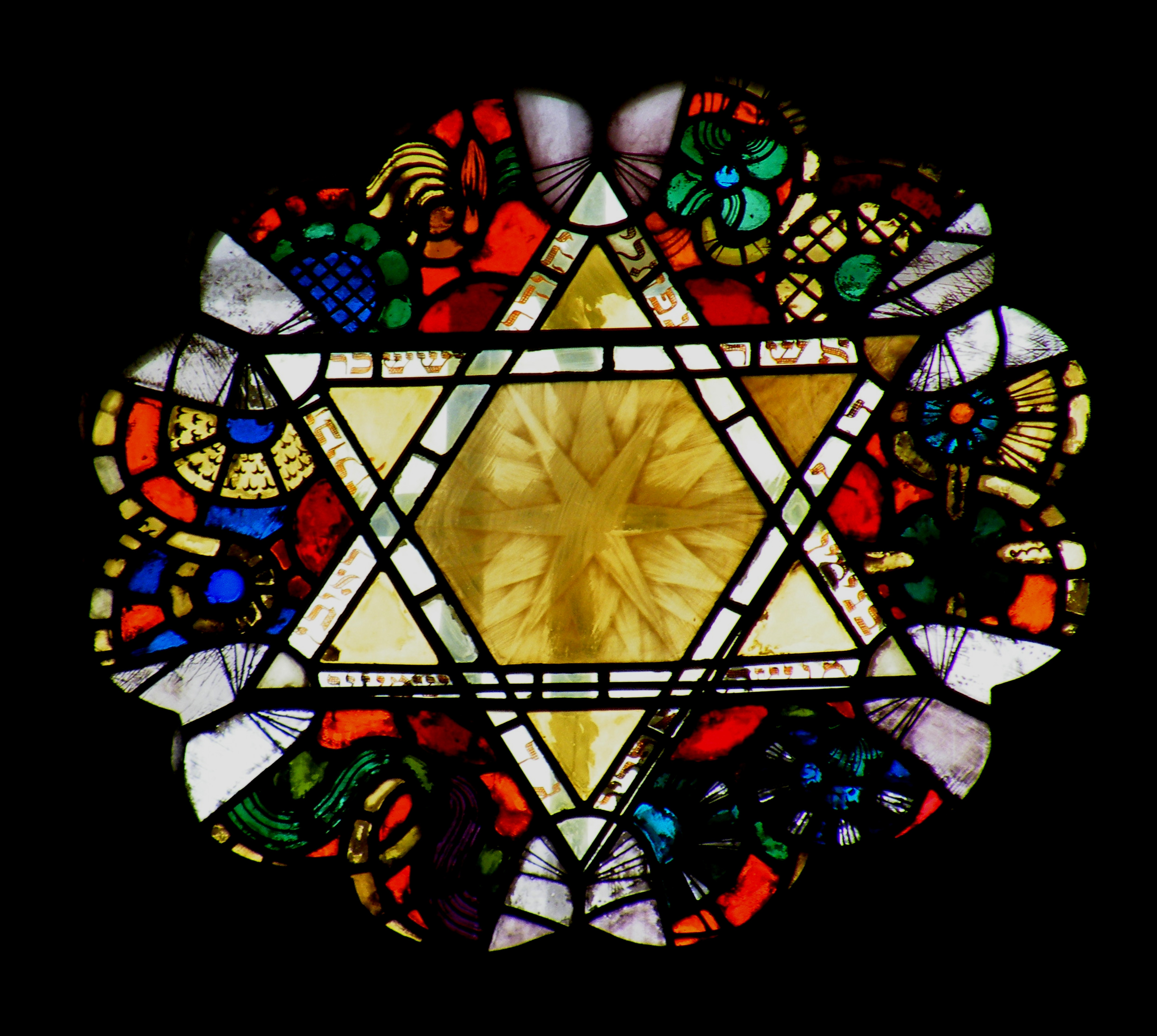
Stained glass Star of David

USVA headstone emblem 3

== See also ==
- Anahata
- Chai symbol
- G2 (mathematics)
- Merkaba
- Shatkona, an identical Hindu symbol
- Kagome crest, an identical Japanese symbol
- Star of Bethlehem
- Star of David theorem
- Star of Lakshmi
- Stars of David: Prominent Jews Talk About Being Jewish, 2005 book
- Unicursal hexagram
- Zoigl, a make of German beer which uses ✡︎ as its symbol
- Seal of Solomon

== Bibliography ==
- "The Flag and the Emblem". Israel Ministry of Foreign Affairs (MFA). Archived from the original on May 13, 2019.
- Berlin, Adele, ed. (2011). "Magen David". The Oxford Dictionary of the Jewish Religion (2nd ed.). Oxford University Press. p. 463. ISBN 9780199730049.
- Reuveni, Gideon (2017). Consumer Culture and the Making of Modern Jewish Identity. Cambridge University Press. p. 43. ISBN 9781107011304.
- Scholem, Gershom (1949). "The Curious History of the Six-Pointed Star. How the "Magen David" Became the Jewish Symbol" (PDF). Commentary. Vol. 8. pp. 243–251. Archived from the original (PDF) on June 30, 2014.
- Silverman, B.P. Robert Stephen (2007). The Big Book of Jewish Sports Heroes. New York, NY: S.P.I. Books. ISBN 9781561719075.
