= Abigail Pogrebin =

American journalist

- Born: May 17, 1965 (age 61); New York City, U.S.
- Occupation: Writer
- Parent(s): Letty Cottin Pogrebin; Bert Pogrebin
- Family: Robin Pogrebin (sister)

Abigail Pogrebin (born May 17, 1965) is an American writer, journalist, podcast host for Tablet magazine, and former Director of Jewish Outreach for the Michael Bloomberg 2020 presidential campaign.

== Family and early life ==
Pogrebin was born in New York to a Jewish family, the daughter of an author and feminist activist Letty Cottin Pogrebin, the co-founder of Ms. magazine, and Bert Pogrebin, a management-side labor lawyer, and is the identical twin sister of New York Times journalist Robin Pogrebin. At 16, she was the youngest member of the original Broadway cast of Hal Prince’s production of Stephen Sondheim's musical Merrily We Roll Along, which closed in November 1981 after 44 previews and only 16 performances. She graduated summa cum laude from Yale University.

Pogrebin married David Shapiro in 1993, and they have two children.

Pogrebin's sister-in-law, Alina Arenal (married to brother David Pogrebin in 1998), also had a career at a Times-related entity, the New York Times Foundation.

== Career ==
After graduating from Yale in 1987, Pogrebin became a broadcast producer for Mike Wallace, Charlie Rose and associate producer for Ed Bradley at 60 Minutes and Bill Moyers at PBS and before that for The MacNeil/Lehrer Report and Fred W. Friendly. Afterwards she turned to freelance journalism and published articles in magazines and newspapers like Newsweek, New York Magazine, The Forward, Tablet, and The Daily Beast.

She has moderated conversations for The Jewish Community Center in Manhattan (JCC), the Streicker Center, UJA Federation, and the Shalom Hartman Institute.

Pogrebin is the author of My Jewish Year: 18 Holidays, One Wondering Jew, published in 2017, which was a finalist for the 2018 National Jewish Book Award, and the 2005 book Stars of David: Prominent Jews Talk About Being Jewish, for which she interviewed 62 famous American Jews, — from Ruth Bader Ginsburg to Steven Spielberg — about their religious identity. Her second book, One and the Same: My Life As an Identical Twin and What I’ve Learned About Everyone’s Struggle to Be Singular, was published in October 2009. Her 2011 book Showstopper documents her time in the cast of Stephen Sondheim’s musical “Merrily We Roll Along,” and Pogrebin is featured in the 2016 Netflix documentary film by director Lonny Price, Best Worst Thing That Ever Could Have Happened. She is also co-author of It Takes Two To Torah: An Orthodox Rabbi and Reform Journalist Discuss and Debate Their Way Through the Five Books of Moses, written with Rabbi Dov Linzer in 2024.

She served as the president of New York's Central Synagogue from 2015-2018, and in November 2019 she joined former New York City mayor Michael Bloomberg’s presidential campaign as the Director of Jewish Outreach.

Tablet Magazine’s podcast, “Parsha in Progress” features a regular Torah discussion with Pogrebin and Rabbi Dov Linzer, who is the president of Yeshivat Chovevei Torah. Pogrebin moderated and wrote the Tablet Magazine series, “The Minyan,” which zeroes in on one aspect of Jewish life through the voices of those who live it. She has written about antisemitism in The Atlantic and the Jewish New Year in Vogue. Her most recent opinion piece on Hanukkah appeared in The New York Times.

== Awards ==
Pogrebin received the “Impact Award” from the JCC in Manhattan, and the “Community Leader Award” from The Jewish Week in 2017. Her 2017 book My Jewish Year: 18 Holidays, One Wondering Jew was a finalist for the 2017 National Jewish Book Award in the Contemporary Jewish Life and Practice category. In 2025, she and Rabbi Dov Linzer won the Independent Press Award in Religion Nonfiction for their co-authored book, It Takes Two to Torah.

She received the second place award for the 2021 Excellence in Enterprise Religion Reporting from The Religion News Association and received an honorable mention in the category of for Excellence in Special Sections or Supplements from The Jewish Press Association’s Rockower Awards in 2021 for her series in The Forward, “Still Small Voice: 18 Questions about God,” which asked 18 clergy and scholars about their own faith.
