= Elizabeth Forsling Harris =

American journalist

Elizabeth Forsling Harris (born Mary Elizabeth Forsling) was a journalist, public relations professional, and the first publisher of the feminist magazine Ms.

== Early life and education ==
Harris was from Tennessee. She graduated from Mount Vernon College in Washington, DC.

== Career ==
=== Early years ===
Harris worked as a journalist for Newsweek magazine from 1947 to 1951. From 1951 to 1953, she was a television producer for ABC-TV in New York, after which she founded a public relations firm in Dallas, Texas.

Harris worked for the Peace Corps from 1961 to 1963 and was active in politics. She worked on the campaigns of Lyndon B. Johnson, Sam Rayburn, and John F. Kennedy.

=== Kennedy's Dallas visit ===
Betty received a call in November 1963 while living in Dallas. It was from Bill Moyers, whom she knew through the Kennedy White House's initiative on the Peace Corps. Moyers, a baptist preacher from Texas, had been Lyndon Johnson's top aide for his 1960 bid for the presidency. President John F. Kennedy had put Bill Moyers in charge of his Dallas trip.

Moyers had a difficult assignment to pass along to Harris: "unraveling the political snarl that pertained to [...] Kennedy's planned trip" to Dallas. Betty Harris became the reluctant "point man" for Kennedy and Johnson's Dallas trip scheduled for November 22, 1963. Time was extremely short; there was just about a week to plan everything.

The late assignment was because two others had apparently been unable to liaise between the Kennedy team and Sam Bloom, the person speaking for the group of influential men in Dallas who were organizing the events there. Jacob "Jack" L. Puterbaugh of Minnesota was one of them in his capacity as an aide to the head of Kennedy's Department of Agriculture, Orville Freeman. Puterbaugh had done advance work for a Kennedy trip to Duluth two months earlier, but was not aware of Dallas politics. Jerry Bruno had been another liaison to Dallas and Sam Bloom. And Bill Moyers himself had his own difficulties with the Dallas political scene, being a young and inexperienced Austin man. Harris stepped in at the last minute to straighten out the preparations.

Harris determined the issues at hand on the eve of President Kennedy's trip to Dallas:

[...] the basic problem was, very simply, that the conservative Democrats, who were the City Fathers, didn't want to do anything for the liberal Democrats, who were then led by Ralph Yarborough as the incumbent Senator, and the two groups were fighting over the distribution of tickets; less important was the -- less open fighting about the amount of publicity that was going to be given to the --- the liberals wanted some publicity to turn out the crowds. They wanted big crowds for political reasons. They wanted it to look like Kennedy was terribly popular in Dallas, and the conservatives wanted a poor crowd, because that would look like he wasn't very popular in Dallas.

Betty Harris thus needed to deal with the local planning organization overseen by Sam Bloom of the Bloom Agency who had run off three of Kennedy's advance men for their naivety. Bloom was against the publicizing of the motorcade route, which made Harris and the Kennedy team livid. Bloom appeared to be a "Connally person," as was Bob Strauss, Governor Connally's appointee to the Texas Banking Commission. Bloom, Harris, Governor Connally, Strauss, and Secret Service Agent Winston Lawson met over several details of the trip.

In 1978, Harris testified in a closed deposition to the United States House Select Committee on Assassinations of the preparations, phone calls, and arguments she had establishing the route that the Kennedy motorcade would take through Dallas. It was Betty Harris who fought to have the motorcade go through downtown on the way to the Dallas Trade Mart. She also steered the luncheon to the Trade Mart rather than a place on the Texas State Fairgrounds. Fair Park was seen as much too far for security and timing concerns; the route through downtown was preferable because of the crowds it would surely attract on lunch hour.

Choosing the route was so difficult that it wasn't resolved until the Wednesday before the President's Friday arrival. The conservatives whom she was fighting against (Governor Connally's aides and Conservative Dallas Democrats) had wanted to wait until Friday morning to release the motorcade route. Harris testified that Bloom was representing a group of Dallas businessmen, "most of whom are opposed to Kennedy's coming." Harris fought hard to have the motorcade route made public early to increase the turnout and help President Kennedy's image in the conservative city. This initiative succeeded, and Sam Bloom sent the details to the Dallas Times Herald for their evening edition. The Dallas Morning News would obtain the route for their Thursday edition.

On November 22, Betty rode on the same bus as Evelyn Lincoln and other mid-level presidential aides in the motorcade through Dallas. The route was the same as published in the newspapers: a brief stop at the airport, then to Main Street and on to the Trade Mart for lunch. When Johnson's airplane arrived at Dallas Love Field, she demanded that Special Agent in Charge Forrest Sorrels have the bubble top removed from the SS-100-X limousine to allow better viewing of the President. This had been directed specifically by Bill Moyers, and likely Kennedy himself. After the President arrived, Harris directed everyone into their vehicles.

As the motorcade approached Elm Street, the people in Harris's bus noticed that the Kennedy limousine accelerated away after the assassination of John F. Kennedy. As they passed through Dealey Plaza, Betty noticed a portly police captain running and people scrambling to the Grassy Knoll. By the time the bus arrived at the Trade Mart, news of the assassination had reached them. Harris and the Kennedy aides went to Parkland Hospital in a state trooper's patrol car.

Harris also testified that she knew George de Mohrenschildt, although her ex-husband knew him better. She was also informed of the secret location of Marina Oswald after the assassination, The Inn of the Six Flags, because she knew people in the Great Southwest Corporation and the lawyer who ended up involved with Oswald.

She worked for the Democratic National Committee thereafter.

=== Publisher ===
In 1971, Harris co-founded Ms. magazine with Gloria Steinem and Patricia Carbine and became its first publisher. She sold her stock back to the company in 1972, then sued them for $1.7 million in 1975. Harris launched Working Woman magazine in 1976.

Betty was to write a biography of Gloria Steinham, but the publisher cancelled its plans in 1990. She was going to discuss Steinem's ties to the CIA in 1959 and 1961.

== Personal life ==
Harris married and divorced Leon Harris, the grandson of the founder of the A. Harris and Company department store. Leon and his cousin were executives for A. Harris and Company before selling it to Federated Department Stores in 1961. It was merged with former rival store Sanger Brothers Dry Goods Company of Dallas (Sanger's), becoming Sanger Harris.

== Death ==
Harris died of chronic obstructive pulmonary disease on July 14, 1999.
