= Kenneth Cole (designer) =

American clothing designer (born 1954)

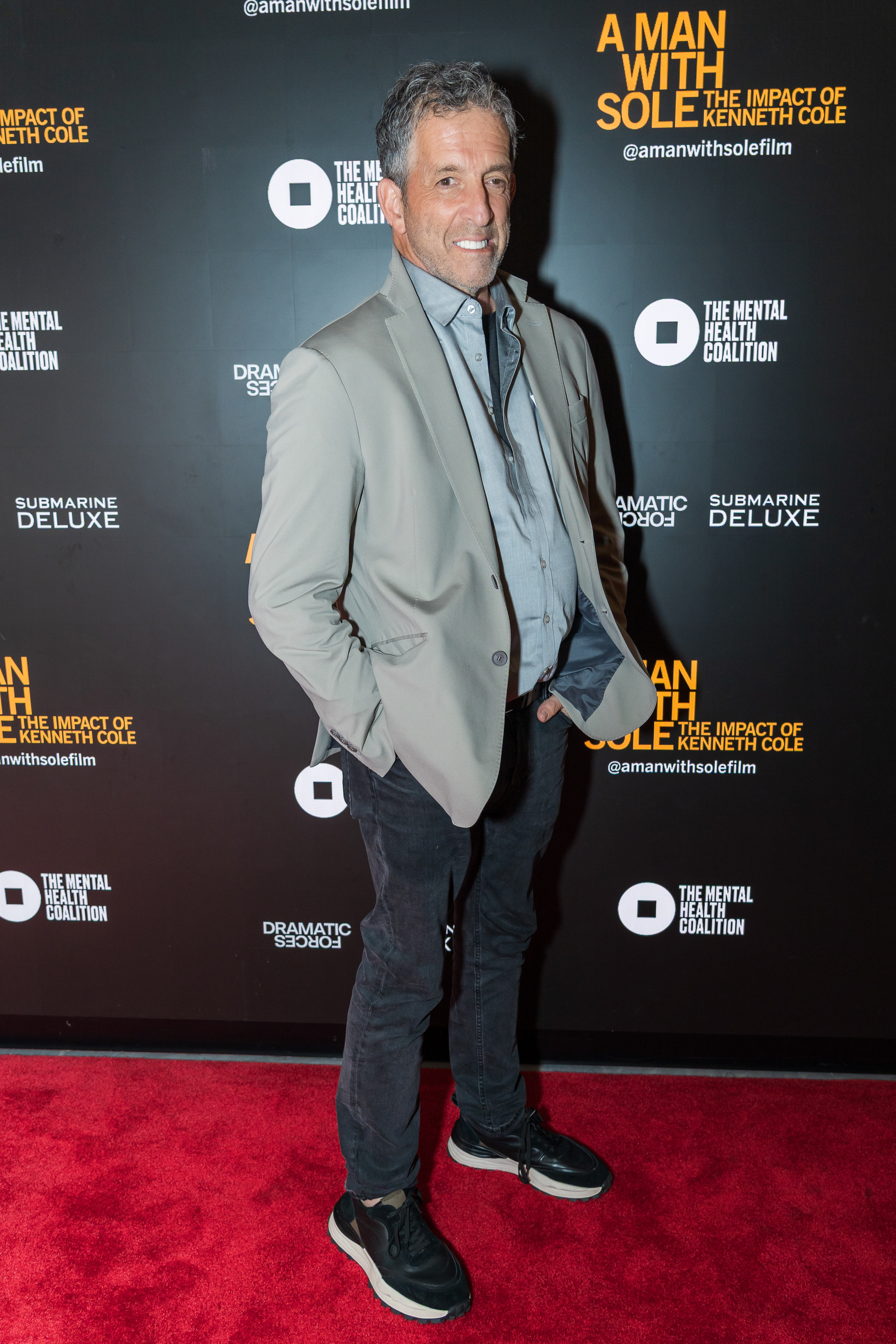
- Kenneth Cole attends “A Man With Sole: The Impact of Kenneth Cole”
- Born: March 23, 1954 (age 72); Brooklyn, New York City, U.S.
- Education: Emory University (BA)
- Occupation: Fashion designer
- Label: Kenneth Cole Productions
- Spouse: Maria Cuomo (m. 1987)
- Children: 3
- Website: kennethcole.com

Kenneth D. Cole (born March 23, 1954) is an American designer, social activist, business owner, and philanthropist. His global company, Kenneth Cole Productions, creates clothing and other products under the labels Kenneth Cole New York, Reaction Kenneth Cole, and Unlisted, as well as footwear under the label Gentle Souls.

== Early life and education ==
Born to a Jewish family in Brooklyn, New York City, his father, Charles Cole, owned the El Greco shoe manufacturing company. In 1970, Cole worked as a peanut vendor at Shea Stadium in Queens. Cole graduated from John L. Miller Great Neck North High School in 1972. Before learning the family business, Cole graduated from Emory College of Arts and Sciences of Emory University in 1976. From 1976 to 1982 he was head of design and sales at El Greco.

== Career ==
Kenneth Cole Productions, Inc. is an American fashion house founded in 1982 by Cole. Wanting to preview his line of shoes at the New York Shoe Expo at the New York Hilton, but unable to afford the purchase of a hotel room or showroom to display his items, Cole inquired about parking a trailer two blocks from the Hilton Hotel. Upon discovering that permits for trailers were only granted to utility and production companies, Cole changed the name of his company from Kenneth Cole Incorporated to Kenneth Cole Productions, and applied for a permit to film the full-length film The Birth of a Shoe Company. In two and a half days, Kenneth Cole Productions sold 40,000 pairs of shoes, while chronicling the beginning of the company on film.

In 1994, Kenneth Cole Productions went public, and since then it has been included on Forbes annual list of 200 Best Small Companies four times through 2008. Kenneth Cole Productions sells clothing and accessories under the following labels: Kenneth Cole New York, Kenneth Cole Reaction, Unlisted and Gentle Souls. The company’s products are also distributed through department stores, specialty stores, company-owned retail stores, and the internet.

== Support of progressive social causes ==
Since 1985, Kenneth Cole has publicly supported AIDS awareness and research. He is considered the first in the fashion industry to do so. He uses fashion as a medium to promote socially conscious ads to help fight various issues, from AIDS to homelessness. He has donated proceeds to organizations such as Mentoring USA, amfAR, and Rock the Vote. Since 2005, Cole has served as chairman for amfAR. In November 2017, sixty people including prominent AIDS activists signed a demand that Cole step down from his position after a federal investigation for fraud and money laundering was opened. In February 2018, Cole stepped down as Chairman after serving more than 30 years on amfAR's board and 14 years as Chairman, amid the controversial Harvey Weinstein deal.

In 2001, the Kenneth Cole Foundation, in association with Cole's alma mater, Emory University, created The Kenneth Cole Fellows in Community Building and Social Change Program at Emory University.

Cole's socially conscious advertising for the causes that he champions has created controversies. One such example was his campaign for World AIDS Day in 2005. He designed T-shirts for the campaign which were sold at such stores as Barneys New York, Scoop, and Louis Boston. The messages on the shirts stated either, "We All Have AIDS" or "I Have AIDS." Cole created the shirts in hopes that those with or without AIDS would wear the shirts, to help diminish the stigma attached to the disease. He said, "There is a legend of the Danish king, Christian X, who, during World War II, when Hitler insisted all Jews publicly wear a yellow Star of David, would wear the star himself, hence making it difficult to differentiate who was Jewish. This is kind of like that, hopefully."

In August 2006, it was announced that Kenneth Cole Productions would stop selling fur in all of their garments for the Fall 2007 Fashion Season. In October 2007, Cole guest-starred in the Ugly Betty episode Betty's Wait Problem.

In the summer of 2007, Kenneth Cole Productions also began their "Awearness" Campaign, which will produce a line of T-shirts to benefit the charities that the company supports, with proceeds going to the Awearness Fund. The campaign is further promoted by a book "Awearness: Inspiring Stories About How to Make a Difference" featuring celebrities assisting various causes.

On May 1, 2009, Cole delivered Northeastern University's keynote address at the school's commencement ceremony.

In July 2023, Cole co-hosted an event entitled "We the Future" alongside Deepak Chopra. It explored the future of AI, and supported guiding AI from the outset to create positive disruption and to on a worldwide basis establish peace as the cornerstone of innovation. It featured as speakers actor Alex Garfin on AI for entertainment, real estate investor Craig Hatkoff on AI's application to innovation, disability rights activist Eddie Ndopu on AI and accessibility, astronaut Sian Proctor on AI and space, record producer Jerry Wonda on AI and music, and model and actress Gabriella Wright on AI and well-being.

== Awards ==
In 1998, People Magazine voted Cole as "Sexiest Businessman of the Year."

On May 14, 2009, the Legal Aid Society of New York City honored Kenneth Cole with its inaugural Theodore Roosevelt Corporate Award at the Waldorf Astoria during its Servant of Justice Award Dinner. Proceeds went to benefit struggling New Yorkers living in poverty. In November 2011, Cole was honored by the Ride of Fame and a double-decker tour bus was dedicated to him in New York City.

In 2011 and 2019, Footwear News named Cole Icon for Social Impact. In 2016, Cole received the UNAIDS International Goodwill Ambassador award. In 2017, Cole received the CFDA Swarovski Award for Positive Change.

In 2020, Cole received the Person of the Year Award from the American Apparel and Footwear Association, as well as the Visionary Change Maker Award from the American Foundation for Suicide Prevention Child Mind. In 2022, Cole received the Suicide Prevention Champion Award from the American Foundation for Suicide Prevention Child Mind.

== Controversies ==
On February 3, 2011, Cole posted an update on Twitter that referenced the 2011 Egyptian protests. The tweet, which indicated that Cole himself wrote the entry, said: "Millions are in uproar in #Cairo. Rumor is they heard our new spring collection is now available online at (website address) -KC". After outrage and much parody on the microblogging site and on the web in general, Cole deleted the entry and posted a personal apology on Facebook.

In April 2012, the designer sparked controversy portraying the national debate over education as one that pits "Teachers’ Rights vs. Students' Rights". On the West Side Highway southbound entering New York City, a billboard punned to southbound commuters, ”Shouldn’t Everyone Be Well Red?” On Salon, David Sirota claimed that "Cole's campaign is thinly veiled ideological propaganda, and it comes with myriad problems, not the least of which is the simple fact that almost nobody believes "underperforming teachers" should be protected. That includes the nation's biggest teachers' unions, which have been outspoken in backing "accountability" reforms for teacher tenure. So right off the bat, Cole is constructing a straw man, one that has served over the years to pretend that public employee unions in general and teachers' unions specifically are about nothing more than making sure bad employees get to keep their jobs." In response to negative outcry, his company announced on Twitter, "We misrepresented the issue—one too complex for a billboard—and are taking it down."

== Personal life ==
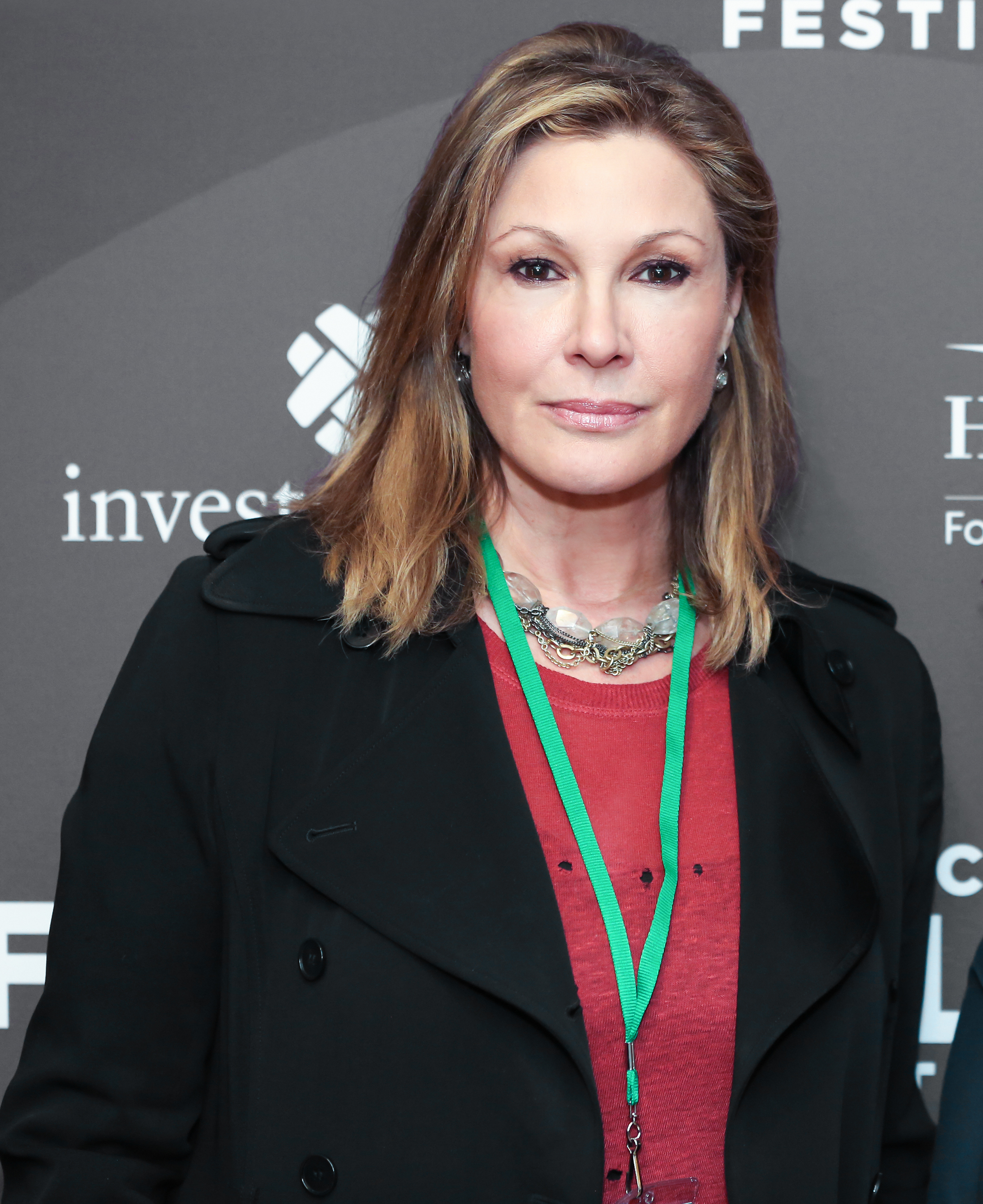
Maria Cuomo Cole in 2016

In 1986, Cole met Maria Cuomo, and they married a year later. Maria Cuomo Cole is the daughter of former New York Governor Mario Cuomo, and sister of former New York State Governor Andrew Cuomo and former CNN journalist Chris Cuomo. One of his daughters, Amanda, hosted the Mets Kids Clubhouse for the SportsNet New York cable TV network.

Cole and his wife Maria purchased a $14.5 million co-op in 2008 on Sutton Place, Manhattan. At one time, fashion designer Bill Blass lived in this same building. As of 2018, he and his wife reside on an 11.35 acre estate in suburban Purchase, Westchester County, New York. Together, they have three daughters.

== Books ==
- Cole, Kenneth, Footnotes: What You Stand for is More Important Than what You Stand in, New York: Simon and Schuster (September 30, 2003)
- Cole, Kenneth, Awearness: Inspiring Stories about How to Make a Difference, New York : DK Melcher Media (November 3, 2008). ISBN 978-1595910462
- Cole, Kenneth, This Is A Kenneth Cole Production, New York: Rizzoli (September 25, 2013)

== See also ==
- List of fashion designers

== Bibliography ==
- Pogrebin, Abigail (2005). Stars of David: Prominent Jews Talk About Being Jewish. New York: Broadway Books. ISBN 0-7679-1612-3.
