= Mary Thom =

American editor

- Born: June 3, 1944; Akron, Ohio, U.S.
- Died: April 26, 2013 (aged 68); Yonkers, New York, U.S.
- Education: Bryn Mawr, 1966
- Occupation: Editor
- Writing career
- Language: English
- Subjects: Feminism, women's rights

Mary Thom (June 3, 1944 – April 26, 2013) was an American feminist, writer, and editor. She was one of the founding editors of Ms. magazine, and was an editor for the magazine for 20 years.

== Early life and education ==
Thom was born in Cleveland, Ohio in 1944, and raised in Akron, Ohio. Her father, Paul, was an engineer who worked in the steel industry. Her mother, Susan, was a homemaker. Thom listened to jazz and enjoyed Shakespeare, encouraged by her mother. She credited these two interests at triggering her interest in activism.

She graduated from Bryn Mawr College in 1966. While there, she became involved in the anti-war and civil rights movements. She was a fundraiser for the Student Nonviolent Coordinating Committee. Thom also joined the Congress on Racial Equality (CORE) during this time.

Thom entered graduate school in 1966 at Columbia University, in pursuit of a PhD in European history but left in 1968 after the tumultuous student strike that began there in April, 1968.

== Career ==
After leaving Columbia, Thom stayed in Manhattan, and for the next three years, worked as an associate editor at Facts on File and, in 1971, volunteered for the newly founded National Women's Political Caucus.

Thom joined Ms. in 1972, first as a volunteer, then a researcher, and then as an editor. She became executive editor in 1990. When she started working at Ms. she created an evaluation system about politicians. It was a feature in the magazine. While at Ms., Thom edited the book, Letters to Ms.

In 1992, Thom left Ms. as the executive editor of the magazine. She wrote a book about the history of the magazine, Inside Ms. 25 Years of the Magazine and the Feminist Movement. in 1997. After she left to become a freelance writer and editor, Thom maintained an association with Ms. until 2001. She also co-wrote a book about Bella Abzug with Suzanne Braun Levine.

At the time of her death, she was an editor-in-chief of the Women's Media Center, a think-tank group. Gloria Steinem called her "one of the women's movement's best editors."

== Later life and death ==
Thom lived and worked in New York City and never married. She enjoyed motorcycles.

Thom was killed in a motorcycle accident in Yonkers, New York on April 26, 2013. Thom had picked up her 1996 Honda Magna 750 from winter storage when she veered into traffic upon entering a highway. She struck a vehicle and was struck by another.

== Legacy ==
The Women's Media Center now sponsors the Mary Thom Art of Editing Award.

== Works ==
- Thom, Mary (1987). Letters to Ms., 1972-1987. New York: Henry Holt. ISBN 9780805003840.
- Thom, Mary (1997). Inside Ms.: 25 years of the magazine and the feminist movement. New York: Henry Holt. ISBN 9780805037326.
- Thom, Mary; Levine, Suzanne Braun (2007). Bella Abzug: how one tough broad from the Bronx fought Jim Crow and Joe McCarthy-- : an oral history. New York: Farrar Straus & Giroux. ISBN 9780374531492.
