= Kenneth Cole Productions =

American fashion house

Kenneth Cole Productions, Inc.
- Company type: Private
- Industry: Fashion
- Founded: September 3, 1982; 43 years ago
- Founders: Kenneth Cole
- Headquarters: 50th Street New York City, United States
- Key people: Kenneth Cole (Chairman); Jed Berger (CEO); David P. Edelman (Chief financial officer)
- Products: Apparel, accessories and fragrances
- Website: www.kennethcole.com

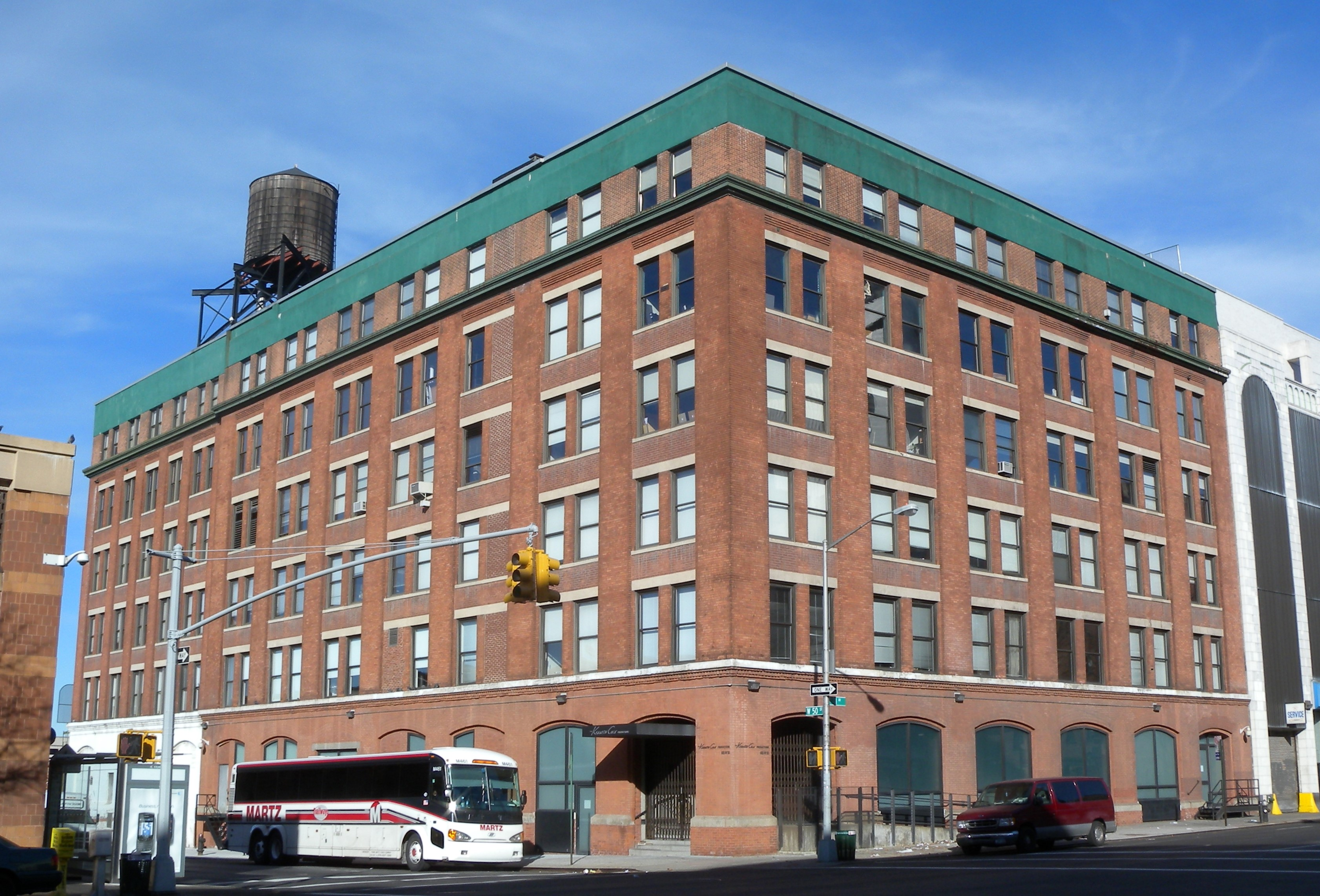
Headquarters

Kenneth Cole Productions, Inc. is an American fashion house that was founded in 1982 by Kenneth Cole.

== History and operations ==
Cole originally named the company Kenneth Cole Incorporated in September 1982 and planned to showcase his new line of shoes during market week at the Hilton New York Hotel. Finding that he could not afford to purchase a hotel room or showroom to exhibit his line, he borrowed a truck and asked the mayor's office for permission to park two blocks away from the Hilton Hotel in front of a fancy shoe building. Upon learning that permits were only granted to utility companies and production companies shooting full-length motion pictures, Cole changed the name of the company to Kenneth Cole Productions, Inc. and applied for a permit to shoot a full-length motion picture entitled The Birth of a Shoe Company.

With Kenneth Cole Productions painted on the side of the truck, they opened for business on December 2, 1982, in front of 1370 Avenue of the Americas. They had a fully furnished forty-foot trailer, klieg lights, a director, a rolling camera, models as actresses, and two NYPD policemen as doormen. A velvet rope allowed a limited number of people into the trailers and in two and a half days they sold forty thousand pairs of shoes. The company remains Kenneth Cole Productions, Inc. to this day to honor this unusual beginning.

In 1984, Kenneth Cole opened his first store on Columbus Avenue in Manhattan, followed shortly thereafter by another store on Union Street in San Francisco. Kenneth Cole retail and Company Stores can now be found worldwide in countries such as Mexico, Canada, Venezuela, Colombia, Israel, United Arab Emirates, United Kingdom, Hong Kong, Philippines, Japan, South Korea, Taiwan, Thailand, Singapore, Australia, Morocco, South Africa and India.

In 2013, Elana Drell Szyfer was named executive vice president of global brand strategy for Kenneth Cole Productions and, before this, she was CEO of Ahava Corp.

Kenneth Cole Productions announced in November 2016 that it would be closing all of its outlet stores within six months to focus on e-commerce and other lines of revenue outside of operating physical stores. Two full-priced stores would remain open in New York and Virginia. In January 2017 Kenneth Cole Productions closed the balance of their outlet stores to pursue its e-commerce business.

In September 2021, Kenneth Cole announced a partnership with Nogin to re-platform their e-commerce business, which would help decrease costs and add AI-generated technology to its website. However, in December 2023, Nogin eventually filed for Chapter 11 bankruptcy, blaming deals on some of its retail partners that required Nogin to purchase their inventory.

== Advertising ==
Kenneth Cole Productions, Inc. is well known for its socially conscious and often controversial advertising. Campaigns often incorporate topical issues, such as addressing Imelda Marcos's shoe fetish in 1986 with the line, "Imelda Marcos bought 2,700 pairs of shoes. She could've at least had the courtesy to buy a pair of ours." In 1994, the company ran its first partisan political ad for that year's New York state gubernatorial race featuring George Pataki and Mario Cuomo, Cole's father-in-law. The ad was an image of a muddy boot with the words: "Next time you hear George Pataki speak, might we suggest the appropriate footwear." Pataki did end up becoming governor and Cole received some backlash for his decision to run the ad.

Not all of their ads are as overtly political, but most have a humorous tint to them, often incorporating word plays or puns. Some of his better-known lines include: "What you stand for is more important than what you stand in", "Are you putting us on?" and "Today is not a dress rehearsal." Popular topics in his advertising include HIV/AIDS, homelessness, gun control, abortion, the environment and same-sex marriage.

The current advertising campaign uses the tagline "We need more than a surface mentality. The writing is on the wall."

== Charity and social causes ==
Kenneth Cole Productions, Inc. is active in charities and often uses advertising, publicity and other corporate initiatives to support charitable causes. He is a longtime board member and current chairman of the board for The Foundation for AIDS Research (amfAR). His involvement with amfAR began in 1985 when he organized a public service campaign that was photographed by Annie Leibovitz and featuring high-profile models such as Christie Brinkley, Paulina Porizkova and Andie MacDowell. The tagline was, “For the future of our children. Support the American Foundation for AIDS Research. We do.” At the time, AIDS was still a relatively unknown and misunderstood disease. Cole managed to procure nearly 3 million dollars' worth of donated exposure and press. In 1987, he was invited to join amfAR's board.

In 2005, Cole spearheaded the “We All Have AIDS” awareness campaign with advertisements photographed by Mark Seliger and featuring Nelson Mandela, Tom Hanks, Will Smith, Elton John, Sharon Stone, Richard Gere, Elizabeth Taylor, Alicia Keys, Desmond Tutu, Natasha Richardson, Eric McCormack, Ashley Judd, Whoopi Goldberg, Harry Belafonte, Greg Louganis and Rosie O'Donnell as spokespeople. He also has annual World AIDS Day promotions in his retail stores.

In August 2006, it was announced that Kenneth Cole Productions would stop selling fur in all of their garments for the Fall 2007 Fashion Season.

Cole is also active with HELP USA (his wife Maria Cuomo Cole is currently chair of the board), a non-profit organization that is the nation's largest provider of housing, jobs and services for the homeless. He partnered with rock star Jon Bon Jovi to create a line of jackets, T-shirts and fragrance under the Kenneth Cole New York label. The proceeds from the sale of these items supported HELP USA.

Other charity campaigns include establishing relief funds for victims of 9/11 and Hurricane Katrina through the sale of T-shirts, giving discounts at his retail stores for donating shoes or clothes to the homeless and hosting numerous charity shopping nights at retail stores throughout the nation.

== Criticism ==
Kenneth Cole Productions has occasionally experienced difficulty adequately staffing its stores in order to properly rotate employees through mandatory rest and meal breaks. For example, on April 16, 2007, the Supreme Court of California unanimously affirmed a trial court judgment requiring the company to pay an additional hour of pay for each day that a store manager had been forced to work a nine-hour shift without a break.
