= Suzanne Braun Levine =

American author and editor

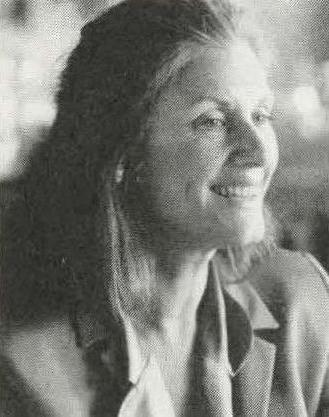
- Levine circa 1988
- Education: Radcliffe College (BA)
- Occupations: Journalist and magazine editor
- Known for: First editor of Ms. magazine
- Spouse: Robert F. Levine
- Children: Two

Suzanne Braun Levine is an American author and editor.

== Career ==
From 1972 until 1988 she was the first editor of Ms., and she was later the first female editor of the Columbia Journalism Review. While at Ms. she developed and produced the documentary She's Nobody's Baby: American Women in the 20th Century, which aired as an HBO special and won a Peabody award. She later edited the book based on the show. She was the guest Editor-in-Chief of the 30th Anniversary issue of Ms. magazine in 2002. She was named a Ms. Magazine "Woman of the Year" in 2004. She joined the Board of Civic Ventures (now Encore.org) in 2009, and is also on the Board of the Ms. Foundation for Education and Communication, and on the Advisory Board for the Women’s Media Center and The Transition Network. She gave a talk at TEDxWomen in 2011.

Levine wrote for many websites including: Feisty Side of Fifty, The Transition Network, The Third Age, Vibrant Nation, AARP, Huff/Post50, Next/Avenue, SheWrites, and Feminist.com. She contributed the piece "Parenting: A New Social Contract" to the 2003 anthology Sisterhood Is Forever: The Women's Anthology for a New Millennium, edited by Robin Morgan.

She also appeared on TV and radio shows including: Oprah, Charlie Rose, Today, and NPR.

The papers from her time at Ms. magazine are now in the Sophia Smith Collection of Women’s Archives at Smith College.

== Personal life ==
She is married to the attorney Robert F. Levine, and has two children.

== Books ==
- Levine, Suzanne Braun; Lyons, Harriet (1980). A Decade of Women: A Ms. History of the Seventies in Words and Pictures
- Levine, Suzanne Braun (editor); Dworkin, Andrea (author) (1983). She's Nobody's Baby; A History of American Women in the 20th Century
- Levine, Suzanne Braun (Apr 17, 2000). Father Courage: What Happens When Men Put Family First
- Levine, Suzanne Braun Parenting: a new social contract in Morgan, Robin (2003). Sisterhood is Forever
- Levine, Suzanne Braun (Feb 7, 2005). Woman's Guide to Second Adulthood
- Levine, Suzanne Braun (Dec 27, 2005). Inventing the Rest of Our Lives: Women in Second Adulthood
- Levine, Suzanne Braun; Thom, Mary (2007). Bella Abzug: how one tough broad from the Bronx fought Jim Crow and Joe McCarthy-- : an oral history. New York: Farrar Straus & Giroux. ISBN 9780374531492.
- Levine, Suzanne Braun (Mar 30, 2010). Fifty Is the New Fifty: Ten Life Lessons for Women in Second Adulthood
- Levine, Suzanne Braun (Dec 29, 2011). How We Love Now: Sex and the New Intimacy in Second Adulthood
- Levine, Suzanne Braun (Apr 16, 2013). You Gotta Have Girlfriends: A Post-Fifty Posse Is Good for Your Health
