= Robin Pogrebin =

American journalist

- Born: May 17, 1965 (age 61)
- Education: Yale University (BA)
- Occupations: Journalist; Writer
- Parent(s): Letty Cottin Pogrebin; Bert Pogrebin
- Family: Abigail Pogrebin (sister)

Robin Pogrebin (POG-re-bin; born May 17, 1965) has been a reporter for The New York Times since 1995, where she covers arts and culture.

== Biography ==
Pogrebin is the daughter of the writer Letty Cottin Pogrebin and Bert Pogrebin, a labor lawyer. She is the identical twin sister of Abigail Pogrebin, also a writer. She is a graduate of Yale University.

Before joining the Times Culture desk, Pogrebin previously covered the media for the Business desk and city news for the Metro desk. She was also previously an associate producer for Peter Jennings' documentary unit at ABC News, where she covered stories on subjects such as Bosnia and Haiti. and Christianity in America. Before that, she was a staff reporter for the New York Observer, covering a range of subjects including city government, law and the restaurant business. Pogrebin has occasionally written freelance pieces for publications such as Architectural Digest, New York, Vogue, and Departures.

Pogrebin is also the author, with Kate Kelly, of The Education of Brett Kavanaugh: An Investigation, a book about allegations from Kavanaugh's 2018 Supreme Court nomination hearings which was published in September 2019 from Portfolio Books, a division of Penguin Random House. Before Kavanaugh's confirmation in October, 2018, Pogrebin, who was a classmate of Kavanaugh at Yale, and Kelly, also at the Times, were featured in a podcast about what the judge's classmates were saying concerning his nomination to the Supreme Court.

== Personal life ==
In 1993, she married attorney Edward J. Klaris in New Paltz, New York. They separated in 2022 and were officially divorced in 2025.

== See also ==
- New Yorkers in journalism
