= Ms. (magazine) =

American liberal feminist magazine

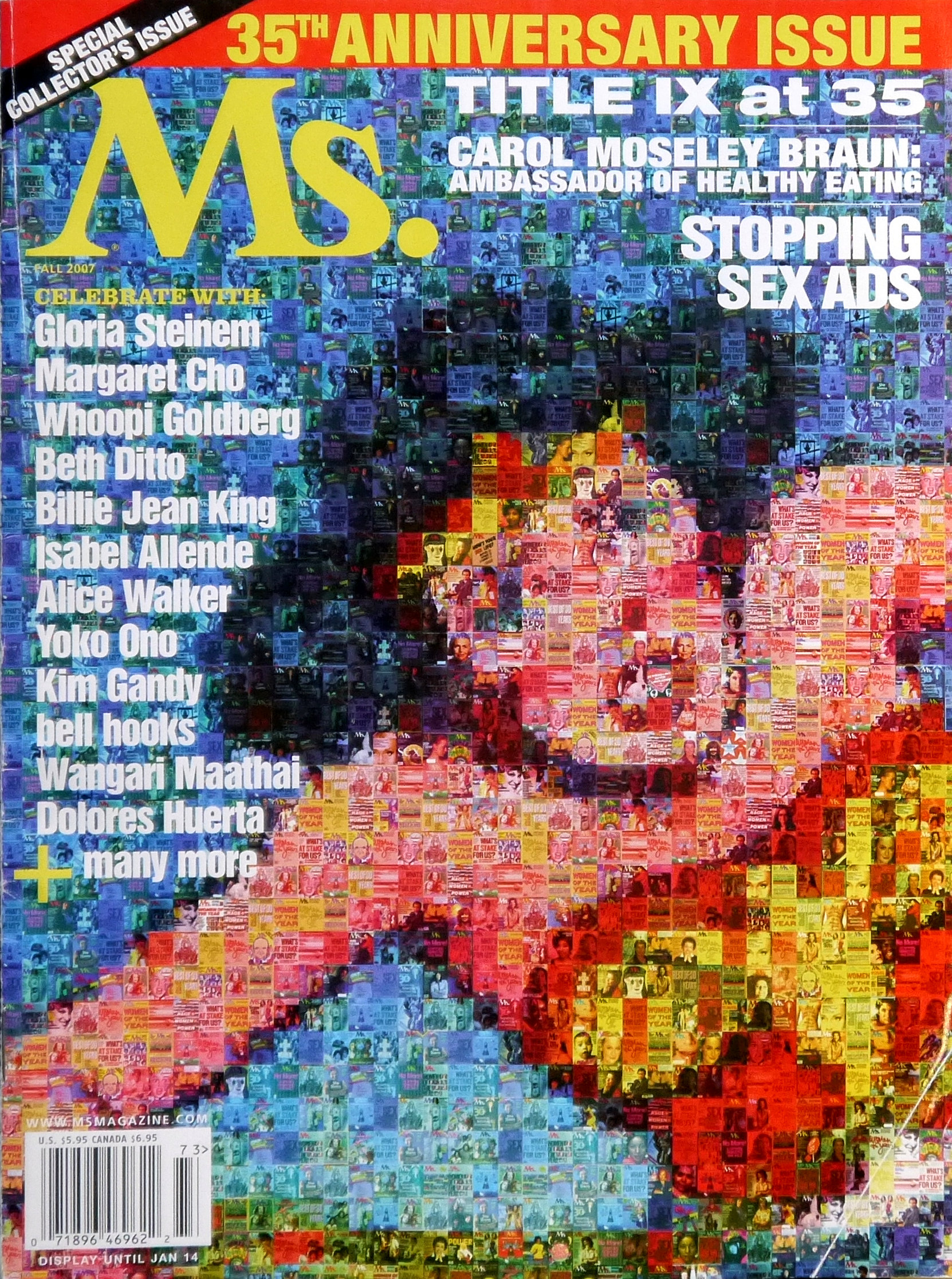
- Ms. magazine cover, Fall 2007, 35th Anniversary issue featuring Wonder Woman
- Executive Editor: Katherine Spillar
- Categories: Feminism
- Frequency: Quarterly
- Circulation: 110,000
- Publisher: Liberty Media for Women, LLC
- First issue: December 1971; 54 years ago
- Company: Feminist Majority Foundation
- Country: United States
- Based in: Arlington County, Virginia, U.S.
- Language: English
- Website: msmagazine.com
- ISSN: 0047-8318

Ms. is an American feminist magazine co-founded in 1971 by the journalist and sociopolitical activist Gloria Steinem. It was the first national American feminist magazine. The original editors were Letty Cottin Pogrebin, Mary Thom, Pat Carbine, Joanne Edgar, Nina Finkelstein, Mary Peacock, Margaret Sloan-Hunter, and Gloria Steinem.

Beginning as a one-off insert in New York magazine in 1971, the first stand-alone issue of Ms. appeared in July 1972, with funding from New York editor Clay Felker. The original publisher was co-founder Elizabeth Forsling Harris, a Peace Corps activist and Democratic National Committee operative, who sold her stock back to the company in 1972. Harris later sued the magazine for $1.7 million.

Ms. was intended to appeal to a wide audience and featured articles about a variety of issues related to women and feminism. From July 1972 until 1987, it was published monthly. At its peak in the 1970s, Ms. enjoyed great success but was not always able to reconcile its ideological concerns with commercial considerations. Since 2001, the magazine has been published by the Feminist Majority Foundation, based in Los Angeles and Arlington, Virginia. It now publishes quarterly.

== From 1971 to 1987 ==
=== The first cover of Ms. magazine ===
The preview issue of Ms. magazine was published in December 1971 by New York magazine. The cover, illustrated by Miriam Wosk, depicts a pregnant version of the Hindu goddess Kali using eight arms to hold a clock, skillet, typewriter, rake, mirror, telephone, steering wheel, and an iron. 300,000 test copies of the magazine sold out in three days, and generated 26,000 subscription orders within the next few weeks. Steinem advocated for this cover as she liked the imagery of a woman juggling multiple facets of life, something that Ms. magazine would focus on. Additionally, the cover displays a Hindu goddess to convey messages of neutrality and female universality.

=== Origins and creation ===
Ms. was viewed as a voice for women by women, a voice that had been hidden from and left out of mainstream media. The magazine's first publication as an independent issue included articles about women who had experience with abortions, promoting the removal of sexist wording from the English language, and literature focused on helping women realize they could stand up for themselves against social norms. It was influenced by the women in print movement, an international effort to establish alternative communications networks of feminist publication, presses, and bookstores created by and for women. Unlike many other publications associated with the movement, Ms. was larger, had a national readership, and operated like a traditional magazine with professional journalists, editors, and printers. However, Ms. was still influenced by the collectivist principles of other feminist periodicals of the period.

Co-founder Gloria Steinem explained the motivation for starting Ms. magazine, stating: "I realized as a journalist that there really was nothing for women to read that was controlled by women, and this caused me along with a number of other women to start Ms. magazine." Steinem wanted a publication that would address issues that modern women cared about instead of just domestic topics such as fashion and housekeeping. Steinem originally wanted Ms. to be a newsletter but was convinced to make it into a magazine by her peers. Patricia Carbine thought a magazine was better because of the money from advertisers and that it could reach their audience with its portable, visually pleasing, easy format. The creators of Ms. expected there to be significant participation of the general public as well as readers. For example, the first issue published in 1972 included a feature titled "We have had abortions", a list of famous women acknowledging that they have gone through this particular medical operation. The feature had a coupon for readers to include their own names as part of this list. In addition, readers frequently interacted with the magazine through sending in letters to the editors about the personal importance of Ms. magazine.

As to the origin of the name chosen for the magazine, she has stated: "We were going to call it Sojourner, after Sojourner Truth, but that was perceived as a travel magazine. Then we were going to call it Sisters, but that was seen as a religious magazine. We settled on Ms. because it was symbolic, and also, it was short, which is good for a logo." "Lilith" and "Bimbo" were considered titles for the magazine as well. At this time, the honorific "Ms.", an alternative to "Miss" or "Mrs." that neutralizes a women's marital status, was being promoted by Sheila Michaels but not yet well known or defined by the media. In particular, when Michaels suggested the use of "Ms." in 1969, in a lull during a WBAI-radio interview with The Feminists group, a friend of Steinem heard the interview and suggested it as a title for her new magazine.

=== Wonder Woman cover ===
Gloria Steinem placed Wonder Woman, in costume, on the cover of the first independently published issue of Ms. v1 #1, July 1972 (Warner Communications, DC Comics' owner, was an investor), which also contained an appreciative essay about the character. Steinem was offended that the world's most famous female superhero had had her powers removed in the most recently published comics. The progressive author Samuel R. Delany wrote two issues of the Wonder Woman comic book in 1972, during this controversial period in the publication's history when the lead character abandoned her superpowers and became a secret agent. Delany was initially supposed to write a six-issue story arc that would culminate in a battle over an abortion clinic, but the story arc was canceled after Steinem led a lobbying effort protesting the removal of Wonder Woman's powers, a change predating Delany's involvement. Scholar Ann Matsuuchi concluded that Steinem's feedback was "conveniently used as an excuse" by DC management. Wonder Woman's powers and traditional costume were restored in issue #204 (January–February 1973).

Joanne Edgar wrote the cover story for the 1972 issue with Wonder Woman. She described her personal relationship with comic books and applied issues women were facing such as power dynamics and gender discrimination at the work place to the character.

Ms. featured Wonder Woman on the cover of their magazine in 1972 with the title "Wonder Woman For President". Steinem wanted to lobby DC comics to display Wonder Woman as a feminist hero because she felt that new images of Wonder Woman in the 1960s objectified her. By including Wonder Woman on the cover of Ms., Steinem was able to encourage Dick Giordano to reinstate Wonder Woman's truth lasso, bracelets, and her origin story.

The Ms. cover wanted to embrace the traits of compassion that Wonder Woman had as well as her belief in justice. Tim Hanley, a comic historian, commented on how the Ms. cover, emphasized unity and "sisterhood". While some women were in support of Wonder Woman being an icon of second-wave feminism, others critiqued Ms. for displaying a woman with "superhuman" or unachievable qualities. However, the Ms. editors were worried about featuring actual female public figures on their covers early on due to their worry of tokenizing them as the symbol of the feminist movement.

Jill Lepore reflected on Ms. magazine's cover with Wonder Woman by calling it the connection between first-wave feminism and second-wave feminism. Wonder Woman was inspired by the efforts of the women's suffrage movement and by the work of women in the Great Depression.

=== Editorial content ===
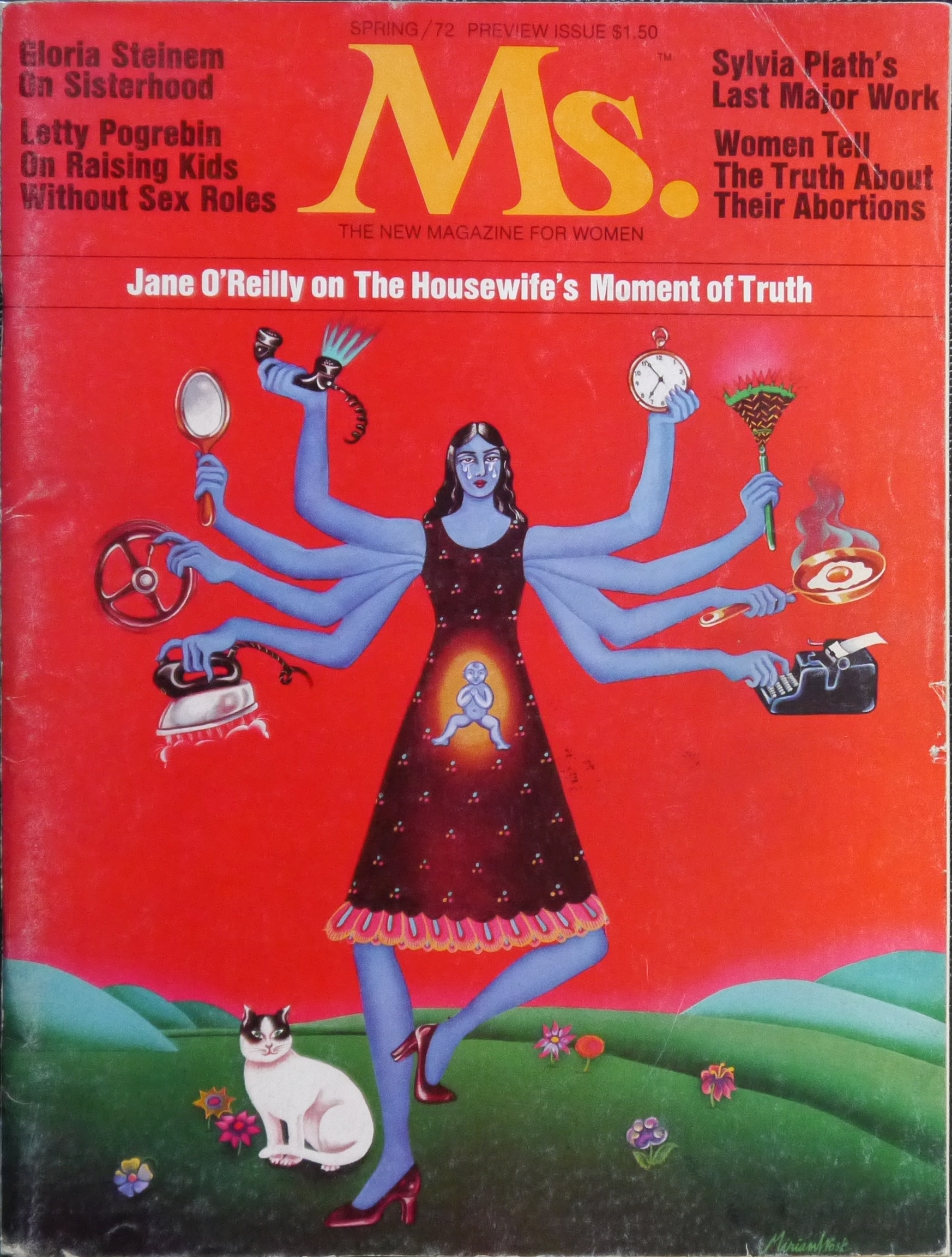
Ms. magazine cover, 1972

"The Housewife's Moment of Truth", the first cover story for Ms. magazine, was written by Jane O'Reilly. O'Reilly's article spoke for feminist strength and the opposition against the repression of wives in society and the home. The article also helped introduce the idea of "click!", or the realization a woman acquires when she realizes the demands being pushed upon her to act, work and behave in a certain way can be fought against.

In 1972, Ms. published the names of 53 women who admitted to having had abortions when the procedure was illegal in most states of the country. The Ms. petition included a tear-out section for women to remove, sign and send back to the magazine. The tear-out section stated:

The attitudes and laws against abortion in this country are causing untold suffering. Approximately one million American women had "illegal" abortions in 1971 — many of them self-induced or performed by the unqualified, some of them fatal. I have had an abortion. I publicly join millions of other American women in demanding a repeal of all laws that restrict our reproductive freedom.

Signatories included Billie Jean King, Judy Collins, Anaïs Nin, Gloria Steinem, Susan Sontag, and Nora Ephron. The petition drew on evidence that around 25% of American women had chosen to have an abortion, despite its variable legal status. Called the American Women's Petition, the Ms. petition was inspired by the Manifesto of the 343 that had been published the previous year in which 343 French women publicly declared that they had had an abortion, which was also illegal in France at the time. In 1973, the Roe v. Wade decision by the Supreme Court of the United States would legalize abortion throughout the country.

The petition was the inspiration for a similar campaign by Ms. in 2006, as well as an amicus brief signed by more than 100 American lawyers in support of overturning the abortion regulations at issue in Whole Woman's Health v. Hellerstedt.

The January 1973 edition featured Shirley Chisholm and Sissy Farenthold on the cover with the title: "The Ticket That Might Have Been."

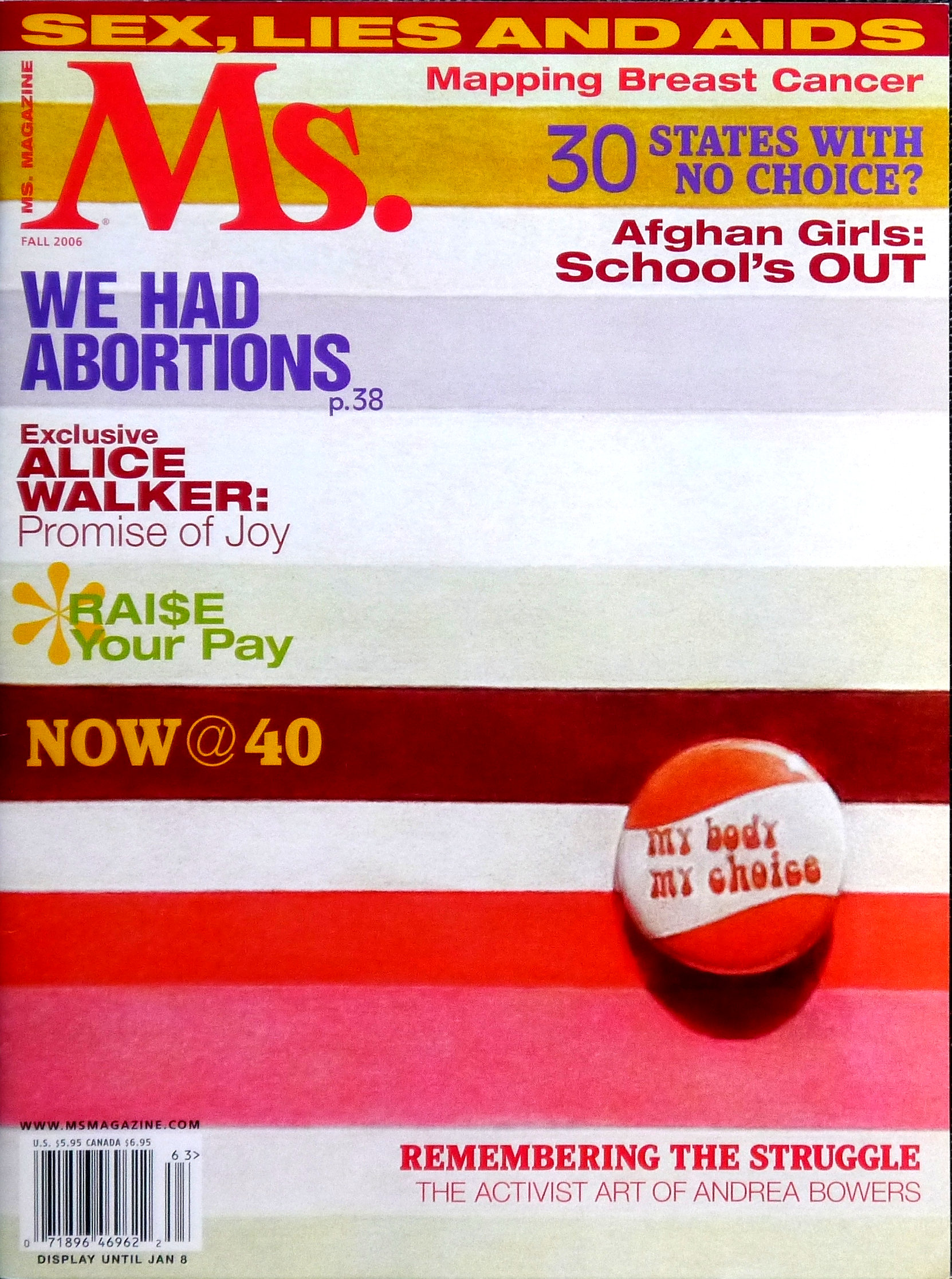
Fall 2006 issue of Ms. magazine for "We Had Abortions"

From 1974 to 1977, Ms. collaborated with public broadcasting and, with the help of a grant from the Corporation for Public Funding, produced the television series Woman Alive!. The show was formatted to reflect the magazine, and consisted of short documentaries made by independent women filmmakers, interviews, and entertainment segments.

A 1976 cover story on battered women made Ms. the first national magazine to address the issue of domestic violence. The cover photo featured a woman with a bruised face.

From 1972 until 1988, Suzanne Braun Levine served as editor of Ms.

In conjunction with other efforts towards feminist language reform, Ms. challenged the common holiday phrase "Peace on earth, good will to men" by changing the salutation to "Peace on earth, good will to people." In its earliest years, the magazine's December cover proclaimed this altered holiday message in bold, colorful designs by Brazilian designer Bea Feitler, as well as in editorial addresses from Steinem.

Over its long history, the magazine has featured articles written by and about many women and men at the forefront of business, politics, activism, and journalism. The magazine's investigative journalism broke several landmark stories on topics including overseas sweatshops, sex trafficking, the wage gap, the glass ceiling, date rape, and domestic violence.

The type of feminist that Ms. attracted is most often labeled as a "cultural" feminist, those interested in changing the deep rooted gender norms within American culture. Ms. magazine editors represented this background as they did not identify as women in politics or political feminists; rather, they were activists, writers, and graduates of all women's colleges. Though the editors represented a small fraction of feminists in the 1970s, Ms. strove to represent the term "female universality", a phrase that encompassed representation of all women no matter their socio-economic status, race, religion, or political beliefs.

== Since 1987 ==
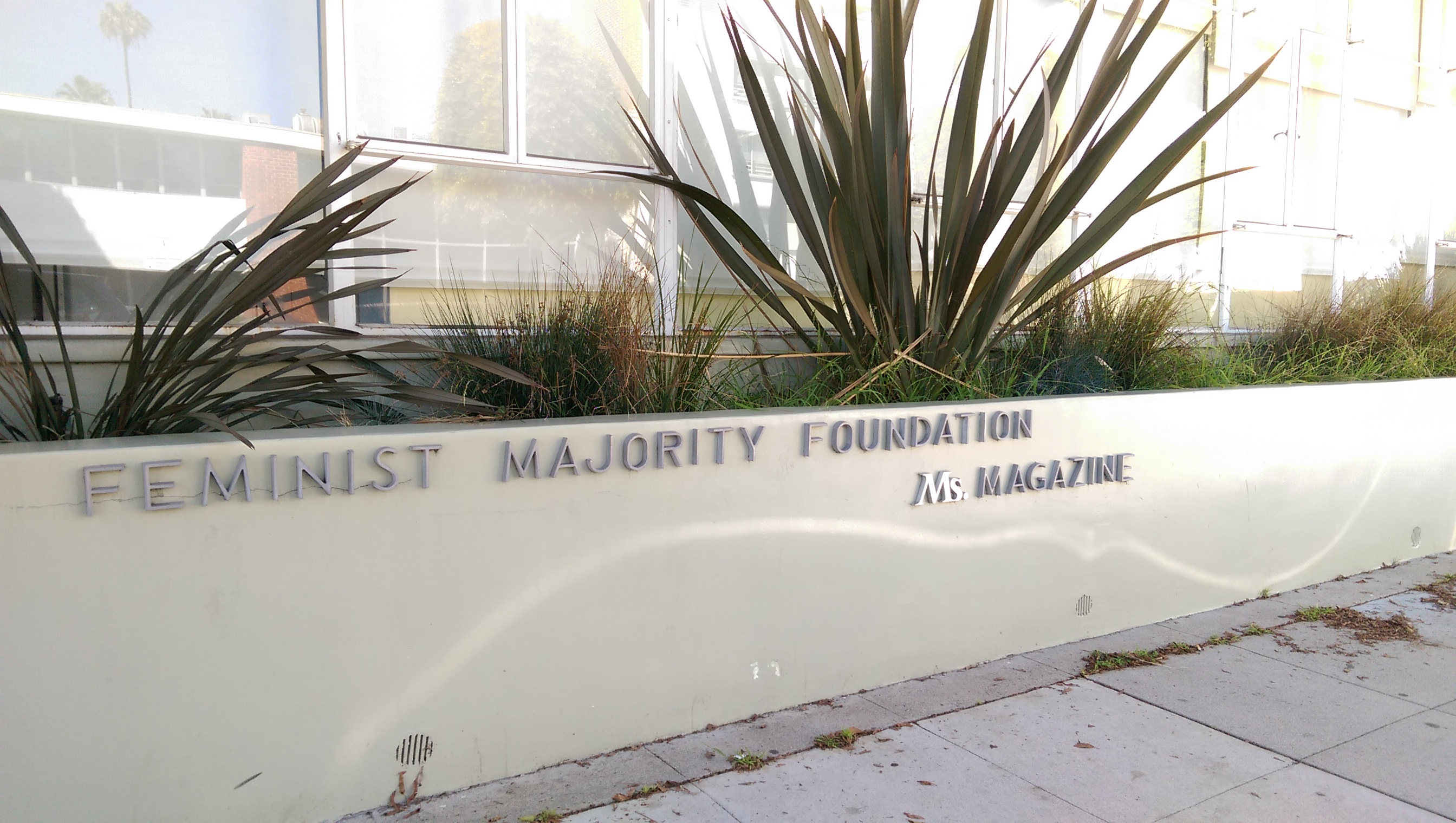
Ms. magazine offices in Los Angeles, California

In 1987, Ms. was bought by Fairfax, an Australian media company, which appointed the head of its US arm, Sandra Yates, to oversee the magazine's editorial and financial turnaround. In 1989, concerned about a perceived "Cher cover"-centered editorial direction under Anne Summers, American Feminists bought it back and began publishing the magazine without ads.

Robin Morgan and Marcia Ann Gillespie served respective terms as Editors in Chief of the magazine. Gillespie was the first African-American woman to lead Ms. For a period, the magazine was published by MacDonald Communications Corp., which also published Working Woman and Working Mother magazines. Known since its inception for unique feminist analysis of current events, Ms. magazine's 1991 change to an ad-free format also made it known for exposing the control that many advertisers assert over content in women's magazines.

In 1998, Gloria Steinem, Marcia Ann Gillespie and a group of female investors created Liberty Media (not the cable/satellite conglomerate of the same name) and brought the magazine under independent ownership. It remained ad-free and won several awards, including an Utne award for social commentary. With Liberty Media facing bankruptcy in November 2001, the Feminist Majority Foundation purchased the magazine, dismissed the staff, and moved the editorial headquarters from New York to Los Angeles. Formerly bimonthly, the magazine has since published quarterly.

In 2005, under editor-in-chief Elaine Lafferty, Ms. was nominated for a National Magazine Award for Martha Mendoza's article "Between a Woman and Her Doctor". Despite this success, Lafferty left the magazine after only two years following various disagreements including the editorial direction on a cover story on Desperate Housewives, and a perceived generation gap towards third-wave feminists and grunge.

=== Later editorial content ===
Another "We Had Abortions" petition appeared in the October 2006 issue as part of the issue's cover story. This time, the petition contained signatures of more than 5,000 women declaring that they had had an abortion and were "unashamed of (the) decision", including actresses Amy Brenneman and Kathy Najimy, comedian Carol Leifer, and Steinem herself.

In 2017, Ms. celebrated its 45th anniversary of publication. In honor of this event, Ms. made a reference to their very first issue in 1972 that featured Wonder Woman on the cover. This choice was based on Wonder Woman's belief in "sisterhood and equality", something Ms. states is a "driving value" for feminist beliefs not only when the magazine first began, but in today's society.

== Ms. magazine and women of color ==
=== Ms. and black women ===
Steinem, herself, was inspired by many women of color throughout her career in activism. Most notably, Steinem worked with Flo Kennedy and Shirley Chisholm for advocating for women's rights. Steinem founded Ms. magazine with Dorothy Pitman Hughes, who was involved in child-welfare activism as well as the Civil Rights Movement. In 1973, Ms. featured a cover of Shirley Chisholm titled as "The Ticket That Might Have Been…". At the same time, Ms. magazine was also criticized for the lack of diversity displayed in its content, especially towards the end of their era of influence in the late 1980s. In 1986, author Alice Walker, a contributor to Ms., resigned, citing the lack of diversity on the magazine's covers and its limited features of women of color. Walker had previously written an article in 1975 titled "In Search of Zora Neale Hurston", which was credited to have created new interests in Black female writers. The editors of Ms. admit, as they reflect back on their influence in the 1970s, that their publications were perceived as "elitist" at times due to their staff but the content was always meant to be inclusive. In 1975, Ms. magazine had a cover of Pam Grier and in 1979 they had Michelle Wallace on the cover. Though Ms. did feature covers of Black women, magazines such as Essence created during a similar time period focused more on Black female empowerment. There has been no association found between Black feminist media organizations such as the Kitchen Table Press and the Combahee River Collective and Ms.

From 1993 to 2001, during Marcia Ann Gillespie's tenure, the voices and perspectives of women of color and inclusion of diverse feminists and opinions dramatically increased.

As of 2020, Ms. magazine has features and columns that highlight the work of Black women. For example, Janell Hobson, a Ms. Scholar, works on the Black Feminist in Public series highlighting intersectionality in the media.

=== Ms. and indigenous women ===
Steinem was greatly influenced by the activism of Wilma Mankiller, a member of the Cherokee Nation in Oklahoma. Mankiller joined the board of Ms. Foundation for Women in 1973 and was awarded the title of Woman of Year by Ms. in 1987. Steinem and Mankiller were friends, advisors, and colleagues. Mankiller focused on indigenous women's rights and collaborated with Steinem on this issue as well. The magazine's coverage of issues affecting the indigenous community has increased over the last couple of years. For example, Ms. covered the passage of legislation to protect indigenous women such as the Savannah Act and the Not Invisible Act.

== Advertising policy ==
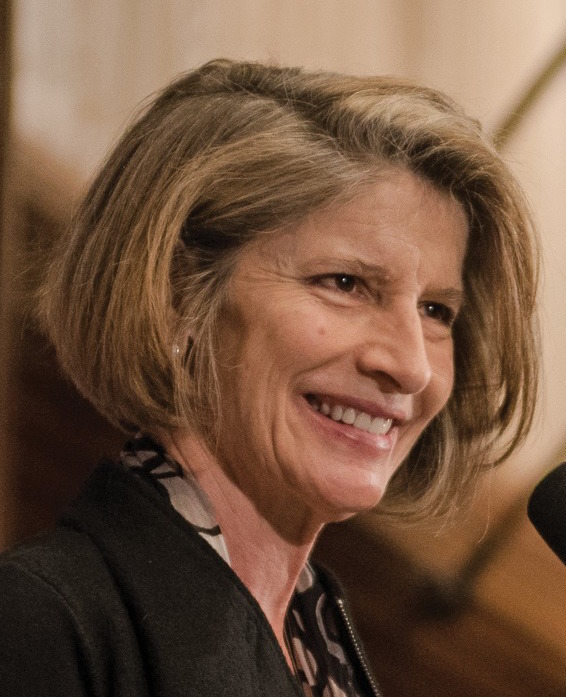
Katherine Spillar, current executive editor of Ms. magazine

On January 10, 2008, the American Jewish Congress released an official statement which was critical of Ms. magazine's refusal to accept from them a full-page advertisement honoring three prominent Israeli women: Dorit Beinisch (president of the Supreme Court of Israel), Tzipi Livni (Foreign Affairs Minister of Israel), and Dalia Itzik (speaker of the Knesset).

The New York Jewish Week reported that a number of Jewish feminists, including Jewish Orthodox Feminist Alliance founder Blu Greenberg, were mostly disappointed with the decision by Ms. to reject the ad.

However, Katherine Spillar, executive editor of Ms., responded to these criticisms on the magazine's website, rejecting claims of anti-Israel bias. She argued that the proposed advertisement was inconsistent with the magazine's policy to accept only "mission-driven advertisements from primarily non-profit, non-partisan organizations", suggesting that the advertisement could have been perceived "as favoring certain political parties within Israel over other parties, but also with its slogan 'This is Israel', the ad implied that women in Israel hold equal positions of power with men". Spillar stated that the magazine had "covered the Israeli feminist movement and women leaders in Israel ... eleven times' in its last four years of issues".

== Writers ==
Contributors have included:

- Angela Davis
- Barbara Ehrenreich
- Susan Faludi
- Alice Walker
- Marcia Gillespie
- Jane O'Reilly
- Susan Braudy
- Letty Cottin Pogrebin

== See also ==
- Joy Picus, Los Angeles City Council member, 1977–93, a Ms. Woman of the Year in 1985
- Yolanda Serrano, HIV/AIDS activist, a Ms. Woman of the Year in 1988
- Ashley Jaye Williams, artist, illustrated the 50th anniversary edition cover of Ms. in 2023.
- Dear Ms.: A Revolution in Print, 2025 documentary film about the magazine
