= Stars of David: Prominent Jews Talk About Being Jewish =

2005 book by Abigail Pogrebin

- Author: Abigail Pogrebin
- Subject: Social science, ethnic studies, popular culture
- Genre: Biography, interviews
- Publisher: Broadway Books, Random House
- Publication date: 2005
- Pages: 400
- ISBN: 0767916131
- OCLC: 153581202

Stars of David: Prominent Jews Talk About Being Jewish (2005) is a book by journalist and former 60 Minutes producer Abigail Pogrebin. The 400-page book was published by Random House.

The book features a series of interviews with 62 prominent American Jews discussing their feelings about being Jewish. Among those interviewed are actress and producer Sarah Jessica Parker, U.S. Supreme Court Justice Ruth Bader Ginsburg, television and radio host Larry King, director Mike Nichols, actor Dustin Hoffman, director Steven Spielberg, actor Gene Wilder, comedian Joan Rivers, political analyst William Kristol, lawyer Alan Dershowitz, baseball player Shawn Green, actress Natalie Portman, playwright Tony Kushner, and actor Leonard Nimoy. Some speak about anti-Semitism that they faced. Kenneth Cole, Eliot Spitzer and Ronald Perelman discuss their intermarriages. Mike Wallace, Richard Dreyfuss and Ruth Reichl discuss their feelings toward Israel.

Liz Smith wrote that it "is an endearing book done with skill and taste."

In 2012, Philadelphia Theatre Company presented the Philadelphia world premiere of a musical stage adaptation of the book, titled Stars of David. The script is by Tony Award nominee Charles Busch.
