= Letty Cottin Pogrebin =

American author, journalist, lecturer, and social justice activist

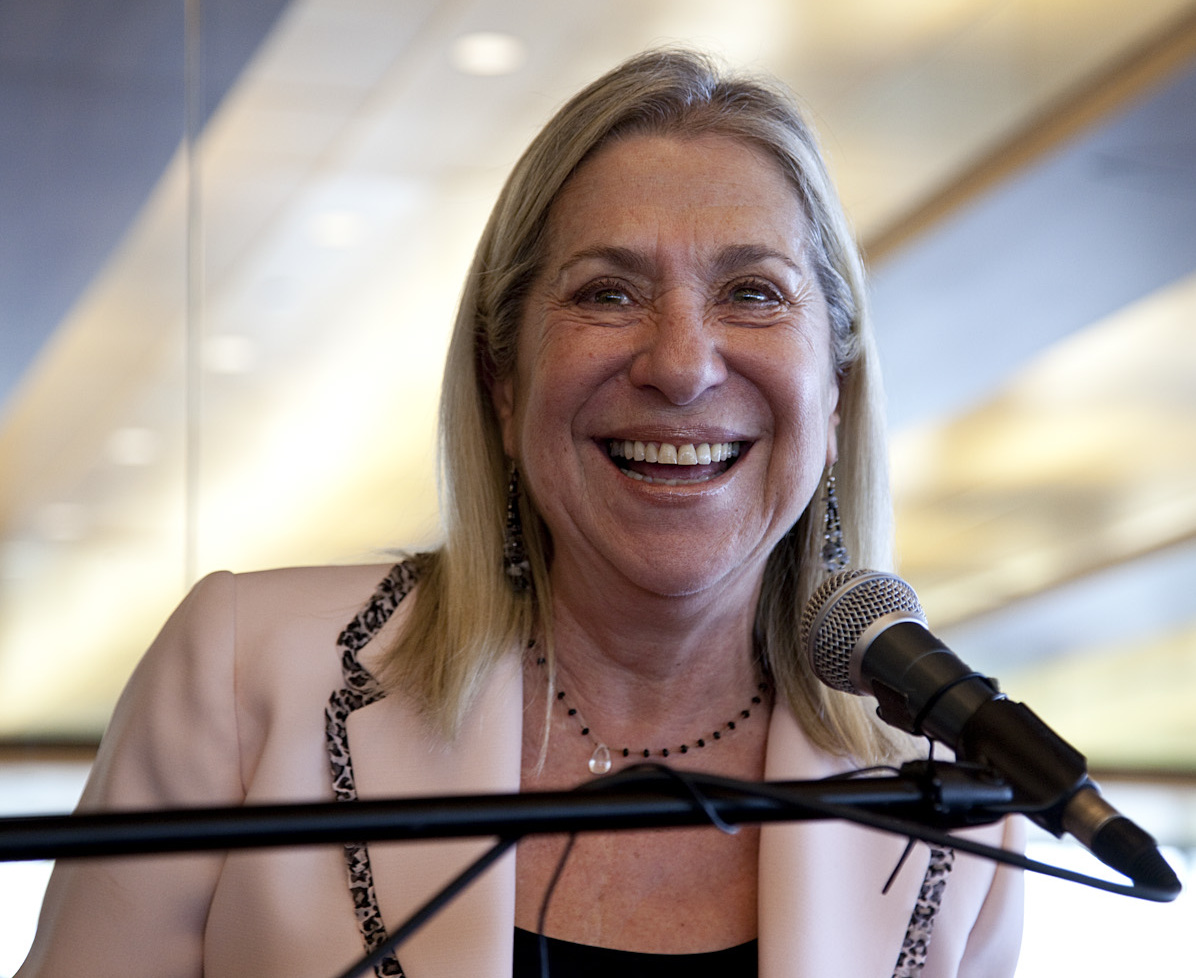
- Letty Cottin Pogrebin at the JWA Making Trouble/Making History luncheon on March 18, 2012.
- Born: Loretta Cottin; June 9, 1939 (age 87); Queens, New York, New York, US
- Occupations: Writer, journalist
- Movement: Feminism
- Spouse: Bert Pogrebin
- Children: 3 including Abigail Pogrebin and Robin Pogrebin
- Website: http://www.lettycottinpogrebin.com

Letty Cottin Pogrebin (born June 9, 1939) is an American author, journalist, lecturer, and social activist. She is a founding editor of Ms. magazine, the author of twelve books, and was an editorial consultant for the TV special Free to Be... You and Me (as well as for the album and book associated with it) for which she earned an Emmy.

== Early life and education ==
Loretta (Letty) Cottin was born to a Conservative Jewish family in Queens, the daughter of Cyral (née Halpern) and Jacob Cottin. Her father was a lawyer who was active in the Jewish community and her mother was a designer. She attended the Yeshiva of Central Queens and the Jamaica Jewish Center Hebrew High School. After graduating from Jamaica High School in Jamaica, Queens, she earned a bachelor's degree from Brandeis University in English and American literature in 1959.

== Career ==
She was a founding editor of Ms. Magazine and a cofounder of Ms. Foundation for Women and the National Women's Political Caucus.

From 1960 to 1970, she worked for the publishing company Bernard Geis Associates as director of publicity and later vice president. From 1970 to 1980, she wrote a column for Ladies' Home Journal called "The Working Woman."

In 1976, Pogrebin was among 13 women who attended a feminist Passover Seder, the first organized and led by Esther M. Broner in her New York City apartment.

in 1977, Pogrebin became an associate of the Women's Institute for Freedom of the Press (WIFP). WIFP is an American nonprofit publishing organization. The organization works to increase communication between women and connect the public with forms of women-based media.

In 1979, the Supersisters trading card set was produced and distributed; one of the cards featured Pogrebin's name and picture.

She authored How to Be a Friend to a Friend Who's Sick, a guide, after she was diagnosed with breast cancer in 2009.

She was featured (among others) in the 2013 documentary film Makers: Women Who Make America.

Pogrebin is a life member of Hadassah, and in 2013 was awarded that year's Myrtle Wreath Award from Hadassah's Southern New Jersey Region.

She is a board member of (among other organizations) the Director's Council of the Women in Religion Program at the Harvard Divinity School, the Ms. Foundation for Education and Communication, and the Women's, Gender, and Sexuality Studies Program at Brandeis University.

== Personal life ==
Letty Cottin met and married Bert Pogrebin in 1963, first meeting at Fire Island in June, and marrying before the end of the year. Six years her senior, he was a management-side labor lawyer, and a partner at Littler Mendelson. Together, they had identical twin daughters, Robin Pogrebin and Abigail Pogrebin (1965), and a son, David (1968). Bert died in 2024.

She is the grandmother of six.

== Books ==
- How to Make It in a Man's World (1970)
- Free to Be You and Me (1972) (consulting editor)
- Getting Yours: How to Make the System Work for the Working Woman (1976)
- Growing Up Free: Raising Your Child in the 80s (1980)
- Stories for Free Children (1982) (editor)
- Family Politics: Love and Power on an Intimate Frontier (1983)
- Free to Be...A Family (1987) (consulting editor)
- Among Friends: Who We Like, Why We Like Them and What We Do with Them (1988)
- Deborah, Golda, and Me: Being Female and Jewish in America (1991)
- Getting Over Getting Older: An Intimate Journey (1996)
- Three Daughters (2003)
- How to Be a Friend to a Friend Who's Sick (2013)
- Single Jewish Male Seeking Soulmate (2015)
- Shanda: A Memoir of Shame and Secrecy (2022)
