= Veteran Feminists of America =

Charitable advocacy organization

- Abbreviation: VFA
- Formation: 1992
- Founder: Jacqueline Ceballos
- Board of directors: Virginia Carter; Roxanne Barton Conlin; Carol Jenkins; Barbara Love; Linda Stein
- Key people: Eleanor Pam, President; Muriel Fox, Chair of the Board
- Website: VFA.org

Veteran Feminists of America (VFA) is a 501(c)(3) charitable organization for supporters and veterans of the second-wave feminist movement. Founded by Jacqueline Ceballos in 1992, Veteran Feminists of America regularly hosts reunions for second-wave feminists and events honoring feminist leaders.

== History ==
After holding their first reunion in 1992, Jacqueline Ceballos joined with Dorothy Senerchia and Mary Jean Tully to create the organization. Muriel Fox became chair of the board in 1994 and remained in the position through 2025. As of 2026, the organization's president is Eleanor Pam.

The original idea for a name, Veterans of Feminist Wars, was rejected because its acronym could be confused with that of the Veterans of Foreign Wars organization.

In 1998, VFA Board member Barbara Love, with help from VFA members, began compiling a directory of feminists, published in 2006 as Feminists Who Changed America: 1963-1975. The book is a collection of 2,220 biographies of second-wave feminists who accomplished significant activist work.

VFA's artifacts and collections are held at Duke University's Sallie Bingham Center for Women's History and Culture.

== Mission ==
According to the organization's mission statement,

The purpose of Veteran Feminists of America Inc. is to honor, record and preserve the history of the accomplishments of women and men active in the feminist movement, to educate the public on the importance of the changes brought about by the women’s movement, and to preserve the movement’s history for future generations.

The Veteran Feminists of America was created with the goals of remembering and recording the faces and retrospectives of the hundreds of pioneers who launched the 1960s feminist movement, often called second-wave feminism. VFA's major effort is the Pioneer Histories Project, which has compiled interviews with hundreds of feminist activists.

== Events ==
On February 4, 2021, VFA held a Zoom webinar honoring National Organization for Women (NOW) founder Betty Friedan on the 100th anniversary of her birth.

VFA has held a number of events honoring second-wave feminists. Recordings of these receptions are archived at the Sallie Bingham Center for Women's History and Culture at Duke University.

Notable events include:

- December 1993 – Honoring Flo Kennedy. Seventh Regiment Armory, New York City.
- May 1994 – Honoring Congresswoman Martha Griffiths. Also honored were Betty Friedan, Gene Boyer and Evelyn Cunningham. Sewall-Belmont House, Washington, D.C.
- Fall 1994 – Honoring Congresswoman Bella Abzug. Seventh Regiment Armory, New York City
- December 13, 1995 – Honoring Gloria Steinem. Seventh Regiment Armory, New York City
- December 13, 1997 – Celebrating the women's liberation movement. Speakers included Heather Booth, Jo Freeman, Susan Brownmiller, and Alix Kates Shulman. Seventh Regiment Armory, New York City
- April 1998 – Honoring great feminists, including Gerda Lerner. Seventh Regiment Armory, New York City.
- November 7, 1998 – Honoring Kate Millett. Seventh Regiment Armory, New York City.
- May 1999 – Honoring feminists including Donna Allen, Elizabeth Boyer and Vera Glaser. Washington DC
- April 28, 2000 – "Spring Reunion – VFA Celebrates Some Of Our National Treasures." Honorees included Congresswoman Patricia Schroeder, Patricia Ireland and Joy Simonson. Sewall-Belmont House, Washington, D.C.
- June 9, 2001 – Celebrating Heroes of Women's Studies. Honorees included Lois Gould, Lois Herr and Florence Howe. Barnard College, New York City.
- April 26, 2002 – "Salute to Feminist Authors: Celebrating Feminist Writers who Changed the World, 1966–1985." Honored Erica Jong, Barbara Seaman, Letty Pogrebin, Marilyn French and Marlene Sanders. Barnard College, New York City.
- November 6, 2003 – "Celebrating Feminist Artists Who Changed The World, 1966–1980." Artists present included Suzanne Benton, Karen LeCocq, Arlene Raven, Fern Shaffer and Sylvia Sleigh. The National Arts Club, New York City.
- May 2004 – Celebrating 40 years of Title VII. Panelists included Eleanor Clift, Aileen Hernandez and Lorena Weeks. Newton, Massachusetts.
- April 16, 2005 – "Feminism And Its Values: An Intergenerational Dialogue." Honoring Connecticut feminists, including Barbara Lifton. Cromwell, Connecticut.
- May 2006 – Honoring Helen Reddy and Judith Meuli. Feminist Majority building, Los Angeles.
- November 13, 2006 – Two-day event celebrating the debut of "Feminists Who Changed America, 1963–1975" and honoring editor Barbara Love. Also present was Bettye Lane. Columbia University and Barnard College, New York City.
- May 6, 2007 – Saluting Arizona feminists, including Himilce Novas. Phoenix, Arizona.
- October 13, 2007 – Celebrating Washington, DC-area feminists, including Helen Thomas. Sewall-Belmont House, Washington, D.C.
- June 9, 2008 – "Salute to Feminist Lawyers, 1963–1975." Honorees included Supreme Court Justice Ruth Bader Ginsburg, Faith Seidenberg, Sonia Fuentes and Karen DeCrow. Harvard Club, New York City.
- April 20, 2009 – Honoring Florida feminists. Speaker was Patricia Ireland. Palm Aire Country Club, Pompano Beach.
- March 2010 – "The Gender Agenda: Beyond Borders – Pursuing Women's Rights at Home and Abroad." Honored Texas activists including Sissy Farenthold and Virginia Whitehill. Women's Museum, Dallas.
- June 24, 2012 – "A Love Fest For Kate Millett." Speakers included Gloria Steinem, Susan Brownmiller, Alix Kates Shulman, Barbara Love, and Noreen Connell. Judson Church, New York City.
- September 15, 2012 – "Empowering Women: A Tale Of Two Generations." Speakers included Congresswoman Gwen Moore, Lynn Povich, Kathleen Falk, and Judy Goldsmith. Alverno College. Milwaukee.
- September 7, 2013 – "Women and Media" and VFA's 20th anniversary celebration. Honorees included Gloria Allred, Helen Reddy, June Millington, and Carol Downer. Sheraton Universal Hotel, Los Angeles.
- September 27, 2014 – "Labor & the Women's Movement: The untold story and why it matters." Speakers included Alice Kessler-Harris, Karen Nussbaum and Sarita Gupta. Missouri feminists were honored. Renaissance Grand Hotel, St. Louis.
- October 21, 2014 – A lifetime achievement award was presented to Muriel Fox for her years of commitment to women's issues. Also receiving VFA Spirit Awards and VFA's Medal of Honor were Gloria Steinem, Rosie O'Donnell, Marlo Thomas, Eve Ensler and Carol Jenkins. Harvard Club, New York City.
- June 10, 2017 – "Feminist Reunion 2017 – We Won't Go Back." Among those attending were Kate Millett, Susan Brownmiller, Yolanda Bako, Alix Kates Shulman, Heather Booth and Muriel Fox. Judson Memorial Church, New York City.
- November 9, 2017 – Memorial Service for Kate Millett – About 500 people attended the celebration of life for Kate Millett. Speakers included Gloria Steinem, Yoko Ono, Holly Near and Kathleen Turner. Fourth Universalist Society Unitarian Universal Church, New York City.

== See also ==
- List of feminists
- List of women's rights activists
- List of women's rights organizations
- Barbara J. Love; Nancy F Cott (April 17, 2015). Feminists Who Changed America, 1963-1975. University of Illinois Press. pp. 6–. ISBN 978-0-252-09747-8.
