= Mary Jean Collins =

American activist

- Born: December 8, 1939 (age 86); Superior, Wisconsin, U.S.
- Education: Alverno College (BA)

Mary Jean Collins (born December 8, 1939) is an American feminist. She was president of the Chicago chapter of the National Organization for Women (NOW), a member of the national board and director of the campaign to have the Equal Rights Amendment (ERA) ratified in Illinois. She led anti-discrimination protests against Sears and AT&T.

== Early life ==
Collins was born on December 8, 1939, in Superior, Wisconsin. She received a degree in history with a minors in English and theology from Alverno College. While studying, she was encouraged by the nuns to become involved in the women's movement. She worked in an administrative role at Taylor Electric, Allied Radio Corporation and Westinghouse Electric Corporation. She worked for the Illinois Nurses Association in the collective bargaining program between 1975 and 1979 and then for Catholics for a Free Choice in 1985.

== Activism ==
She joined the National Organization for Women (NOW) in 1967 as an officer in the Milwaukee chapter. In 1968, she moved to Chicago, Illinois, where she joined the local NOW chapter and was elected as president. The chapter sponsored the Women's Strike for Equality, which took place in 1970. Collins was the Midwest regional director between 1970 and 1972 and served as the president of the Chicago chapter of NOW between 1978 and 1980, becoming the executive director of the chapter in 1979. While she was regional director, she helped to found chapters in thirteen Midwest states on a budget of $100. She was a member of the NOW board of directors from 1972 to 1975, with responsibility for task forces. In 1974, she ran for president against Karen DeCrow but lost by a narrow margin. She was elected at the national level as the co-director of the Equal Rights Amendment (ERA) campaign from 1980 to 1982 and as vice president for action from 1982 to 1985.

Collins was the director of the Illinois ERA campaign to coordinate the ratification of the amendment by the Illinois General Assembly. She took a year off work to focus on this task. She was also co-chair of the Sears Task Force at NOW, alongside Anne Ladky, which fought discrimination by Sears, then the largest employer of women in the world. She also lead anti-discrimination efforts against AT&T.

She was elected to the board of directors of the Veteran Feminists of America. She is also a director of Catholics for Choice, a member of the Choice USA Commission, and vice president and national political director of People for the American Way.

== Honors ==
She is one of the protagonists of the feminist history film She's Beautiful When She's Angry. Some of her papers are held by the Schlesinger Library at the Radcliffe Institute for Advanced Study at Harvard University.
