= Eleanor Pam =

American political activist (born 1936)

Eleanor Pam (born June 24, 1936, in Brooklyn, New York) is the President of the Veteran Feminists of America.

== Childhood and education ==
Eleanor Pam's parents were Simon and Berta Pam. She has three brothers. In her biography for "Feminist of the Month," she writes that even though she had skipped grades three times due to her academic success, was placed throughout high school in a program for Gifted Students and received the History and Creative Writing Medals at graduation, she was "programmed to become a secretary, get married and procreate promptly." Her brothers, however, were expected to go to college and seek "professional" jobs. Growing up, Pam realized that her surrounding culture valued males over females, and this motivated her to overcome what she believed to be a gender handicap by excelling athletically and academically.

Eleanor attended PS152 Elementary School, Arthur S. Somers Junior High 252 and Thomas Jefferson High school. Her classmates and friends, as did everyone in her neighborhood, were applying to free, city-run local colleges. However, she wanted to go to an out-of-state private school that was academically superior and could give her a more expanded experience of the world beyond her urban, working class neighborhood. This led her to Brandeis University, where she graduated with a BA (and Honors in Philosophy) in 1958 as well as receiving two Master's degrees (1960, 1962) and later received her Ph.D. (1968) from New York University.

== Career ==
Pam's first job was a part-time job in Manhattan as a filing clerk, for the Metropolitan Life Insurance Company. She was a high school senior at the time and sought work to help pay for her college education at Brandeis. It was a highly competitive college and she (and the family) had very little money, but she was accepted and received a scholarship.

After graduating, she wanted to "give back" to her community, so she returned to her old neighborhood of Brownsville and taught for five years at a Special Service School for disadvantaged youths. Pam then found employment at a high school in Levittown, New York as a Guidance Counselor.

In her 20s, Pam became a Professor, Dean, Executive Assistant to the President, Labor Relations Designee and Director of Special Programs at one of the colleges at the City University of New York. At the time only 1% of the female faculty were full professors- the highest level in the academic ladder, but Pam was able to achieve that rank in record time. There she created the first Women's Center. The Center offered counseling services and legal assistance, covering areas such as finance. These legal assistances covered areas such as help in finance, health and mental health, employment, divorce, custody, sexual abuse, and mortgage applications for many women who needed it. The Women's Center became headquarters for intense feminist political activity within the University, led and supported by Pam. She also spearheaded and helped draft a major sex discrimination class action lawsuit against the University on behalf of female faculty and staff, the first of its kind, which was favorably settled after ten years of litigation. It became a model for such class actions at colleges all over the United States.

While holding senior-level management positions in the university, Pam was simultaneously working towards her doctoral degree and also teaching graduate level course as an adjunct professor at New York University's Graduate Division.

Pam joined the National Organization for Women in 1966 or 1967. She co-founded NOW's first Education Committee with her friend, Kate Millett, where she served as its Vice President. Their work became the foundation for many studies and a raised national consciousness about the systematic bias against girls and women that infected the entire educational system. This resulted in dramatic changes to gender-based educational practices in the United States and other countries. It was also the precursor for Title IX.

Pam was invited by Mayor of New York City, Rudolph Giuliani, to join his Commission to Combat Family Violence. She served on the Commission, pro bono, for 8 years.

Pam was a visiting professor at the John Jay College of Criminal Justice and founded its first Domestic Violence Center and became its Director there.

Together with other activists and feminist organizations she worked on passing the anti-stalking law for the state of New York; it took ten years for the bill to pass.

== Feminist activism ==
Aside from fighting on all fronts for gender equality and women's rights, Dr. Pam's feminist activism eventually became centered around issues relating to violence against women: Rape, sexual harassment, domestic violence, women in prison.

She was invited twice by the FBI to participate in think-tanks at their Behavioral Science Unit in Quantico, Virginia. The groups addressed the epidemic of enforcement personnel who abuse their intimate partners. At the first conference, "Domestic Violence by Police Officer," held in September 1998, she served as its Special Advisor and was a guest panelist on the FBI's in-house television system (FBITN) which broadcasts programs into police stations across the country. The second conference, "Suicide and Law Enforcement," was held in September 1999. There, she presented a paper, "Police Homicide/Suicide in Relation to Domestic Violence."

One of Pam's most memorable moments in feminism was her participation on August 26, 1970 in the historic march down Fifth Avenue titled as, "The Women's Strike for Equality," in commemoration of the 50th anniversary of women winning the vote. She shares that it was when she observed the unexpectedly massive size and enthusiasm of the crowds who showed up that she realized they had a Movement. "Prior to that, we all believed that we were just a scattered group of women who were committed to women's equality but that we had not yet become inculcated into the culture or had mass and mainstream support."

== Recognition ==
In October 2011, she was given The Kate Millett Award, presented by Gloria Steinem at Rollins College, for her "extraordinary contributions to feminism: Activism, Vision, Compassion, Courage." Eleanor has stated that she found this memory and Award to be "memorable, humbling and gratifying."

Eleanor Pam also has received two medals of honor from the Veteran Feminists of America. The first in 2001, at Barnard College, New York City, for "Contributions to Feminist Education Inside and Outside the Traditional Classroom" and "For the Founding and Directing the First Women's Center at the City University of New York." The second in 2002, at Florida Atlantic University, Boca Raton, for "honoring Founders of NOW, Early Activists, Pioneer Feminists."

Pam was also presented with an Award of Appreciation by her University union (Professional Staff Conference) at the Graduate Center of City University of New York on April 13, 1999. The presenter, First Vice-President, Richard Boris, observed that "Professor Pam has a long history of feminist activism" and is known "as a counselor and advisor to women all over the university."

Additionally, she was recognized by the CUNY (City of New York) Women's Coalition in an award ceremony, May 1992 for "Service, Scholarship, Leadership and Continued Advocacy on Behalf of the Faculty and Students of the City University of New York" and earlier by Fordham University, December 13, 1988 "...in acknowledgement of Distinguished Service to Education and in Appreciation of Leadership."

Pam has actively utilized the media on behalf of her many feminist causes and has appeared on every major network and cable station, as well as multiple programs with large audience reach such as The Oprah Winfrey Show in October 2010. She has been interviewed by numerous major newspapers, including the New York Times and Washington Post, as well as magazines like People and Newsweek.

== Personal life ==
Married attorney Robert Juceam, on May 24, 1970. Together they had three children: Daniel James Juceam, Jacquelyn Brooke Juceam, and Gregory Andrew Juceam.

Dr. Pam also has five grandchildren: Jordan, Jake, Ezra, Sarah, and Rachel.

Addresses include: Delray Beach, Florida; Manhasset, New York; and East Hampton, New York.
