= She's Beautiful When She's Angry =

2014 documentary film by Mary Dore

- Directed by: Mary Dore
- Produced by: Mary Dore; Nancy Kennedy; Abigail Disney; Geralyn Dreyfous; Gini Reticker
- Cinematography: Svetlana Cvetko
- Edited by: Nancy Kennedy; Kate Taverna
- Music by: Mark Degli Antoni
- Release date: December 5, 2014
- Running time: 92 minutes
- Country: United States
- Language: English

She's Beautiful When She's Angry is a 2014 American documentary film about some of the women involved in the second-wave feminist movement in the United States. It was directed by Mary Dore and co-produced by Nancy Kennedy.

== Overview ==
She's Beautiful When She's Angry documents the Women's Liberation Movement in the United States. It showcases the activist's key concerns during the years 1966–1971 including employment discrimination, affordable childcare, reproductive health, and sexuality, which collectively became known as "women's issues". It also delves into the divisive sides of the movement, such as homophobia, race, and class.

The documentary runs for 92 minutes and features a mixture of archival footage, press clippings, present day interview narration, and readings of contemporary works. It begins by outlining the social climate of the 1960s and describes some of the first events of the women's liberation, including the publication of Betty Friedan's landmark text The Feminine Mystique and the founding of the National Organization for Women. It describes how the women's movement linked to other movements in the United States such as the civil rights movement, the antiwar movement, and the New Left. Also featured in the documentary are the authors of the landmark feminist book Our Bodies, Ourselves and ex-members of the underground abortion organization the Jane Collective. The documentary ends with coverage of the 1970 Women's Strike for Equality and the lasting accomplishments of the movement.

It features the following activists, shown here in alphabetical order:

- Chude Pamela Allen
- Alta
- Judith Arcana
- Fran Beal
- Heather Booth
- Rita Mae Brown
- Susan Brownmiller
- Linda Burnham
- Jacqueline Ceballos
- Mary Jean Collins
- Roxanne Dunbar-Ortiz
- Susan Griffin
- Muriel Fox
- Jo Freeman
- Carol Giardina
- Karla Jay
- Kate Millett
- Eleanor Holmes Norton
- Denise Oliver-Vélez
- Trina Robbins
- Ruth Rosen
- Vivian Rothstein
- Marlene Sanders
- Alix Kates Shulman
- Ellen Shumsky
- Marilyn Webb
- Virginia Whitehill
- Ellen Willis
- Nona Willis-Aronowitz
- Alice Wolfson
- Women of the Our Bodies, Ourselves Collective

== Production ==
She's Beautiful When She's Angry was directed and produced by first-time documentarian Mary Dore, who was herself active in the Women's Liberation Movement during the mid-1970s. It was co-produced by Nancy Kennedy. The filmmakers said they made the documentary to inspire people to continue to advocate for gender equality.

The rights to the film were bought by Music Box Films in 2016 who released it on DVD and iTunes. In 2018, the film was available on Netflix.

== Reception ==
The documentary debuted in New York City on December 5, 2014, and in Los Angeles on December 12, 2014. It continued to screen across the United States and other countries including Canada, Australia, Turkey, South Korea, Ireland, and Spain. As of August 2024, the film has a score of 80 on Metacritic based on 12 critic reviews.

=== Critical reception ===
Jordan Hoffman of The Guardian gave the film three out of five stars calling it a "well-deserved appreciation of these women", but criticized the film's sometimes disjointed approach. Alan Scherstuhl of The Village Voice described the documentary as the best filmed account of how the women's movement "changed the workplace, our sexual politics, our language." Ann Hornaday of The Washington Post gave the documentary two and a half out of four stars, citing "awkward reenactments and other stylistic clunkers" but concluded that "it serves as a moving reminder of how crucial citizen action is in fomenting social change."
