= Muriel Fox =

American activist (born 1928)

- Born: February 3, 1928 (age 98)
- Education: Barnard College
- Occupations: Public relations executive, feminist activist
- Organization: National Organization for Women
- Website: murielfox.com

Muriel Fox (born February 3, 1928) is an American public relations executive and feminist activist.

== Childhood and education ==
Muriel Fox's parents were Anne Rubenstein Fox and M. Morris Fox. In 1980, Muriel said (at a Mother's Day rally for the Equal Rights Amendment) that a large inspiration for her feminist activism was her mother's unhappiness at being a housewife. She had a brother, Jerry, who died in 1988 at age 55.

She graduated from Weequahic High School in 1945.

She graduated summa cum laude and Phi Beta Kappa from Barnard College in 1948, having transferred there from Rollins College.

== Career ==
After graduation from college she worked as an advertising copywriter for Sears Roebuck in New York, then as a publicist for Tom Jefferson & Associates in Miami, Florida, where she headed the Dade County re-election campaign of Senator Claude Pepper and helped elect Miami Mayor William M. Wolfarth.

In 1950, she applied for a job at Carl Byoir & Associates, which was then the world's largest public relations agency, but was rejected by the Executive Vice President of the agency, who stated, "We don't hire women writers." In the same year, she was hired as a publicist in Carl Byoir & Associates' Radio-TV Department. In 1952, she was head of that department, and in 1956 she became the agency's youngest vice president. She was then told she had "progressed as far as she could go because corporate CEOs can't relate to women." It was not until the 1970s that she became Executive Vice President of the agency. She was described in Business Week Magazine's list of 100 Top Corporate Women in June 1976 as the "top-ranking woman in public relations." In 1985, she retired from the agency.

She also served as president of Byoir subsidiaries ByMedia (communications training) and ByMart (smaller accounts).

She also served on the board of Rorer Pharmaceuticals from 1979 to 1993, chairing its Nominating Committee, and on the board of directors of Harleysville Mutual Insurance Company from 1976 to 2000, chairing its Audit Committee.

== Feminist activism ==
In 1965–68, she and Senator Maurine Neuberger co-chaired then-vice president Hubert Humphrey's task force on Women's Goals.

In 1966, she co-founded the National Organization for Women (NOW), and she was NOW president Betty Friedan's main lieutenant and director of operations in its earliest years. She also helped edit NOW's original Statement of Purpose (1966). In 1967, she organized NOW's New York chapter, and she founded and edited NOW's first national newsletter (1970–1971). She was the head of public relations for NOW and eventually served as NOW's vice president (1967–1970), chair of its board (1971–1973), and chair of its national advisory committee (1973–1974). In 1975, she organized a successful meeting between NOW officers and Byoir client Sesame Street, which headed off a planned NOW boycott while also resulting in increased participation of female characters on the influential TV show.

In 1970, she was a co-founder of the NOW Legal Defense and Education Fund (NOWLDEF); she served on its board of directors in 1974, and also served as its vice president (1977–1978), president (1978–1981), chair of its board (1981–1992), and honorary chair of its board (1993–present). For NOWLDEF she organized and chaired The National Assembly on the Future of the Family (1979), convening 2,100 civic leaders in the first public forum that highlighted the modern-day transformation of the American family. Also in 1979, she created NOWLDEF's annual Equal Opportunity Awards Dinner, and she co-chaired it for 22 years with co-chairs including prominent corporate American CEOs. She also chaired NOWLDEF's Convocation on New Leadership in the Public Interest (1981), to persuade leaders of business, government, labor, and public policy to be feminist allies.

She was a co-founder in 1974, and the second president in 1976–78, of the Women's Forum of New York, an organization of prominent women whose stated goal was originally to "bring together women of diverse accomplishments and provide them with a forum for the exchange of ideas and experiences. By thus becoming aware of their counterparts in all fields, and of mutual interests and attitudes, they can, when desired, speak in concert on issues confronting the total community."

Beginning in 1993, she chaired the board of Veteran Feminists of America; for them she organized and chaired conferences such as their Salute To Feminist Authors and their Salute To Feminist Artists.

She was a Senior Editor of the book Feminists Who Changed America (2006).

She raised millions of dollars for feminist causes.

She lectured throughout the world on feminism and "Moving Women Up the Corporate Ladder," among other topics. In speeches she often urged successful women to abandon their old roles as "Queen Bee" in a man's world. Her most frequent speechline was a call urging successful women to say, "Yes, I am a feminist."

At the age of 94 she wrote The Women's Revolution: How We Changed Your Life, published by New Village Press, June 18, 2024.

== Recognition ==
In 1977, she received a Matrix Award from New York Women in Communications. In 1979, she was the first woman to win a Business Leader of the Year Award, and in 1983, she received an Achievement Award from the Alliance for Women in Media, then known as American Women in Radio & Television.

In 1985, she received the Distinguished Alumna Award from Barnard College. She also became the first recipient of New York State NOW's Eleanor Roosevelt Leadership Award.

In 1991, the NOW Legal Defense and Education Fund created the Muriel Fox Award for Communications Leadership Toward a Just Society, also called the "Foxy"; Muriel Fox was its first recipient. In 1996, the Fund granted her an "Our Hero" award "For a Lifetime of Dedication to the Cause of Women's Equality."

In 1997, she received the Caroline Lexow Babcock Award from Rockland County NOW. In 2008, she received the Distinguished Citizen Award from the Rockland County Family Shelter, the Woman of Accomplishment Award from the Wings Club, and the Woman to Women Award from New York State NOW. In 2016, she won NOW's Woman of Vision Award.

On October 21, 2014 Gloria Steinem presented her with the Lifetime Achievement Award of Veteran Feminists of America in a luncheon at the Harvard Club in Midtown Manhattan, featuring appearances by feminists Eve Ensler, Rosie O'Donnell, Marlo Thomas and Carol Jenkins.

Fox is featured in the feminist history film She's Beautiful When She's Angry (2014).

In 2017, she was inducted into PRWeek's Hall of Fame. In 2018, she was inducted into the Rockland Women Leaders Hall of Fame. In 2019, she received an Elly Award from The Women's Forum of New York.

In 2024, she was named Lifetime Champion Honoree by Legal Momentum, where she served as president, vice president, and board chair of the Board of Directors.

In May 2024, she received a Clara Lemlich Award; the Clara Lemlich Awards “honor women who have been working for the larger good their entire lives, in the tradition of those who sparked so many reforms in the aftermath of the Triangle Shirtwaist Factory fire over one hundred years ago”.

She is listed in Who's Who In America, Who's Who In The World, Foremost Women of the Twentieth Century, Who's Who Of American Women, and Feminists Who Changed America, the last of which was edited by Barbara Love.

"Papers of NOW officer Muriel Fox, 1966–1971" is at the Arthur and Elizabeth Schlesinger Library on the History of Women in America, Radcliffe Institute for Advanced Study, Harvard University.

== Personal life ==
She married Dr. Shepard G. Aronson in 1955.
