= Lebanon County (Pennsylvania) Women's Hall of Fame =

The Lebanon County, Pennsylvania Women’s Hall of Fame was established by the county's Commission for Women in 2010 to "...preserve women’s history, and honor the outstanding achievements of unsung heroes in our community." The following list details those individual inductions. As of the 2020 US Census count, Lebanon County, Pennsylvania has a population of 143,257, of which 50.8% are women. The county labor force is composed of 58.3% women.

== 2026 ==
Presentation ceremony March 18, 2026

- Lori Brandt
- Deborah Clancy
- Jane Hollinger Clark
- Amanda Davis-Buie
- Ivette Guzmán Zavala
- Tami Kohr
- Jessica Kosoff
- Emmily Longenecker
- Laura McHugh
- Deb Waters
- Rebecca Witherite

== 2025 ==
Presentation ceremony March 19, 2025

- Deborah Buckfelder
- Caitlin Kurtz
- Bonnie Loy
- Dianne Marquette
- Alissa Mailen Perrotto
- Kerry Royer
- Doris Iannicelli (1924–2014)

== 2024 ==
Presentation ceremony March 20, 2024

- Lori Baker (Pennsylvania)
- Loreen Burkett
- Laurie Funk
- Janet Garchinsky
- Lois Herr
- Susan Hostetter
- Catherine Simone
- Lisa Spencer
- Joanne Wendte
- Georgie Wilson

== 2023 ==
Presentation ceremony March 22, 2023

- Lori Burrus
- Laurie A. Crawford
- Betsy Dorsey
- Rachel Etter
- Jennifer Kuzo
- Lynne M. Lowe
- Carmen Medina (Pennsylvania)
- Heidi Neiswender
- Harmonie J. Sherk
- Christine Smith (Pennsylvania)
- Katie Trainer

== 2022 ==
Presentation ceremony March 25, 2022

- Guadalupe Barba

Founder, along with her husband, of Junto de Lebanon, an informational liaison service for the Spanish-speaking community

- Frances Campbell

Volunteerism and community support advocate

- Tammy Cassell

Executive Director of P.R.O.B.E.

- Vicki Deloatch

CFO Lebanon Family Health Services

- Miriam Enck

Co-founder of East Indies Coffee and Tea Company

- Mildred Hernandez

American Red Cross volunteer

- Francy Reigert

Teacher, Lebanon School District

- Joy Riley

Tennis pro

- Kerrie Smedley

Owner, Annville Psychological Services

- Melanie Wells, M.A.

Wellspan Good Samaritan Hospital, community programs

- Andrea Whelan

Pennsylvania Army National Guard

== 2020 ==
- Stephanie Andreozzi

Senior Director, Clinical Services, at WellSpan Good Samaritan Hospital.

- Cheryl Batdorf

Financial advisor.

- Laurie Bowersox

Executive Director of the Lebanon Campus of the Harrisburg Area Community College.

- Janice Buckingham

Creator of the local Alzheimer’s Association/Dementia Support Group of Eastern Lebanon County.

- Judith Jo Clark

Licensed Professional Counselor and Certified Alcohol & Drug Counselor.

- Christina Davis (education)

Instructor and supervisor with Lancaster-Lebanon IU13 for 35 years.

- Jennifer DyReyes

Director of Global Systems and Robotic Process Automation at ADP, a Fortune 250 company.

- Norma Iris Gonzalez

Trailblazer, Director of Therapy at the Sexual Assault Resources and Counseling Center.

- Jenny Murphy-Shifflet

Trailblazer, retired President/CEO of the Sexual Assault Resource and Counseling Center of Lebanon and Schuylkill Counties.

- Joanna Guldin-Noll

Social Media Manager for Military.com, and also is the co-owner of Swatara Coffee Company.

- Meghan Winslow

Art teacher and mentor. Founder of SPLAT art studio.

== 2019 ==
- Jennifer Bower

Community Service. Supervisor and co-owner of Domino's Pizza franchises in Lebanon and Myerstown.

- Gloria Ebling

President of the Myerstown Planning Commission.

- Cindy Heisey

Trailblazer, Lebanon County Commission for Women and multiple other projects.

- Renee Krizan

Associate Artistic Director at Gretna Theatre.

- Gretchen Oberst

Educator, Agricultural Education at Northern Lebanon High School.

- Susan Szydlowski

Board member of Lebanon Family Health Services.

- Erin Ulrich

Clinical Education Coordinator for the Athletic Training Program at Lebanon Valley College.

- Cindy Van Aken

Family Engagement Coordinator at the Lebanon School District.

- Pamela Weiss

First woman lawyer in Lebanon County to practice family law.

- Jan Wessell

Founding member of Support Connections of Lebanon County, Inc.

- Margaret Wilson (Registered nurse)

Retired Captain, United States Navy, Associate Director for Patient Care Services VA Lebanon health care.

== 2018 ==
- Linda Bell (The Arts)

Mount Gretna Art Show and Gretna Theater.

- Josephine Ames

Business woman.

- Patricia Bachman (1959–2016)

Principal of Pine Street Elementary School.

- Tracie Clemens

Trailblazer, Director of Elementary Education and Federal Programs with the Cornwall Lebanon School District.

- Jessica Dreibelbis

Lebanon County Special Olympics.

- Debra Gingrich

Volunteerism.

- Marsha Novick

Director of the Pediatric Multidisciplinary Weight Loss Program at the Penn State Hershey Children’s Hospital.

- Shila Ulrich

Director of The Caring Cupboard.

- Kimberly Kreider Umble

Trailblazer, President and CEO of Lebanon Family Health Services.

- Gwendolyn Ward

Girl Scouts in Lebanon County, founding board member of Female Offenders Re-Entry Program.

== 2017 ==
- Susan Allwein (1943–2020)

Co-founder of Allwein’s Flooring Center and Allwein’s Cleaning Services.

- Nori Fisher

Trailblazer, community volunteer.

- Mary Gardner

Swimming coach.

- Marianne Goodfellow

Professor at Penn State University, Lebanon Valley College Department of Sociology and Criminal Justice.

- Maryann Guldin

Northern Lebanon High School teacher, created Child Development Playgroup. Pennsylvania Association of Family and Consumer Sciences Teacher of the Year in 2014, and in 2015 was an American Association of Family and Consumer Science National Teacher of the Year Merit Finalist.

- Beryl Hoffman

Membership and leadership in several Arts organizations.

- Jennie Horstick (1923–2020)

Trailblazer, founded Palmyra Garden Club.

- Linda Krall

President of Farm Women’s group, county President of the Lebanon County Farm Women.

- Lillian Morales

Participation in Lebanon County Community Action Partnership and many civic groups.

- Amy Schaffer-Duong

Science and Technology.

- Phyllis Weiant and Amanda Musser

Mother and daughter promoting healthy lifestyles to combat cancer.

- Priscilla Wolf

Board of Directors for Halcyon Activity Center. Flautist and board member in the Lebanon Community Concert Band; flautist in the Ephrata Community Band.

== 2016 ==
- Ashley Durniak

Co-creator of Sonrise Academy.

- Karen Groh

Board member of YMCA Camp Shand, Community of Lebanon Association (CLA), Lancaster, and Lebanon Valley Chamber of Commerce (LVCC).

- Courtney Hershey

Co-creator of Sonrise Academy.

- Mary Burchik Huber

Trailblazer, Attorney

- Julie Sykes Kaylor

Created the Lebanon County Gleaning Network, which coordinates with local growers to distribute excess fruit and vegetable harvests to needy individuals and families.

- Karla Ludwig

Medical Director of the Oncology Program at the WellSpan Good Samaritan Hospital.

- Rebecca Reed (teacher)

Software developer.

- Michelle Remlinger

Promoting healthy lifestyles.

- Emi Snavely

Board of Directors of Gretna Music.

- Hazel Swisher (1940–2021)

Lebanon County Deputy Sheriff, two terms as District Justice, Outstanding Business Woman of Lebanon County for 1991–1992.

- Kristen Watts

Banking industry.

== 2015 ==
- Marianne Bartley

Retired superintendent Lebanon School District.

- Jennifer Davis

Owner of Dental Art Images.

- Jennifer Gettle

Chief Deputy District Attorney for Dauphin County.

- Rebecca Gacono Harlan

Trailblazer, Co-owner of Prudential Gacono Real Estate, Annville Community Activities Committee, Lebanon Daily News “Citizen of the Year” in 2008.

- Patti Hower

Head coach of the Lebanon Catholic Girls Basketball team. 2011 inductee of the Pennsylvania Sports State Hall of Fame, 2013 inductee of the Central Chapter of the Pennsylvania Sports Hall of Fame. 1995 Coach of the Year by the Pennsylvania Scholastic Girls Coaching Association.

- Shirley Krall

Dairy farmer, Pennsylvania Agriculture Spokesperson Award.

- Beverly Martel

Leadership, two-time president of Northern Lebanon Rotary Club.

- Dorothy Perez

Performing arts, visual arts, and literary arts.

- Tracie Seiders

State Auxiliary Hospital Representative to Lebanon Veterans Administration Hospital.

- Cynthia Smith (Pennsylvania)

Agape Family Shelter and the Operation Santa program.

- Linda Umberger (1941–2011)

Four decades as a registered nurse at Lebanon Veteran’s Administration Medical Center.

== 2014 ==
- Ann Marie Brewer

Community service, president of military Auxiliary Post 910 and Secretary of the Legion Riders Post 910.

- Cynthia Bowman-Condor

Registered nurse, chairperson for the Sexual Assault Response Team.

- Carol Christ (Pennsylvania)

Community service, Treasurer and Board Member of the Lebanon County Historical Society.

- Evelyn Colon (Pennsylvania)

Community service.

- Deborah Freer

Trailblazer, Board of the Good Samaritan Hospital.

- Judy Williams Henry

Dancer, actor and international choreographer.

- Elaine Ludwig

Trailblazer, League of Women Voters, served on the Pennsylvania committee for the National Voter Registration Act of 1993.

- Kristy Ludwig

Health care.

- Carol Maurer

Co-founder of the Jack and Jill Preschool.

- Diana Reilly

Community service.

- Emily Simone

Health care.

- Deb Tice

Substitute teacher, farm owner and volunteer 4-H leader.

- Roberta Warshaw

Lebanon County Mediation Services.

== 2013 ==
- Holly Gonyea Dolan

Survivor of a medical stroke at age 27. Began blogging to help others negotiate the maze of health care insurance and claims.

- Karen Dundore-Gullota

Performing arts, literary arts, visual arts.

- Bridget Hofman

Environmental Scientist and Industrial Hygienist.

- Melissa Kulbitsky

Lebanon Valley Council on the Arts (LVCA).

- Pat Krebs

Retired member of Pennsylvania House of Representatives, District 9, community organizer.

- Sandra Meluskey

Trailblazer, career nurse, advocate of community involvement.

- Rita Moore

Leadership in education, along with her husband organized Lebanon Area Adoptive Families.

- Linda Siegel (4-H Extension Educator)

4-H Extension Educator for Penn State Extension in Lebanon County.

- Megan Ryland Tanner

Attorney District Attorney’s Office, primarily prosecuting child abuse and sexual violence against women.

- Jessica Tavara

Governor’s Advisory Commission on Latino Affairs, supporting community social growth.

== 2012 ==
- Julie Bergstresser

Coordinator the Veterans Justice Outreach Program.

- Gina Bouchette

Registered dietitian promoting healthy lifestyles.

- Yasmin Brown

Jewelry designer, owner of Spirit Dancer Designs.

- Catherine Coyle

Trailblazer, Lebanon County’s first elected female District Justice in 1969.

- Mary Dague

Leadership in education.

- Roberta DeSantis

Environmentalist, Greater Lebanon Refuse Authority.

- Priscilla Walker Ebright

Service to military establishments and veterans. Member of Women’s Auxiliary of the Navy Club, USA Ship 91, American Legion Auxiliary and the American Legion Riders. Established a snack bar to help fund the Wounded Warrior Project.

- Diana Hartman

Co-founder of Home Based Business Committee of the Lebanon Valley Chamber of Commerce. 2014 Business Person of the Year and 2007 Lester Leffler Memorial Community Volunteer Service Award for the Community of Lebanon Association.

- Susan Klarsch (1955–2011)

Emeritus Award, Executive Director of Lebanon County Commission on Drug and Alcohol Abuse.

- Kathleen Moe "Kathy"

Community preservationist, co-author with Tanya Richter, of ordinance creating the Annville Township Historical Architectural Review Board (HARB) to preserve historic buildings.

- Catherine Schott

Agriculture, President of the Lebanon County Society of Farm Women, Lebanon Area Fair’s Kitchen Manager.

- Pamela Wildonger

Promoting health care.

== 2011 ==
- Wanda Bechtold

Founded the Central Pennsylvania Supports the Troops in 2003.

- Betty Ross Conner (1930–2020)

Ph.D in microbiology, and has focused her efforts for policies on land use, water quality and quantity. Pennsylvania League of Women Voters, co-founder of Swatara Creek Watershed Association.

- Amy Mazella di Bosco

Lebanon County Recycling Coordinator.

- Judy Feather

Board member of Family and Children Services in Lebanon County. Helped organize the League of Women Voters of Lebanon County.

- Carol Hollich

Director of Music at Trinity United Methodist Church. Secretary of Lebanon County Community Concert Association. Owner of Hollich Studios in Palmyra.

- Marilyn Nolte

Lebanon County Correctional Facility Women’s Chaplain.

- Lorraine Royer

State Farm Women Society President. Member of Lebanon County Farm Women Society, and Lebanon Area Fair Queen Committee.

- Carol Saltzer

Director of Crisis Intervention Services. Chair of the Lebanon Coalition to End Homelessness.

- Redith Snoberger (1942–2017)

Community Trailblazer. Wernersville State Hospital Board of Trustee, president of Sexual Assault Resource Counseling Center.

- Linda Summers (Pennsylvania)

Leadership in education.

- Rose Walmer

Established the “Praise Dinner” program which helped raise $1,100,000 has been raised for religion-based public services.

- Tina Washington

First African American teacher employed by the Lebanon School District.

== 2010 ==
- Ginger Beamesderfer

Plant Leader at AES Ironwood.

- Lisa Brown (Pennsylvania)

Director of Curriculum and Instruction at Annville-Cleona High School.

- Betty Eiceman

Lebanon’s first woman to serve as mayor.

- Peggy J. Hengeveld

Brigadier General Ret. First woman of the Pennsylvania Army National Guard to graduate from the United States Army War College.

- Katherine Hoopes

President of the Lebanon Chapter of the Harmonia Music Club.

- Ann Lasky

Successfully lobbied to convert a limestone quarry into the Quittie Creek Nature Park.

- Alleta Schadler

First female County Extension Office Director in Lebanon County

- Mary Louise Sherk (1925–2008)

Education coordinator for Federal Head Start program.

- Donna Williams (Pennsylvania)

Vice-President of Operations at Lebanon Valley Family Health Services.

- Laurie Yurejefcic

Paralegal with MidPenn Legal Services of Lebanon, PA.

- Sharon Zook

Revitalization of the South Sixth Street Playground.
