= Linda Stein =

Linda Stein may refer to:

- Linda Stein (artist) (born 1943), American feminist sculptor and writer
- Linda S. Stein (1945–2007), ex-manager of the Ramones, later "Realtor to the Stars"
