= Carol Jenkins (activist) =

American women's rights activist

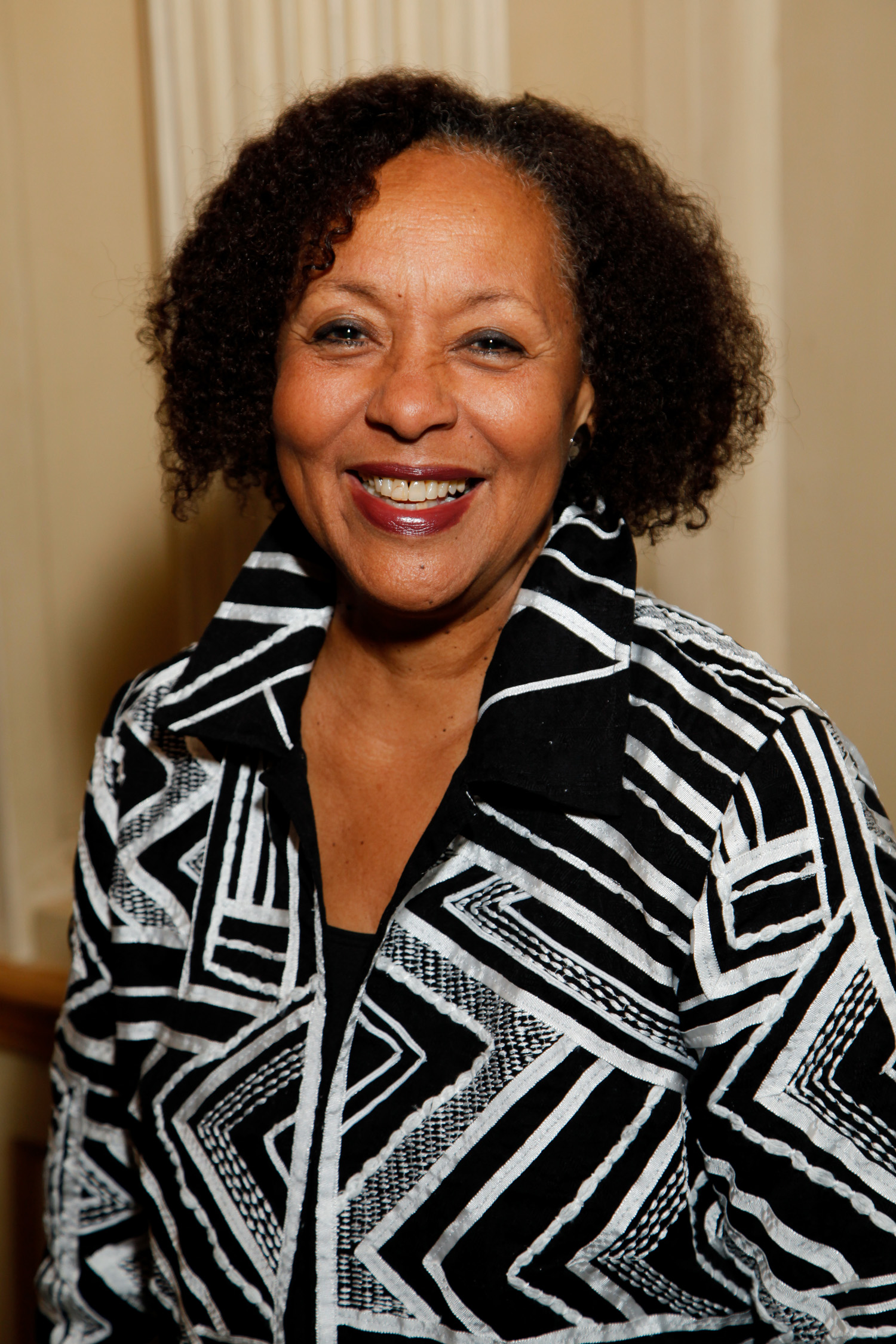
- Education: Wheelock College (B.A.); New York University (M.A.)
- Occupations: Women's rights activist, author, television host
- Notable work: Black Titan: A. G. Gaston and the Making of a Black American Millionaire (2004)
- Relatives: A. G. Gaston (uncle)
- Website: https://caroljenkinsmedia.com/

Carol Jenkins is an American women's rights activist, author, television host, and former television journalist.

== Education ==
Carol Jenkins earned a B.A. in 1966 from Wheelock College, which has since merged with Boston University, and an M.A. from New York University. Both universities honored her as a distinguished alumnus.

== Career ==
Early in her career, Jenkins co-hosted one of the first daily public affairs programs in New York City, Straight Talk on WOR-TV; and co-hosted Positively Black for WNBC-TV, one of the earliest television programs dedicated to Black issues in the United States.

As an African-American television reporter, Jenkins was an anchor and correspondent for WNBC-TV in New York for nearly 25 years. She reported from the floor of national presidential conventions from the 1970s to the 1990s, and from South Africa she reported on the release of Nelson Mandela from prison and co-produced an Emmy-nominated prime-time special on apartheid.

She hosted Carol Jenkins Live, her own daily talk show, on WNYW-TV.

With her daughter, Elizabeth Gardner Hines, Jenkins is co-author of Black Titan: A. G. Gaston and the Making of a Black American Millionaire (2004). A biography of her uncle, a successful Alabama businessman and civil rights activist, the book won a Best Non-Fiction award from the Black Caucus of the American Library Association.

She was founding president of Women's Media Center, a non-profit created in 2004 by Gloria Steinem, Robin Morgan, and Jane Fonda to increase coverage and participation of women in media. As president, she conceived the Progressive Women’s Voices program to provide media training for women and girls, and she expanded SheSource, the largest portfolio of women experts in the country. At FCC hearings she testified on the "crisis in representation" in mainstream media. Every year WMC presents its WMC Carol Jenkins award to women in extraordinary leadership positions.

As a pioneering African-American television reporter, Jenkins was an anchor and correspondent for WNBC TV in New York for nearly 25 years. She reported from the floor of national presidential conventions from the 1970s to the 1990s, and from South Africa she reported on the release of Nelson Mandela from prison and co-produced an Emmy-nominated prime-time special on apartheid.

As past chair and current board member of Amref Health Africa USA, an arm of the largest health NGO in Africa, she is engaged in efforts to support health programs for African women and girls. Her other board work includes the Feminist Press at CUNY, the Veteran Feminists of America, The Steering Committee of the Gloria Steinem Chair at Rutgers University, the Anne O'Hare McCormick Journalism Scholarship Board, the Northern Manhattan Arts Alliance, and Certified Humane.

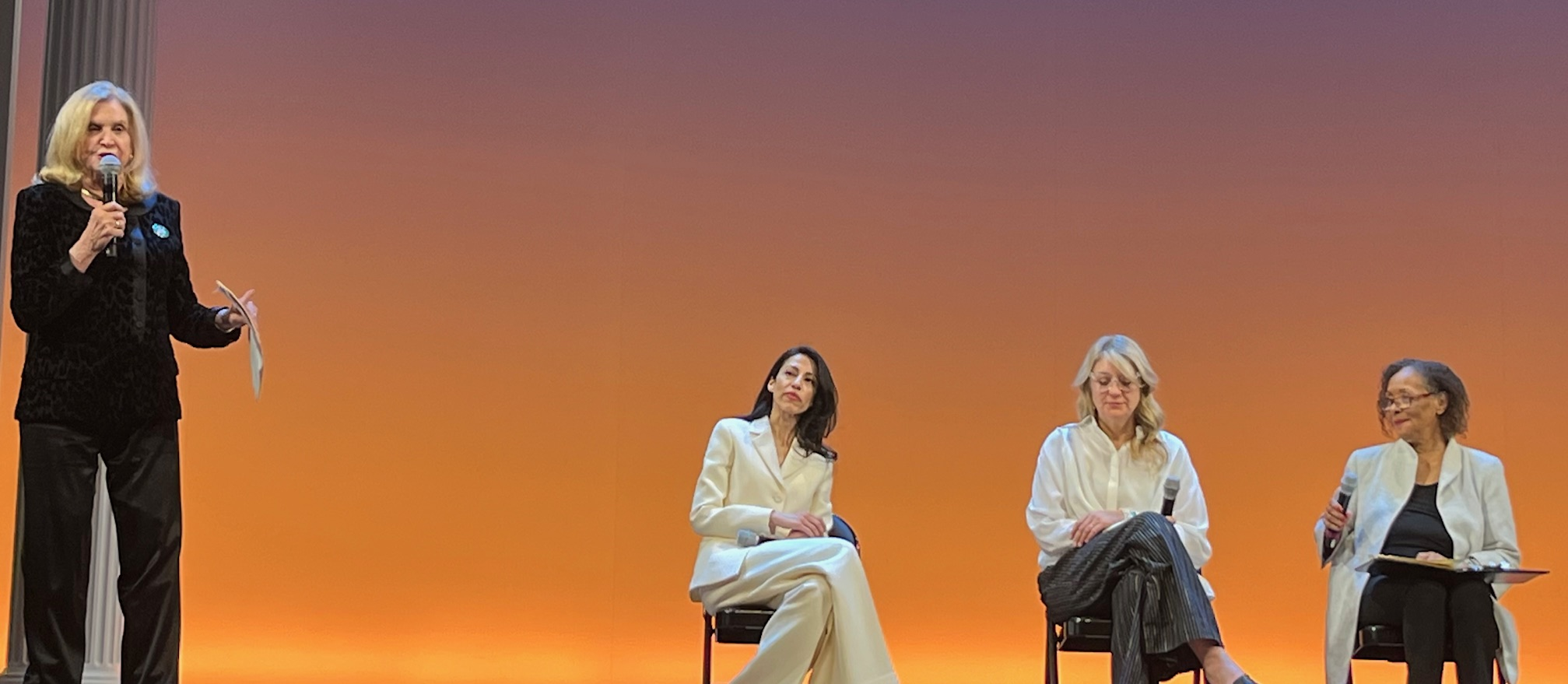
Carol Jenkins alongside Carolyn Maloney, Heidi Schreck and Huma Abedin at ERA night after a performance of Suffs musical in April 2024

Jenkins was co-president and CEO of the ERA Coalition and the Fund for Women's Equality, sister organizations dedicated to the passage and enactment of the Equal Rights Amendment. A board member since the beginning in 2014, she joined the leadership team in December 2018, and left in 2022, replaced by Zakiya Thomas.

The ERACoalition comprises more than two hundred and fifty organizations and leaders across the US, representing people working for equality for women. It provides research, education and advocacy on the issues of constitutional equality, working on the state and federal levels with advocates and legislators.

In 2020, the ERA Coalition was supportive of the legislative and advocacy work that brought about the 38th and final state (Virginia) needed for ratification and the House of Representatives vote to dissolve the time limit on the Equal Rights Amendment.

Jenkins hosts the three-time N.Y. Emmy-nominated interview show Black America, on CUNY TV, as of 2021 in its sixth season. She is also executive producer, writer and correspondent of its documentaries, including the PBS-aired More Than a Building, A Dream Come True, an award-winning film detailing the creation of the new National Museum of African American History and Culture in Washington, DC and Conscience of America: Birmingham's Fight for Civil Rights, a special on the Birmingham Civil Rights National Monument, which won a national Telly Award in 2018 and was nominated in the Best Documentary category by the National Association of Black Journalists. The program has been honored by the New York Association of Black Journalists as Best Talk, and Best Documentary.

In 2018, she hosted a limited-edition Black America podcast with Black women leaders, and was also co-anchor of CUNY TV’s live election-night coverage, which dealt with national as well as local races. In the spring of 2019 and 2020, Jenkins was chosen as a Grove Leader at Hunter College, leading a semester seminar on Constitutional Equality and working with a cohort of Grove Fellows to produce a virtual gathering on the ERA on campuses across the US.

== Honors ==
Jenkins holds honorary doctorates from the College of New Rochelle and Marymount Manhattan College. She was a 2017 recipient of the Sackler First Award, given to women who are pioneers in their fields.

Jenkins is a recipient of both Lifetime Achievement and International Reporting Awards from The Association Of Black Journalists/New York Chapter, The 2008 Women's Equality Award from The National Council of Women's Organizations, and the North Star News Prize. Women's eNews recognized Jenkins in 2012 as a "multimedia agitator against bias" and presented her with its Ida B. Wells Award for Bravery in Journalism, and in 2014 she was honored for her life in journalism by Mercy College.

Other honors include those from:

- The Feminist Press
- The Daily News with its Front Page Award
- YWCA
- Girl Scouts of the USA
- Save the Children
- Single Parents’ Association
- United Negro College Fund
- Hale House
- National Mothers' Day Committee as Mother of the Year
- The Police Athletic League as Woman of the Year
- Abbott House as Humanitarian of the Year
