= Bettye Lane =

American photojournalist (1930–2012)

- Bettye Lane at the Washington Square Arch.
- Born: Elisabetta Foti; September 19, 1930; Boston, Massachusetts
- Died: September 19, 2012 (aged 82); New York, New York
- Known for: Photography, photojournalism

Bettye Lane (September 19, 1930, Boston – September 19, 2012, Manhattan) was an American photojournalist known for documenting major events within the feminist movement, the civil rights movement, and the gay rights movement in the United States. She joined CBS television in 1960, and from 1962 to 1964 she was with the Saturday Evening Post. Her work has been published in the National Observer, Time, Life, and the Associated Press.

Lane's work has been exhibited at the Smithsonian Institution and some of her photographs are part of the permanent collection at the National Museum of Women in the Arts. Her work is also part of the collections of the New York Public Library and the libraries at Harvard and Duke University. Her photographs have also been utilized in documentary films and published books.

Lane died on her 82nd birthday.

== Early life ==
Bettye Lane (born Elisabetta Foti) was one of the eight children of Italian immigrants Luigi and Antonietta Foti. After her father returned to Italy, her mother was left struggling to pay the bills and was forced to put her into the care of a wealthier family for a time. Elizabeth was later forced to drop out of elementary school to work in a shoe factory. After a brief marriage to a World War II veteran, she moved to New York, keeping her married name.

== Career ==
Lane became exposed to public relations in 1959 when she began to attend the Boston University School of Public Relations and Communications. Lane finished school in 1962. From 1959 to 1962, Lane was affiliated with the Harvard University News Office, exposing herself to working with current events. Additionally, Lane was hired by CBS television in 1960. Lane's work with public relations and the news, from 1959 to 1962, prepared her for her first job as a photojournalist. In 1962, the Saturday Evening Post hired her as a photo journalist and she worked there until 1964. In 1966, the National Observer hired Lane for the same position and she stayed there until 1977. Lane was hired by the National Observer after she met the newspaper's photo editor at protest in 1966. He was so impressed with her devotion and dedication that he hired her and eventually helped make her become known as the official photographer of the women's movement.

It was during her time working at the National Observer, a New York weekly newspaper, that Lane was given her big break. In 1970, Lane had her first encounter with the women's movement when she was assigned to cover the first Women's Strike for Equality. The protest was organized by the National Organization for Women and fought for women's equality in the workplace. After photographing the Women's Strike for Equality, Lane became obsessed with photographing the women's movement and made it her business to attend and photograph every protest and rally, whether she was assigned to do so or not. It was this dedication that resulted in Lane becoming known as the official photographer of the women's movement.

After leaving the National Observer in 1977, Lane became independent, not tying herself down to a certain publication, however, she took assignments from Time, Life and the Associated Press.

Lane focused her work on civil rights demonstrations, protest during the time Vietnam war and marches for gay rights. She was one of the few photographers to document the Stonewall riots in Greenwich Village, considered the beginning the gay rights movement in the United States.

== Death and legacy ==
Lane died September 19, 2012. Her health problems ranged from stomach cancer to rheumatoid arthritis. She was survived by one sister, Josephine Caton of Boston, and several nephews and nieces.

She is considered "the official photographer of the women's movement". Her photographs have been featured in more than 70 documentaries and books about the Stonewall riots. One of her photos was included in the "Celebrate the Century" US Postal stamp series for 2000. Lesbian author and activist Sarah Schulman wrote "her photos from the era are classics, showing women, men, trans people, drag, and the people of color intrinsic to the movement at the time".

Lane spent the end of her life organizing her photographs and donating them to different organizations to shed light on the history of the women's movement. Her legacy is preserved at the Schlesinger Library at Harvard University, the Library of Congress, the National Museum of Women in the Arts, in Washington, DC, the New York Public Library, and the Rubenstein Library at Duke University.

== Photographs ==
Her photographs stand out from other photographers because while she did photograph the important leaders of the women's movement, Lane photographed everyday, ordinary people during the protests. She found that these photographs captured the emotion and essence of the women's movement better than the photographs of leaders.
