= Women's Walk Against Rape =

Feminist demonstrations against rape from the 1970s

The Women's Walk Against Rape was an annual political demonstration during the 1970s that emerged as part of the broader anti-rape movement. This movement, fueled by second-wave feminism, sought to challenge societal norms and legal frameworks that perpetuated sexual violence against women and marginalized survivors. The demonstrations were pivotal in raising awareness about rape as a systemic issue tied to gender inequality and power dynamics.

== History ==
The anti-rape movement began in the late 1960s and early 1970s, rooted in feminist activism and consciousness-raising efforts. During this time, survivors of sexual violence began to publicly share their experiences through events like Speak Outs, which highlighted the prevalence of rape and the failures of institutions to address it adequately. The Women's Walk Against Rape was part of this wave of activism, aiming to confront societal attitudes that blamed victims and normalized sexual violence. During a protest in Central Park in 1976, Yolanda Bako from the Rape Prevention Committee said "You should have seen the looks on the faces of the night-life-subculture men who regularly roam the park. They could not stand the fact that we were invading their space".

== Goals ==
The Women's Walk Against Rape sought to raise public awareness about the systemic nature of sexual violence, and challenge institutional responses that re-traumatized survivors, such as insensitive police investigations, inadequate hospital care, and biased legal proceedings. Additionally, it also advocated for legal reforms, including the recognition of marital rape as a crime, the introduction of rape shield laws, and changes to consent definitions.

These marches often involved survivors, activists, and allies walking through public spaces with banners, placards, and chants. They were characterized by their nonviolent approach and emphasis on solidarity among women across racial and class lines.

== See also ==
- Anti-rape movement
- Take Back the Night (organization)
- Reclaim the Night
- SlutWalk
- Ni Putes Ni Soumises
