= Lebanon High School (Pennsylvania) =

Public high school in Pennsylvania, United States

Coordinates: 40.3263°N 76.4209°W

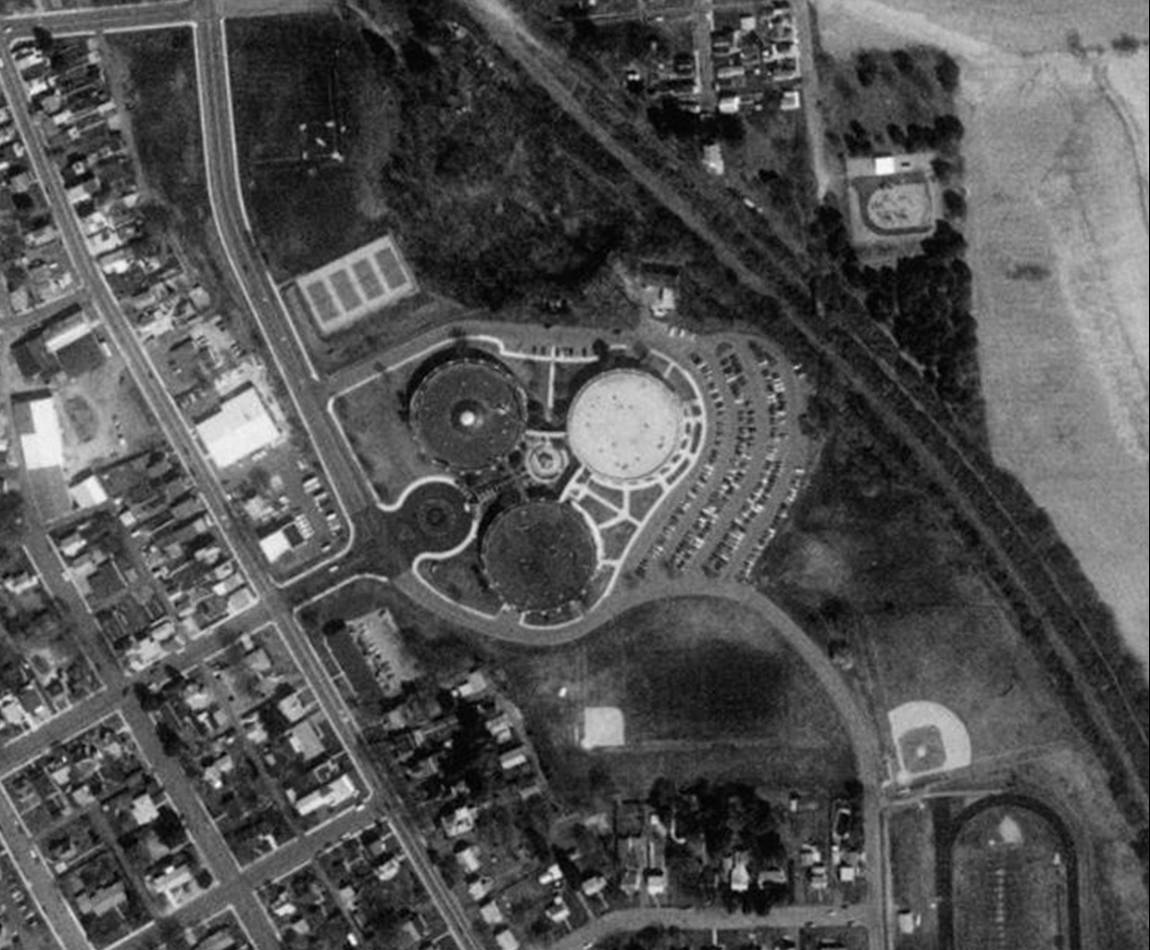
- USGS Aerial Image

Location
- 1000 S. 8th Street; Lebanon, Lebanon County, PA 17042; United States

Information
- School type: Public, Secondary
- Motto: Live. Learn. Lebanon.
- Established: 1852 (current building - 1969, renovated - 2013)
- School district: Lebanon School District
- Superintendent: Nicole Malinoski
- Principal: Robert Nordall
- Staff: 81.17 (FTE)
- Student to teacher ratio: 17.61
- Colors: Red and Blue
- Mascot: Cedar
- Feeder schools: Lebanon Middle School
- Website: high-school.lebanonsd.org
- Lebanon Cedars athletic logo

Lebanon Senior High School (LHS) houses grades nine through twelve for the Lebanon School District, and is located in Lebanon, Pennsylvania. The current building, which also serves as district headquarters, opened to students for the 1969–70 school year. The school, with a unique architecture featuring three circular buildings, underwent extensive renovations completed in early 2013. The school's mascot is the cedar tree. In 2013, the cedar tree mascot, Rooty, was featured in a mini-series on Hulu entitled Behind the Mask. In 2024, the mascot was redesigned and given a new name, Shredder.

== Campus ==
Each of the school's three buildings includes a principal occupant (Library, Gymnasium, or Auditorium) which is used to identify the specific building. The "Library" building contains most of the school's classrooms and the library itself features a glass dome ceiling. In addition to the gym, the "Gymnasium" building includes the school's cafeteria as well as a few classrooms. The "Auditorium" building includes the auditorium and the science and music rooms. Since the renovations, the offices of the high school are located in the West in-fill and the district offices are found in the North in-fill. The renovations also resulted in the enclosure of the school's courtyard into a large atrium.

== Notable alumni ==
- Walter L. J. Bayler - Brigadier General in the United States Marine Corps, known as the "Last Man Off Wake Island."
- Skip Stahley - college football head coach (Class of 1926)
- Sam Bowie - NBA center (Class of 1979)
- Kerry Collins - NFL quarterback (transferred out as sophomore (1987), Class of 1990)
- Dick Shiner - NFL quarterback (Class of 1960)
- Jared Odrick - NFL defensive end (Class of 2006)
- Bobby Gerhart - NASCAR/ARCA race car driver (Class of 1976)
- Thomas Albert - Composer (Class of 1967)
- Jaynne Bittner - All-American Girls Professional Baseball League pitcher (Class of 1944)
