= Linda Stein (artist) =

American feminist artist

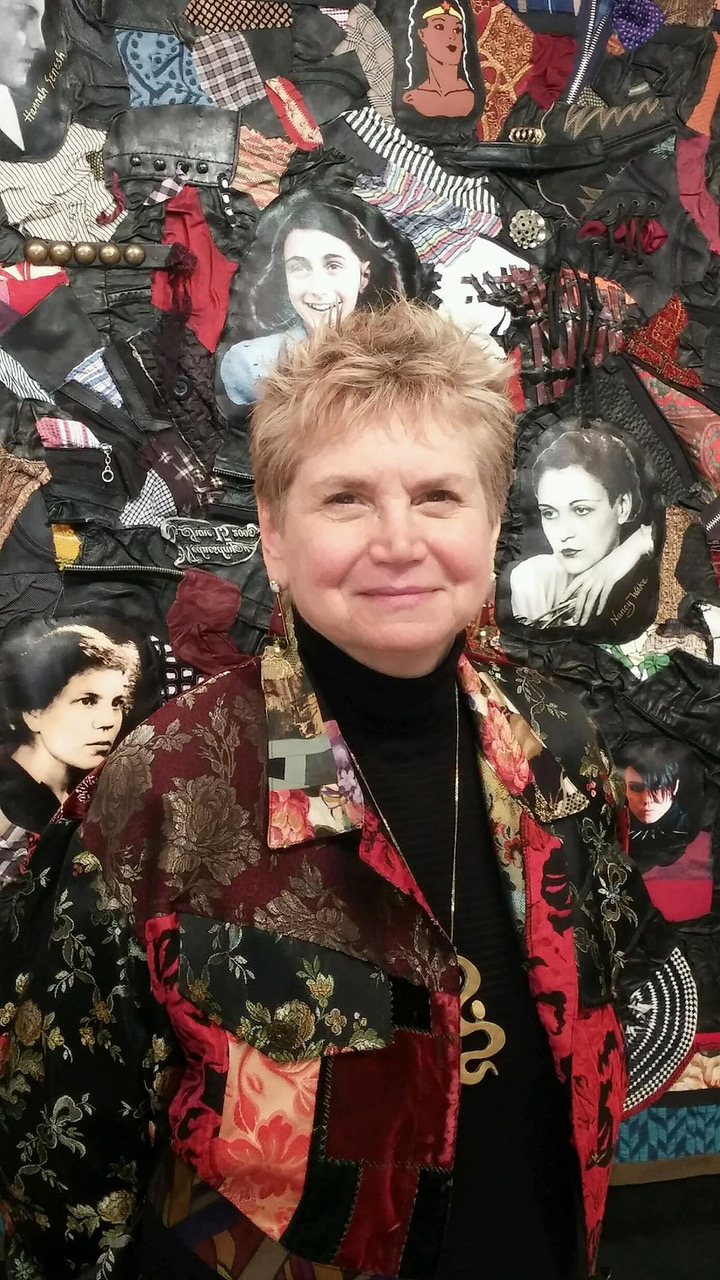
- Portrait of Stein Tapestry
- Born: September 13, 1943 (age 81); The Bronx, New York U.S.
- Education: Queens College; Pratt Institute
- Known for: Sculpture
- Notable work: The Fluidity of Gender & Holocaust Heroes: Fierce Females
- Movement: Contemporary, feminist art
- Website: lindastein.com

Linda Stein (born September 13, 1943) is an American feminist artist whose work focuses on themes of protection and otherness. Her work is primarily abstract and figurative sculpture. She also has a history of nonfiction writing and art education.

Stein is a 9/11 survivor, who was displaced from her Tribeca home and studio following the attacks. This event had a notable impact on her art, inspiring her to move from abstract to figurative work and to address themes of protection, bravery, and sanctuary.

Stein is an active feminist who is on the Board of Directors for Veteran Feminists of America.

Stein came to international attention when British comedian Sacha Baron Cohen fooled her into an interview with his character Borat telling her he was a journalist for Belarus Television making a documentary about the United States, which was included in his 2006 film Borat: Cultural Learnings of America for Make Benefit Glorious Nation of Kazakhstan. In the interview, Stein responded seriously and angrily to Cohen's character's ludicrously sexist attitudes toward women. She finally stormed off the interview set and kicked him out of her studio.

== Early life and education ==
Stein was born in the Bronx to a working-class, Jewish family. She attended the School of Visual Arts and Queens College, where she earned a B.A.. While working as an art teacher she earned an M.A. at the Pratt Institute. She also attended the art students league and Pratt Graphics Center.

Her career began with a calligraphy service that became the premier vendor in New York, used by Tiffany's and Cartier. The business was one of the pioneers in the art gentrification of TriBeCa. Calligraphic Knight 548 is a figurative form providing an example of her calligraphy work from various wedding invitations she had made for Tiffany's. Reference image right: Calligraphic Knight 548

== Artistic career ==
Stein's professional artistic career began in the 1960s, with her studies at Queens College (1961-1965).

Stein works in series, including:

=== Sexism and Masculinities/Femininities: Exploring, Exploding, Expanding (Gender) Expression Series ===
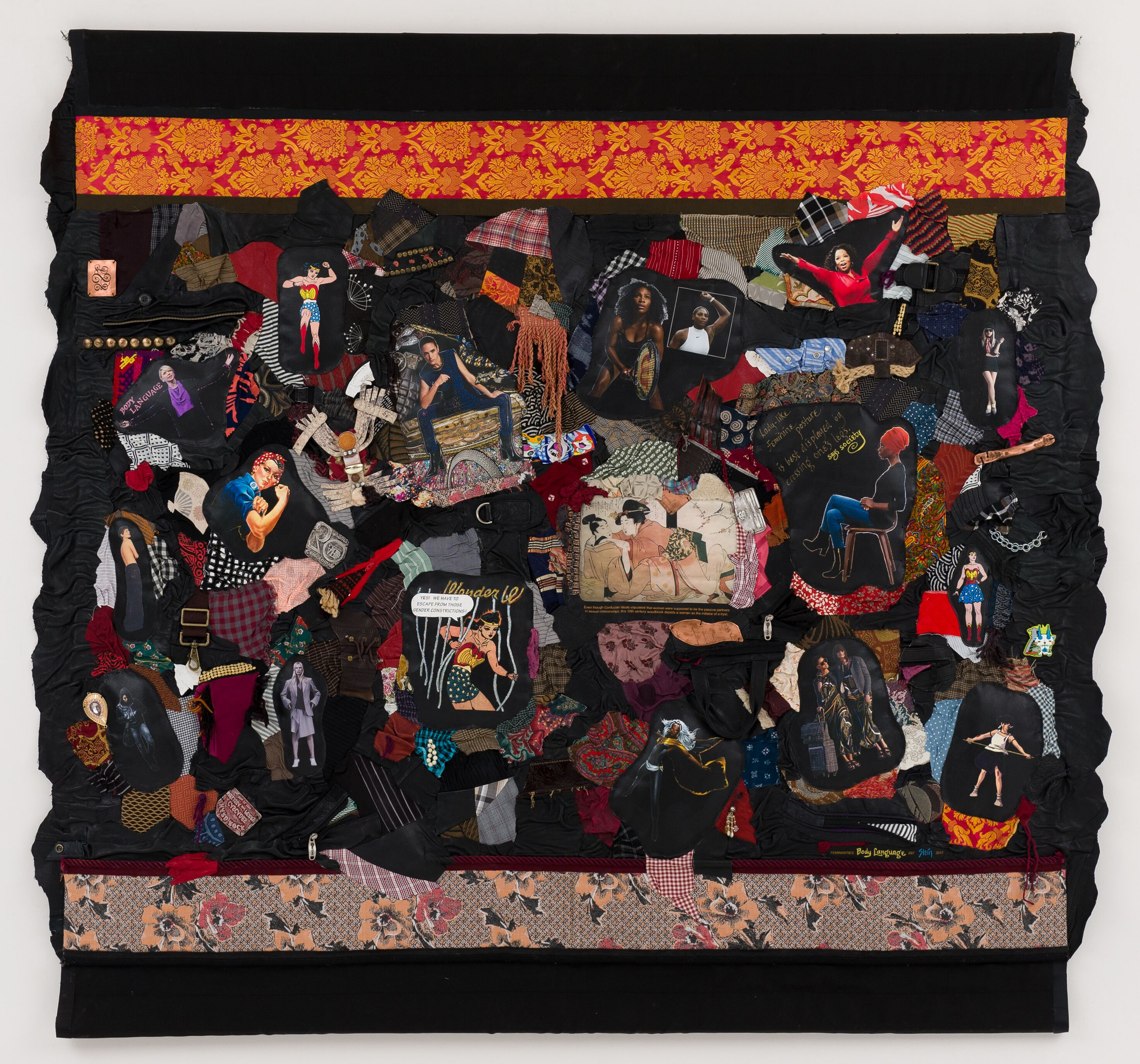
Femininities Body Language 897 (2017)

In 2015, Stein's work began to focus on Sexism in society and the art world. Her work discusses the representation and financial support given to men and the lack of support for women artists. This work references the #MeToo movement, and her non-profit is in the process of collecting stories from women sexually abused in the art world. Reference image right: Femininities Body Language 897

=== Displacement from Home - What to Leave, What to Take: Cabinets, Cupboards, Cases, and Closets Series ===
This series contains assemblage sculptures consisting of different furniture (cupboards, cases, etc.) with random house-hold items. Inspired by the displacement of people from war-torn countries, as well as her own experience on 9/11, Stein creates assemblages which bring to mind the interiors of homes abandoned by individuals forced to flee for safety. Reference image right: Cases 886,855,872,873,874

=== Holocaust Heroes: Fierce Females Series ===
Holocaust Heroes: Fierce Females is one of Stein's major traveling exhibitions which began going to museums and universities in 2015. This body of work contains ten tapestries inspired by historical accounts of women who actively intervened to save Jews from Nazi persecution. Heroes featured include Anne Frank, Noor Inayat Khan, Ruth Gruber, Nancy Wake, Nadezhda Popova, Hannah Senesh, Hadassah Bimko Rosensaft, Zivia Lubetkin, Vitka Kempner, and Gertrud Luckner. First exhibited at the Flomenhaft Gallery in Chelsea in December 2014, the tapestries continue to tour the United States and international venues. This body of work also contains her Spoon to Shell series, which consists of 20 assemblage sculptures which contemplate the sacrifice and bravery of Holocaust victims who were sexually abused. The exhibition also includes wall-hanging "protector" sculptures. Reference image right: Ten Heroes 859

=== The Fluidity of Gender Series ===
Stein made larger-than-life wall sculptures as well as free-standing torsos with "skins" of black leather and mixed media that were intentionally androgynous. This series has been touring museums and universities since 2010 under the title The Fluidity of Gender. Reference image right: Defender 696

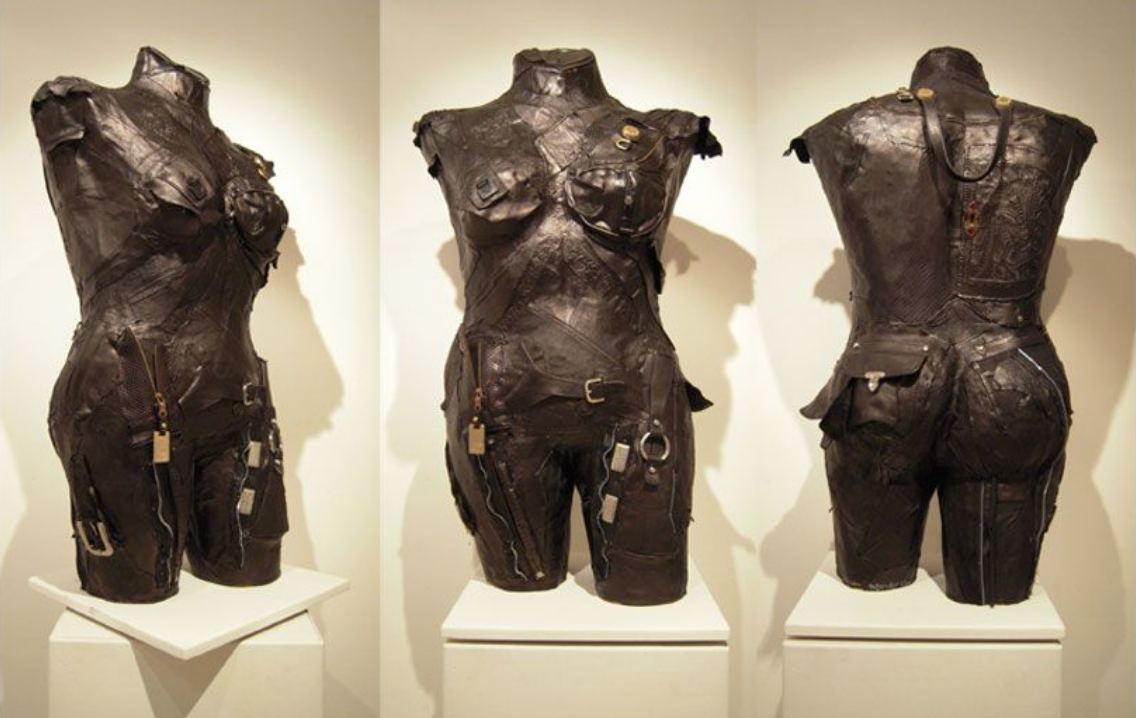
Defender 696 (2010)

=== I Am the Environment Series ===
In 2012, Stein began a series titled I Am the Environment: My Gender, My Nature, including larger-than-life torsos and wall sculptures created from natural materials: beans, shells, branches, seeds, and stones. They suggest the embeddedness of the body in ecological systems and Oceanic feeling. Reference image right: Shell Homes 723

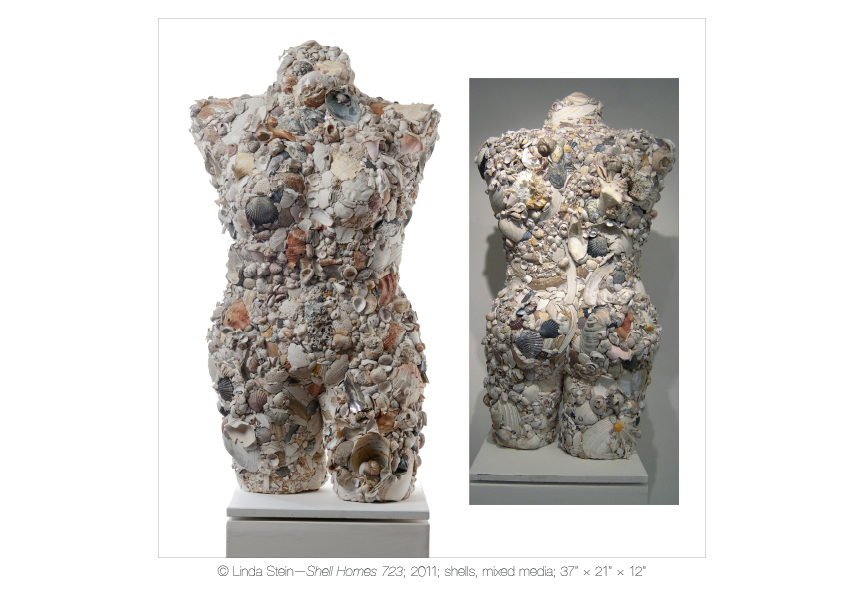
Shell Homes 723 (2011)

=== Body Swapping Armor: Wearable Sculpture Series ===
In 2009, Stein attached shoulder straps to her figurative sculpture, allowing the work to be worn like armor. She invited visitors to her studio to experience "body-swapping": donning the "sculptural avatars" and imagining what it would feel like to be in a differently gendered body. Reference image right: Knight at Ease 652

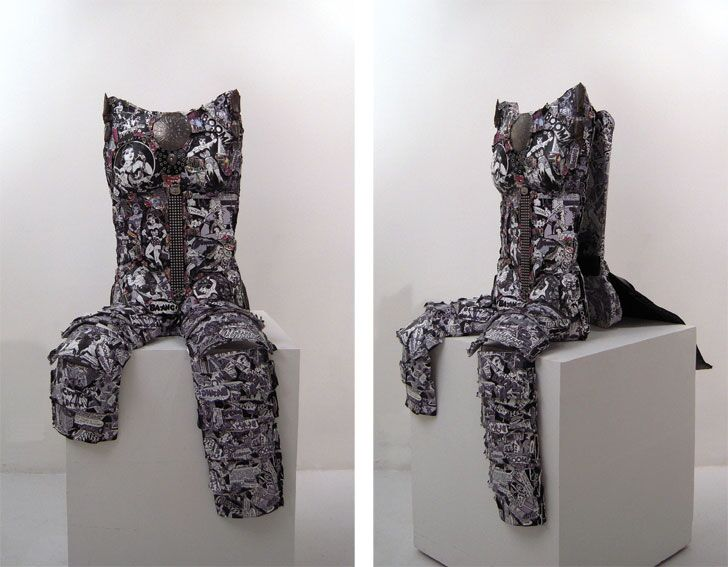
Knight at Ease 652 (2009)

=== Knights of Protection Series ===
Post 9/11, Stein was unable to return to her Tribeca studio or make sculpture for a year. When she returned to making art, her new sculptures were figurative and symbolized protection. Begun in 2002, The Knights of Protection series was her earliest shield-like forms made of mixed media and hung on the wall. Later Knights became more figurative and included images of Wonder Woman, Princess Mononoke, Lady Gaga, Lisbeth Salander, Storm, and Guanyin. Reference image right: Knight of Tomorrow 582

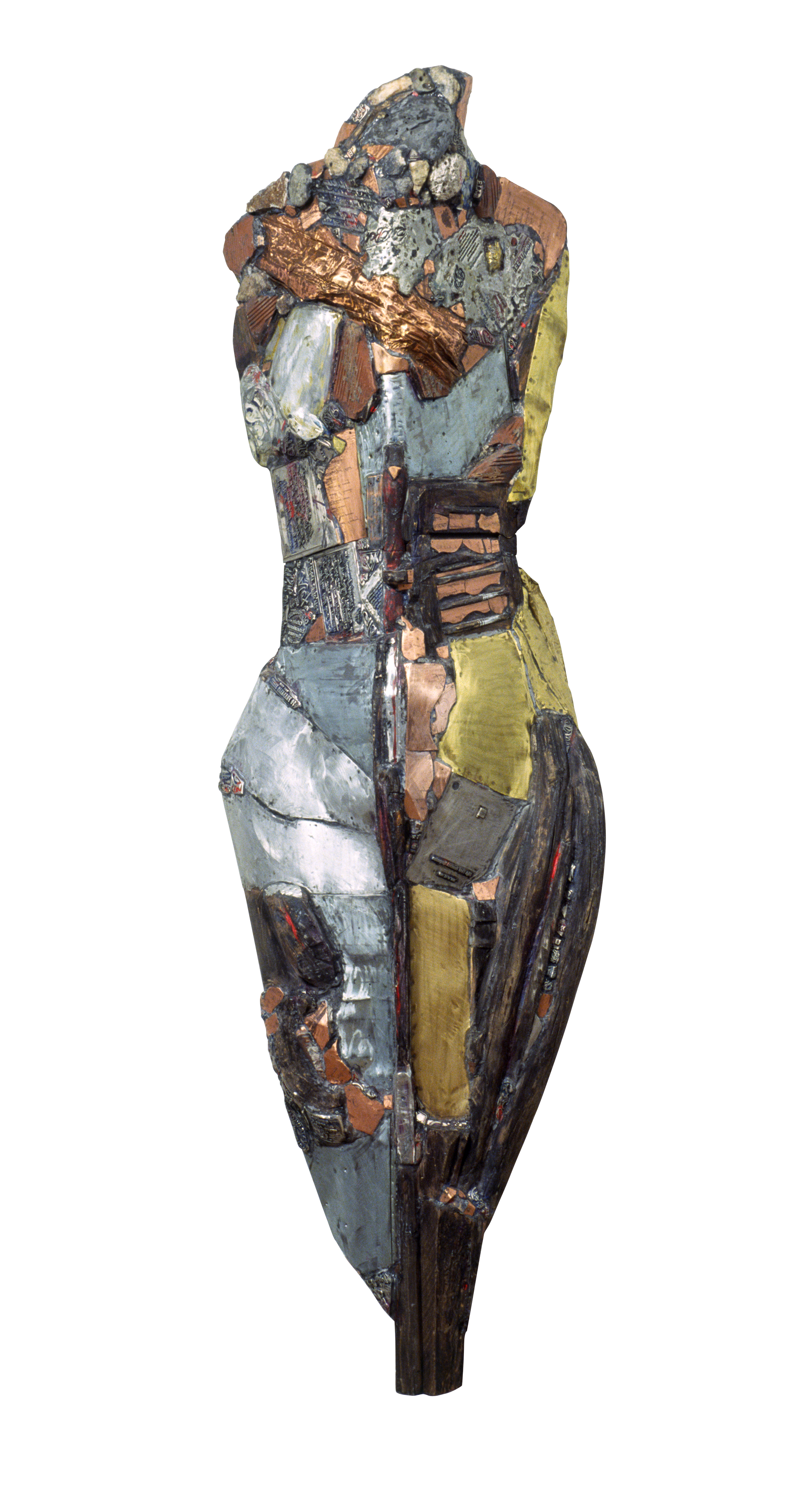
Knight of Tomorrow 582 (2005)

=== Blades & Ceremonial Scepters Series ===
In the 1990s, Stein began the sculpture series, Blades. Stein fused machetes to other materials. The Ceremonial Scepters were objects that looked like ancient weapons and spoke of relationships of power and violence. Stein composed origin stories that undid these associations and offered alternatives, such as defense and empowerment for the user. Reference image right: Slow Motion 192

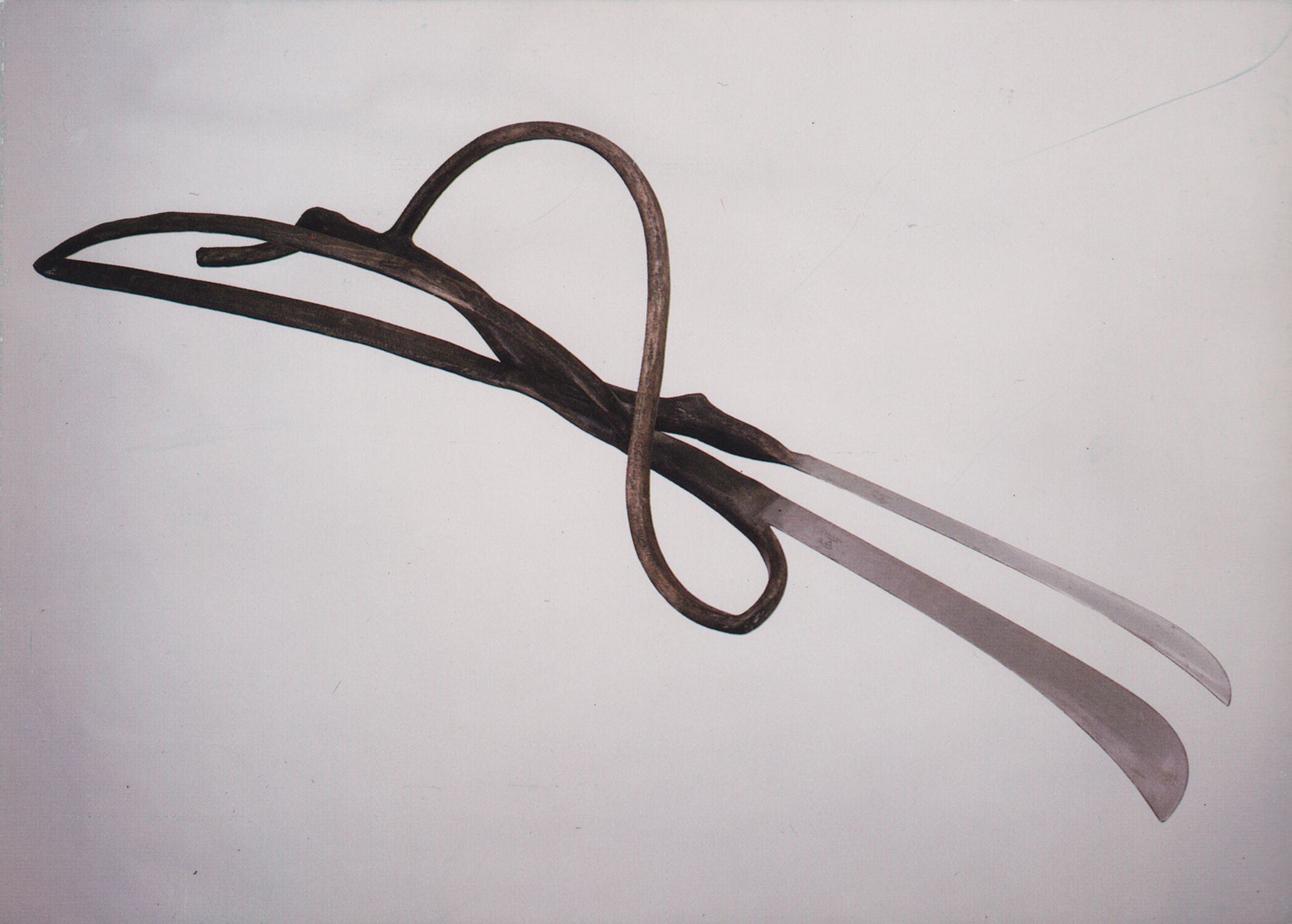
Slow Motion 192

=== Profiles Series ===
In the 1970's Stein became passionate about creating an androgynous facial profile below the eye. During this time she was struggling with her own sexuality and womanhood, which led her to create various mediums within this series. Reference image right: Profile Palette 426

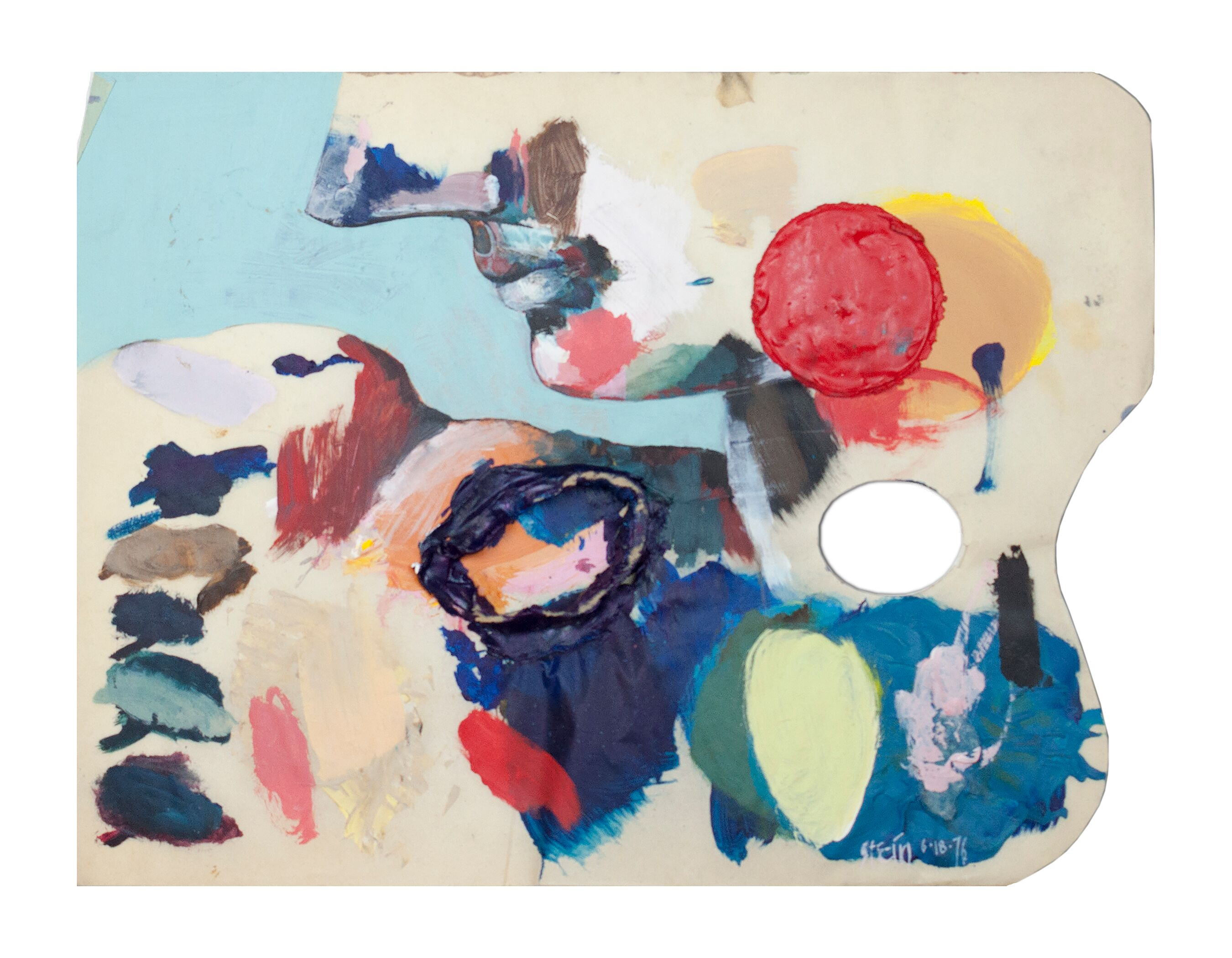
Profile Palette 426 (1975)

== Awards, Grants, and Residencies ==
- 2018 – Women's eNews. Stein chosen as one of "21 Leaders for the 21st Century."
- 2017 – New York City Art Teachers Association (NYCATA)/United Federation of Teachers (UFT). Stein chosen as the 2017 Artist of the Year.
- 2016 – National Association of Women Artists (NAWA). Stein chosen as the 2016 Artist Honoree for Commitment to Arts and Culture; Artist-In-Residence: Squire Foundation, Santa Barbara, California
- 2015 – Financial Grant: Memorial Foundation for Jewish Culture (MFJC)
- 2007 – Artist-In-Residence: Hunter College, Manhattan, New York (2007-2008)
- 2005 – Financial Grant: Lower Manhattan Cultural Council (LMCC) and the New York City Department of Cultural Affairs (DCA)
- 1999 – Guild Hall Museum Award
- 1989 – Resident Fellowship, Virginia Center for the Creative Arts
- 1988 – Resident Fellowship, Djerassi Foundation, California
- 1987 – Resident Fellowship, Virginia Center for the Creative Arts
- 1975 – Financial Grant: America the Beautiful Fund of New York
- 1972-79 – Yearly Artist-in-Residence Grants: Suffolk BOCES Art & Humanities Program, Deer Park School District, New York

== Have Art: Will Travel! Inc. ==
Stein founded Have Art: Will Travel! (HAWT), a non-profit arts organization that promotes positive gender roles towards social justice in 1972. The organization manages the traveling exhibition of The Fluidity of Gender: Sculpture by Linda Stein (FoG), Holocaust Heroes: Fierce Females-Tapestries and Sculpture by Linda Stein (H2F2), and Displacement From Home: What To Leave, What To Take – Cabinets, Cupboards, Cases and Closets by Linda Stein. Programming includes lectures, performances, panel discussions, and educational exercises. HAWT's Curriculum Team has created participatory, social justice art education encounters, which use the traveling exhibitions to start to conversations about visualizing justice.
