= Yolanda Bako =

American feminist and activist (born 1946)

- Born: 1946 (age 79–80)
- Occupation: Activist against domestic violence
- Known for: Co-founded New York City's first state-funded shelter for battered women (1977)

Yolanda Bako (born 1946) is an American feminist and activist against domestic violence.

== Early life ==
Yolanda Bako was born in the Bronx; both of her parents were born in Hungary. Her father was a bouncer at a bar. She graduated from Evander Childs High School. "When I think of the universe, the Bronx is at its center," she commented about her origins, in 1978.

== Career ==
Bako worked as secretary and at the Guggenheim Museum as a young woman. She became coordinator of the Center for the Elimination of Violence in the Family, and in 1977 co-founded Women's Survival Space in Brooklyn, the city's first state-funded shelter for battered women. She was a rape prevention educator at Albert Einstein College of Medicine, and a founding member of the Mayor's Task Force on Rape. She was active in the New York City chapter of the National Organization for Women, and with the National Coalition Against Domestic Violence. She coordinated the 1976 Women's Walk Against Rape in Central Park, telling the New York Times, "We have the right to use the world at night."

In 1978, she testified at Congressional hearings on domestic violence and sexual assault. She was the author of How to start a county-wide task force on family violence (1980), a booklet for the American Friends Service Committee. In the 1980s she worked at the Bronx State Psychiatric Hospital as a mental health therapy aide, and in 1995 she attended the Fourth World Conference on Women in Beijing. In 2017, Bako spoke at "a reunion of second-wave feminists" held by the Veteran Feminists of America in New York.

== Personal life ==
Over six feet tall, Bako was a striking presence in feminist activism in the 1970s New York. Her papers are in the Schlesinger Library at Harvard.
