= Legal Momentum =

United States nonprofit advocacy group

- Formation: 1970 (founded as the NOW)
- Founder: Muriel Fox
- Type: Non-profit
- Headquarters: New York City, New York, United States

Legal Momentum, founded in 1970, is a 501(c)(3) nonprofit and the nation's first and longest-serving legal advocacy group for women in the United States. Betty Friedan and Muriel Fox were its co-founders and Muriel Fox is an ongoing leader of the organization. Carol Baldwin Moody became President and CEO in April 2018. The organization, founded as the NOW Legal Defense and Education Fund, became Legal Momentum in 2004. Legal Momentum is a multi-issue organization dedicated to advancing women’s rights and gender equality, particularly in the areas of equal education opportunities; fairness in the courts; ending all forms of gender-based violence; workplace equality and economic empowerment. The organization employs three main strategies: impact litigation, policy advocacy, and educational initiatives. It is headquartered in New York City.

== Major initiatives and involvement ==
- Wins Sprogis v. United Air Lines, Inc. (marital status discrimination and sex discrimination), 1970.
- Establishes the Judicial Appointment Project and the National Judicial Education Program to increase the number of female federal judges and eliminate gender bias in the courts, 1978-88. The National Judicial Education Program continues to develop training materials and provide training for judges, prosecutors, and multidisciplinary audiences nationwide in order to improve the handling of sexual assault cases.
- Beginning in 1991, worked with the Senate Judiciary Committee to craft and pass the Violence Against Women Act, 1994, and its 2000, 2005, 2011, and 2013 reauthorizations. Legal Momentum continues to craft and pass reauthorizations working with the National Task Force to End Sexual and Domestic Violence
- Wins Tallon v. Liberty Hose Co. No. 1, (women as firefighters and gender-bias), 1984.
- Robinson v. Jacksonville Shipyards (workplace pornography constitutes sexual harassment), 1991 and 1995.
- Crafts the Violence Against Women Act, 1994, and its 2000, 2005, 2011, and 2013 reauthorizations.
- Authors and works to enact the Freedom of Access to Clinic Entrances Act, 1994.
- Amicus curiae in United States v. Virginia involving the Virginia Military Institute's denial of admission to women, 1996.
- Founded Women's eNews in 1999 as an online news service highlighting women's issues.
- Argued United States v. Morrison (concerning the private right of action under the original Violence Against Women Act, including before the U.S. Supreme Court, 2000.
- Supported the Child and Dependent Care tax credit, 2001.
- Apessos v. Memorial Press Group, (employer's discrimination against abuse victim by denying leave from work to obtain protection orders is unlawful), 2002.
- Amicus curiae in Nevada Department of Human Resources v. Hibbs, 2003.
- Argued United States v. The City of New York (interpreting the Civil Rights Act of 1964 as applied to welfare recipients), 2004.
- The National Judicial Education Program (NJEP) posted an extensive online course on an almost invisible issue with critical implications for risk assessment, Intimate Partner Sexual Abuse: Adjudicating This Hidden Dimension of Domestic Violence Cases. Focused on judges but useful for multidisciplinary audiences, the online course is free and open to all, http://www.njep-ipsacourse.org, 2008.
- Amicus curiae in U.S. v. Castleman (gun ownership by convicted domestic abusers), 2014; Supreme Court's opinion cited information from the amicus brief by National Network to End Domestic Violence, Legal Momentum, et al.
- Amicus curiae in Young v. United Parcel Service (workplace accommodations for pregnant workers), 2014.
- Legal Momentum published in 2017 the Legal Toolkit for Women's Economic Equality, a comprehensive New York State guide that educates woman and advocates about rights and benefits in 13 cross-cutting areas that relate to women’s economic security.
- Instrumental in passing legislation in 17 states outlawing sexual extortion

== Impact Litigation ==
Legal Momentum pursues precedent-setting litigation to define and defend women’s rights. It brings cases of national significance to the field of women's rights and contributes amicus ("friend of the court") briefs in cases dealing with issues central to its mission in four main categories: Fairness in the Courts, Violence Against Women and Girls, Workplace Equality and Economic Empowerment, and Equal Education Opportunities. Notable cases include United Steelworkers v. Weber, amicus in Grove City College v. Bell, NOW v. Terry, Robinson v. Jacksonville Shipyards, Inc., Saenz v. Roe, Faragher v. Boca Raton, Wedow and Kline v. City of Kansas City, and Florida Abolitionist and Jane Doe v. Backpage.com et al..

The Syms Legal Momentum Gender Equality Helpline is a free, national resource that provides information, assistance, and referrals for anyone facing gender discrimination. Each year, Legal Momentum fields hundreds of inquiries directing people to the appropriate resources and next steps for their individual circumstance and provides legal representation in a small number of potentially high-impact cases.

== Legislation and Advocacy ==
Legal Momentum leads advocacy efforts on a range of policy solutions aimed at responding to and eradicating gender discrimination and achieving gender equality.

Beginning in 1991, Legal Momentum worked closely with then-Senator Biden to draft and pass the Violence Against Women Act (VAWA), focused on domestic violence, sexual assault, dating violence and stalking. Since 1994, VAWA has provided billions of dollars for victim services, education for justice system professionals and prevention programs aimed at ending gender-based violence.

To pass VAWA, Legal Momentum helped to organize the National Task Force on the Violence Against Women Act, which has evolved into the National Task Force to End Sexual and Domestic Violence (NTF). Legal Momentum's involvement with NTF continues to focus on strengthening VAWA through subsequent reauthorizations.

Legal Momentum also authored the 1994 Freedom of Access to Clinic Entrances (FACE) Act, which protects those seeking reproductive health services from physical violence and intimidation at the clinic door.

Beginning in 2017, Legal Momentum—observing a rapidly growing form of gender-based violence and a gap in laws across the country to address it—led advocacy leading to laws in 16 states and D.C. to close loopholes that allowed for technology-facilitated sextortion offenders to escape accountability.

A statement by 16 women's rights organizations including Legal Momentum, the National Women's Law Center, the National Women's Political Caucus, Girls, Inc., End Rape on Campus, Equal Rights Advocates, the American Association of University Women, and the Women's Sports Foundation said that, "as organizations that fight every day for equal opportunities for all women and girls, we speak from experience and expertise when we say that nondiscrimination protections for transgender people—including women and girls who are transgender—are not at odds with women’s equality or well-being, but advance them" and that "we support laws and policies that protect transgender people from discrimination, including in participation in sports, and reject the suggestion that cisgender women and girls benefit from the exclusion of women and girls who happen to be transgender."

== Educational Initiatives ==
The National Judicial Education Program (NJEP), founded in 1980, creates, presents and publishes a range of curricula and articles grounded in legal, social, and neuroscience research used to educate the judiciary about gender bias and how it can undermine fairness in our justice system. NJEP’s curricula include Understanding Sexual Violence: the Judicial Response to Stranger and Nonstranger Rape and Sexual Assault, and a web course, Intimate Partner Sexual Abuse: Adjudicating the Hidden Dimension of Domestic Violence Cases, available free at www.njep-ipsacourse.org.

Legal Momentum’s Rights Now! peer education program works with youth, especially young women of color, by developing their knowledge and leadership on issues of gender-based violence and discrimination, and empowering them to carry that knowledge back into their communities to teach others.

Legal Momentum’s Women Valued leads legislative advocacy and know-your-rights educational initiatives focused on safeguarding the rights of groups who have long been underserved by our laws, including women of color, immigrant women, victims of gender-based violence, and the disproportionate number of women relegated to low-wage work.

== Name and brand identity ==
In 2004, the NOW Legal Defense and Education Fund rebranded to Legal Momentum, a more succinct, mission-centric name that reflects the evolution and ongoing work of the organization.

== See also ==
- Civil rights
- Constitutional law
- Employment law
- Equal Pay Act
- Gender discrimination
