= Mary Jean Crenshaw Tully =

American women's rights activist (1925–2003)

Mary Jean Crenshaw Tully (1925–2003) was an American women's rights activist. She co-founded the Westchester chapter of the National Organization for Women (NOW) and was the president of the national organization's Legal Defense and Education Fund from 1971 to 1977. She also served as president of the Fund for Women's Rights and co-founded the New York National Women's Political Caucus and the National Committee for Responsive Philanthropy. She directed the Midlife Institute at Marymount Manhattan College from 1981 to 1986. She also funded the Tully Crenshaw Feminist Oral History Project, which documented the experiences of women involved in the early years of NOW.

== Early life and education ==
Mary Jean Crenshaw was born on December 15, 1925, at Fort Sill in Oklahoma to Maude Gresham and Benjamin Mills Crenshaw IV. She was a descendent of Meriwether Lewis. Her father was in the US Army and she grew up as an Army brat. During her childhood, her family moved from Moscow, Idaho, to Fort Davis in Panama, before moving to Sioux City, Iowa, Fort Lewis in Washington, and then to San Francisco, where she attended Lowell High School.

Tully began her college education at Stanford University before transferring to the University of Texas at Austin, and then the University of Chicago. She earned her master's degree from Wayne State University in Detroit. She was a member of the Nu Phi Sigma sorority.

== Activism and women's rights organizations ==
In the late 1940s, Tully was involved with the NAACP in Schenectady, New York. Later, while living in Kansas in 1952, she was on the state board of the League of Women Voters.

Tully co-founded the National Organization for Women (NOW) chapter in Westchester, New York in 1964. For several years during the 1960s she worked at Long Island University as a lecturer in sociology.

From 1971 to 1977 she was the president of NOW's Legal Defense and Education Fund. When Tully was first appointed to the position, the fund had no staff, no office, and little financial assistance from the parent organization. By the time she finished her tenure as president, the fund had around 12 staff members, an operating budget of $650,000, and offices in Washington D.C. and New York. Tully also served as an editor of NOW's newsletter. During the mid-1970s recession, Tully convened an Economic Think Tank for NOW in 1974 with Betty Friedan. Friedan later said of Tully, "Mary Jean was the first person to think big enough about fund-raising for the movement."

Tully served as president of the Fund for Women's Rights from 1971 to 1981. During the 1970s, she assisted in the creation of the advertising campaign for NOW with the slogan "Hire Him. He's Got Great Legs." When the touring exhibition of Judy Chicago's feminist art installation The Dinner Party was having difficulty securing funding in 1978, Tully arranged for a meeting between organizer Diane Gelon and representatives from the Ford Foundation.

She was one of the founders of the National Committee for Responsive Philanthropy in 1976. She served as co-chair for the organization and was a co-founder of the National Women's Political Caucus for New York. She founded Midlife Institute at Marymount Manhattan College and served as its director from 1981 to 1986.

Tully started the Betty Friedan Project and the History of NOW, which spurred reunions of early members of the National Organization for Women and led to the formation of Veteran Feminists of America (VFA) in 1992 during a meeting at her apartment in Manhattan. Tully served as an adviser and board member for the VFA. In the late 1980s, she funded the Tully Crenshaw Feminist Oral History Project which conducted interviews with women who were active in the women's rights movement. The oral history project was continued in 1990 with Tully's $100,000 donation to the Schlesinger Library at Harvard University's Radcliffe Institute.

Tully died of a heart attack on December 27, 2003, at White Plains Hospital in White Plains, New York.

== Personal life ==
Tully married Charles Robert Tully in 1947. She had five children and divorced in 1991. Towards the end of her life she lived in Armonk, New York.
