= Lebanon School District =

School district in Pennsylvania

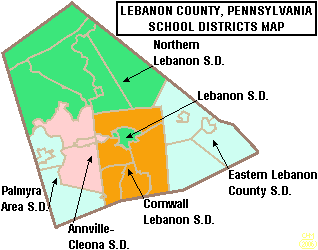

Location
- Lebanon, Pennsylvania; Lebanon County United States
- Motto: Live. Learn. Lebanon.

Students and staff
- District mascot: Cedars

Other information
- Website: www.lebanon.k12.pa.us

Lebanon School District is an urban public school district in Lebanon, Lebanon County, Pennsylvania. One of the oldest school districts in the Commonwealth of Pennsylvania, it encompasses approximately five square miles (1300 hectares). The district includes the City of Lebanon as well as West Lebanon Township.

According to 2020 local census data, it serves a resident population of 26,819.

== History ==
Established during the early to mid-1800s, the Lebanon School District began its school year at roughly the beginning of October, during the 1850s. The treasurer of the school district in 1852 was Henry Dehuff, Officers of the school board in 1854 included Jacob Umberger, president, and Andrew Light, secretary.

In May 1853, the Pennsylvania General Assembly passed legislation authorizing "the School Directors of the Borough of Lebanon, to borrow money; and to occupy the building used by the Female Seminary in the said Borough for Common School purposes." This legislation also empowered members of the district's school board "to borrow any sum of money not exceeding the sum of Five Thousand Dollars, at a rate of interest not exceeding six percent, per annum, for the purpose of building, enlarging and repairing the School Houses in said district."

== Schools ==
=== Primary schools ===
- Harding Elementary
- Henry Houck Elementary
- Northwest Elementary
- Southwest Elementary
- Southeast Elementary

=== Intermediate school ===
- Lebanon Middle School
- Willow Street Academy - closed June 2012; former temporary school for 9th grade students during renovations at Lebanon High School
- Beginning with the 2024–25 school year, the middle school will be replaced by the Lebanon Intermediate School (5th & 6th grades) and the Lebanon Junior High School (7th & 8th grades). However, for the 2024-25 and 2025-26 school years, will temporarily house only 6th grade students during renovations to that building.

=== Secondary school ===
- Lebanon High School
