= Lois Herr =

American politician

Lois Kathryn Herr

Democratic nominee for U.S. Representative from Pennsylvania's 16th district
- Election date November 2, 2010
- Opponent: Joe Pitts (R)
- Incumbent: Joe Pitts

Personal details
- Born: December 23, 1941 (age 84) Hershey, Pennsylvania, United States
- Party: Democratic
- Education: Elizabethtown College (BA); University of Pennsylvania (MA); Fordham University (MBA)
- Profession: Marketing and public affairs, author

Lois Kathryn Herr (born December 23, 1941) is a progressive activist living in Pennsylvania. While working at AT&T, she promoted fighting for equal rights for women in the workplace. A Democrat, she ran for U.S. Representative from Pennsylvania's 16th congressional district in 2004, 2006 and 2010. In 2013, she was elected to the Borough Council of Mount Gretna, Pennsylvania, and took office in 2014.

== Early life and education and career ==
Herr was born in Hershey, Pennsylvania. She graduated from Elizabethtown College in Pennsylvania, received a master's degree from the University of Pennsylvania, and an MBA from Fordham University.

Herr's first full-time job, in 1963, was as a seventh grade English teacher in Middletown. The following year she began working at Bell Laboratories. She held various senior management positions with NYNEX, AT&T, New York Telephone and Bell Laboratories through 1990, working in line operations, sales and marketing, government relations, corporate planning and finance. She gradually became aware that women at AT&T did not receive the same benefits as men, and that there were some jobs which were closed to women. Following a 1970 sex discrimination suit by the Equal Employment Opportunity Commission, Herr and other women at AT&T worked within the corporation for equal rights for women. AT&T settled the suit in 1973.

She was a Presidential Interexchange Executive, working under President Gerald Ford in the White House Office of Management and Budget. Herr has been scholar-in-residence at Elizabethtown College, taught in their Business Department and Center for Continuing Education and also served as Director of Marketing and Public Affairs.

== Publications ==
Herr's first book, Women, Power and AT&T: Winning Rights in the Workplace, was published in 2002 by Northeastern University Press. According to WorldCat, it is held in 488 libraries. It was reprinted by URLink in 2020. Her second book, Dear Coach: Letters Home from World War II, was published in 2009, based on over 200 letters sent to her father, Coach Ira Herr, from men and women serving in the war. A third book, Dear Woman of My Dreams, was published by XLIBRIS in 2016.

== Political career ==
Herr previously served as the Executive Director of the Lancaster County Democratic Committee and was both a local and a state committeeperson in the Pennsylvania Democratic Party. She served also as Chair of the Lebanon County Democratic Committee and a member of the National Organization for Women.

=== Political campaigns ===
Herr ran for the US Congressional seat held by Republican Joseph R. Pitts in 2004, 2006 and 2010. She was defeated in each election by the incumbent.

=== Electoral history ===
Pennsylvania's 16th congressional district: Results 2004, 2006, 2010
Year	Democrat	Votes	Pct	Republican	Votes	Pct	Third Party	Votes	Pct
2004	Lois Herr	98,410	34.5%	Joe Pitts	183,620	64.4%	William Hagen	3,269	1.25
2006	Lois Herr	80,915	39.6%	Joe Pitts	115,741	56.6%	John Murphy	7,958	3.9%
2010	Lois Herr	70,994	34.6%	Joe Pitts	134,113	65.4%			

In 2013, Herr was elected to the Mount Gretna Borough Council as a nominee of the Democratic Party. Herr received 57 votes, defeating Republican nominee Angela Shea, who had 32 votes.

In 2018, Herr was the Democratic nominee for state senator in Pennsylvania's 48th legislative district and lost to incumbent Republican Mike Folmer.

Pennsylvania's 48th legislative district: State Senator results
Year	Democrat	Votes	Pct	Republican	Votes	Pct
2018	Lois Herr	35,545	37.1%	Mike Folmer	60,357	62.9%

== Personal life ==
Herr is a native of Hershey, Pennsylvania and currently resides in Mount Gretna.

In 2024, Herr was nominated to the Lebanon County Women's Hall of Fame.

== Works ==
- Lois Kathryn Herr, Women, Power and AT&T: Winning Rights in the Workplace, Northeastern (December 12, 2002), ISBN 978-1-55553-537-7
- Lois Kathryn Herr, Dear Coach: Letters Home from World War II, (August 10, 2009), ISBN 978-0-615-30230-0
