= Virginia Whitehill =

Virginia Bulkley Whitehill (July 9, 1928 – September 15, 2018) was an American civil rights activist and women's rights advocate from Dallas, Texas, best known for her work in support of securing the legal right of women to control their reproduction. Whitehill was present at the U.S. Supreme Court during the Roe v. Wade court case that confirmed the legality of abortion.

== Personal history ==
Her mother, Myrtle Bales Bulkley, marched for women's suffrage as a young woman and remained a vocal supporter of women's rights until her death in 1990. A native of New York, Virginia Whitehill graduated from Mount Holyoke College in 1950 with a bachelor's degree in history. She moved to Dallas in 1960.

== Advocacy for women's right to abortion ==
On January 13, 1970 Whitehill spoke at a meeting of the Women's Alliance of Dallas' First Unitarian Church. At the meeting she argued that recent cases on abortion that had gone before the US Supreme Court suggested that legislative change in the field would be easier to accomplish through the medium of the courts.

In an interview in 2005, Whitehill said "There's nothing more important to a woman than controlling her own fertility. The vote and birth control are the cornerstones of the emancipation of women."

== Links to organizations ==
In 1969, Virginia Whitehill founded the Dallas Committee to Study Abortion. She was also the Texas Citizens for Abortion Education (TCAE) state coordinator in 1974.

As a member of the Dallas Junior League, Whitehill also helped found Family Place, a refuge for women escaping domestic violence. Whitehill noted there was some resistance to the idea, however she argued "...it wasn't about women's rights. It was about fighting crime, and gosh, maybe it would be good to be safe from crime in your own home."

Whitehill was a co-founder of the Dallas Women's Coalition, Women's Issues Network, Dallas Women's Foundation, Women's Southwest Federal Credit Union, Dallas Women's Political Caucus, Veteran Feminist of America (Dallas) and the Women's Equality Action League. She promoted women's issues and was a supporter of The Women's Museum: An Institute for the Future.

== Awards ==
Whitehill was honored with such awards as Profiles in Leadership from Southern Methodist University Women’s Symposium, Planned Parenthood's Champion of Choice Award, the Women's Council of Dallas County Distinguished Service Award and the Women Helping Women Maura Award of the Women's Center of Dallas. She was named a Mount Holyoke College Distinguished Alumna and was awarded the Myrtle Bulkley Award for Outstanding Service from the League of Women Voters of Dallas, and the Texas Women of Courage Award from the Association of Women Journalists.

Whitehill was nominated for the 10th Annual Texas Trailblazer Award.

== Other ==
Whitehill is featured in the feminist history film She's Beautiful When She's Angry.
