= Women's eNews =

American nonprofit online news service

- Website type: Online news site
- Founder: Rita Jensen
- Website: www.womensenews.org
- Commercial: No
- Launched: 1999; 27 years ago

Women's eNews is a nonprofit online news service based in New York City. It was founded by the late Rita Jensen. Lori Sokol became the organization's executive director in July 2016. Women's eNews publishes international news articles specializing in coverage of women's lives.

== History ==
In 1996, the Barbara Lee Family Foundation funded a discussion about women's media, hosted by a spinoff of National Organization for Women: NOW Legal Defense and Education Fund. In 1999, the NOW Legal Defense and Education Fund underwrote Women's eNews, created to be an online news service for all women, and to act as a news wire for commercial media. The NOW Legal Defense fund put journalist Rita Henley Jensen in the position of editor in chief. NOW Legal Defense Fund's president of the time, Kathryn Rodgers said of the launch:

Looking out at the media's coverage of women, we saw a tremendous void in women's voices, in women as opinion shapers, and in the coverage of all the things that women do in society. So we decided to show the media what they were missing. Not to go on a blame campaign, but to do the ground work, actually do the reporting, and go back to these media outlets and say, 'Here's what we're talking about when we say you're not covering women's issues'.

Two years later on January 1, 2002, NOW Legal Defense and Education Fund released Women's eNews to become an independent organization.

Women's eNews joined the Fund for the City for New York's Incubator/Partner Project Program in 2002.

Women's eNews launched its Arabic language site, Arabic Women's eNews, on April 28, 2003, in response to the theme of women's empowerment in the United Nations Development Program's first Arab Human Development Report. Arabic Women's eNews translates English-language content into Arabic and also creates new content in Arabic. The website went defunct in 2014.

In 2008, Women's eNews left the Incubator/Partner Project Program and became an independent organization. Rita Henley Jensen remained editor-in-chief of Women's eNews.

== Founder ==
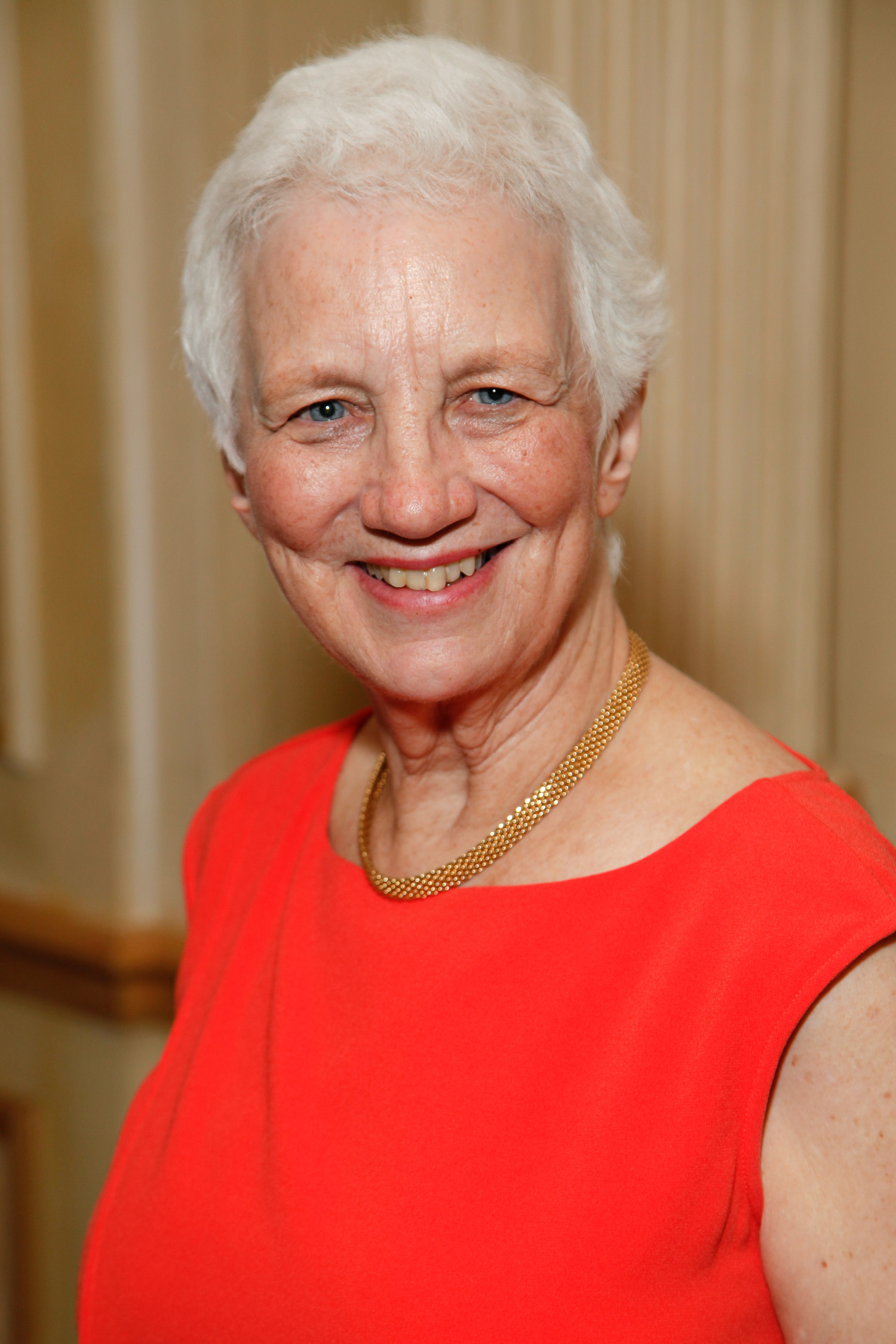
Rita Henley Jensen at Women's eNews' 21 Leaders for the 21st Century in 2012

Rita Henley Jensen (1947–2017) was the founder of Women's eNews.

She left an abusive marriage and attended Ohio State University, graduating in 1976, and Columbia University, graduating in 1977 with a master's degree in journalism.

In 1981, Jensen's then-roommate Kathy Boudin was part of the Brink's robbery. After this Jensen was fired by a newspaper she had been employed by; the paper claimed that she had let lies about what she knew of Boudin's identity be published in it, while Jensen claimed she had actually been fired for not writing a first-person story about being Boudin's roommate, and that accounts in the news had misconstrued her claims about her knowledge of Boudin's identity. Jensen's daughter later stated that she (Jensen) had been blacklisted. However, she was later able to return to work as a journalist.

In 2000, she founded Women's eNews and became its editor-in-chief. In 2016, she became its Editor-In-Chief Emerita.

Jensen was also on the honorary advisory board for the Women's Media Center.

She received the Columbia University Graduate School of Journalism Alumni award, the Hunter College Presidential Grant for Innovative Uses of Technology in Teaching, the Lloyd P. Burns Public Service prize, the PASS Award from the National Council on Crime and Delinquency, and the Rosa Cisneros Award from the International Planned Parenthood Federation, Western Hemisphere Region. The Women Economic Forum named her the 2016 Iconic Thought Leader for the Decade in Media, and she had also been named one of the 100 most influential women in New York by the New York Daily News.

She died of breast cancer in Manhattan, New York, on October 18, 2017, at the age of 70. She was survived by two daughters, two granddaughters and two grandsons.

== Funding ==
Women's eNews receives funding from individual donors on their website, and from humanitarian foundations. Notable grants include one of $100,000 received in 2010 from the Ford Foundation earmarked for the production of a 12-part series on women's poverty in America: "Scenes from the Women's Economy". Beginning in July 2009, a 20-month grant totaling $400,000 came from the W. K. Kellogg Foundation for the study of high mortality rates related to childbirth in African-American communities.

== Awards ==
Women's eNews and its writers have received over 35 awards since the organization's launch in 2000, including "Best Internet Site" in 2005 from the National Federation of Press Women, and the "Exceptional Merit in Media Award" in 2010 from the National Women's Political Caucus.

Jensen won many awards for her work at the helm of the news service including the National Association for Female Executives' Woman of Excellence award in 2010. She was also a past honoree as one of the most Exceptional Women in Publishing, an annual award first given to Gloria Steinem.
