= Women's Strike for Equality =

1970 strike by women in the US

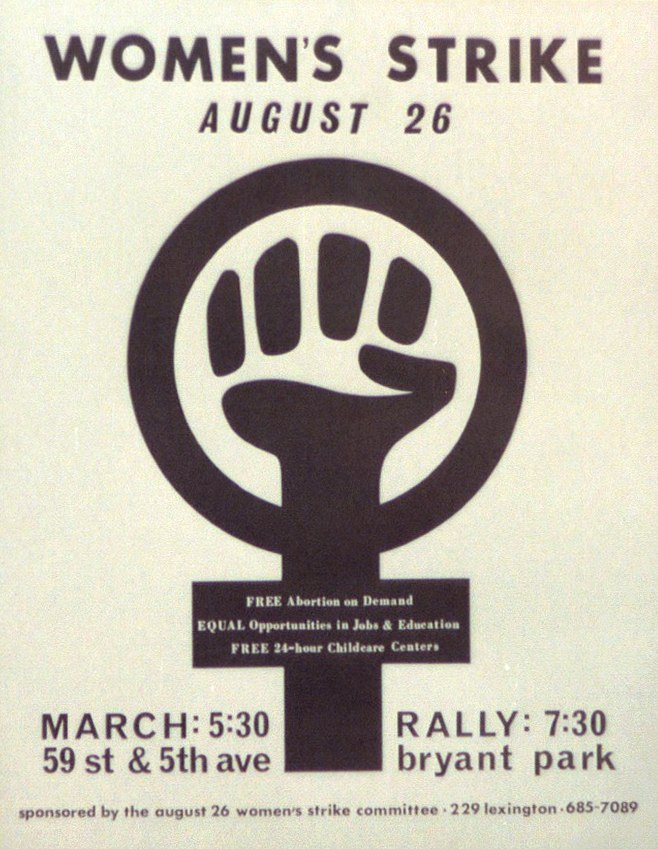

The Women's Strike for Equality took place in the United States on August 26, 1970. It celebrated the 50th anniversary of the passing of the Nineteenth Amendment, which effectively gave American women the right to vote. The rally was sponsored by the National Organization for Women (NOW). Estimates ranged as high as 50,000 women at the protest in New York City and more protested throughout the country. At this time, the gathering was the largest on behalf of women in the United States. The strike, spearheaded by Betty Friedan, self-stated three primary goals: free abortion on demand, equal opportunity in the workforce, and free childcare. The strike also advocated for other second wave feminist goals more generally, such as political rights for women, and social equality in relationships such as marriage.

== Historical context ==
At the time of the protest, women still did not enjoy many of the same freedoms and rights as men. Despite the passage of the Equal Pay Act of 1963, which prohibited pay discrimination between two people who performed the same job, women comparatively earned 59 cents for every dollar a man made for similar work. Women were also restricted in terms of their access to higher education. For example, Harvard University did not admit women until 1977. And regardless of education, women were generally channeled into one of four occupational choices: secretarial, nursing, teaching, or motherhood. Sandra Day O'Connor, the first female Associate Justice of the US Supreme Court, who graduated at the top of her class from Stanford Law School, was offered only secretarial jobs in Los Angeles law firms despite her prestigious degree. In 43 states, women were limited in the number of hours they could work and the amount of weight they could carry (generally no more than 25 pounds (11 kg), the size of a toddler, as some feminists noted). In many states, women were also unable to obtain credit cards, make wills, or own property without a husband. The right to serve on a jury was denied to women in some states.!

== Organization ==
Feminist Betty Jameson Armistead sent a letter to Betty Friedan and others proposing the strike. Betty Friedan, writer of The Feminine Mystique, and a leader of second-wave feminism, then planned the protest to commemorate the anniversary of landmark legislation, and spotlight current battles. She said the movement was in need of "something big, something so big it will make national headlines". Friedan initially proposed the strike to the National Organization for Women, an organization which she had helped found. Members were hesitant, however, fearful that the protest would not be successful, and could create a mockery of their movement.

Friedan continued to develop a strategy, months in advance, despite the negative reception. The initial planning meeting was small and chaotic; planners sat in a circle and discussed possible strategies without a real leader or any formal organization. The meeting produced nothing tangible or relevant. As the plans progressed, so did the controversy. In the final month leading up to the event, the group was significantly divided into two factions: the young "radical, crazies" and the "bourgeoisie" founders.

Eventually, Friedan prevailed, avoiding deep divisions by recruiting women and men, liberals and conservatives alike. Friedan sought permission from the city of New York to close Fifth Avenue for the protest. The city refused.

== The strike ==
Despite the setback, women gathered on the streets at around 5 pm (chosen so that working women could attend) and began protesting. The New York action included chanting and speeches by prominent figures (including Friedan), as well as signs and posters. Crowd estimates put somewhere between ten and twenty thousand people, mostly women, gathered on Fifth Avenue. Police attempted to keep the crowd restricted to one lane of traffic, but the sheer volume of people was impossible to control and they spread across the street from sidewalk to sidewalk.

Thousands of politically and satirically charged signs dotted the crowd. "Don't iron while the strike is hot" set the stage as the protest's famous slogan. Others included: "Hardhats for Soft Broads", "I Am Not a Barbie Doll", "Storks Fly – Why Can't Mothers", "We are the 51% minority", and the sardonic "We have the right to vote for the man of our choice". Speeches were given to ignite the crowd and inform bystanders. Friedan spoke of the strength and ability of women to rise above their oppression. The strike's goals were to publicize the feminist movement and ideas and to expose the injustices experienced by women.

In conjunction with the New York City action, individuals and groups throughout the nation staged protests, marches, and other various forms of revolt to honor the movement. One example occurred in Boston, where around 5,000 women gathered in Boston Common and 1,000 went on to march into downtown Boston. A noon rally also drew around 2,000 people in San Francisco's Union Square. About 125 women marched on City Hall in Syracuse, N. Y., and in Manhasset, L. I., women gathered signatures on a petition urging Senate passage of the Equal Rights Amendment.

In Detroit, women staged a sit-in in a men's restroom protesting unequal facilities for men and women staffers. In Pittsburgh, four women threw eggs at a radio host who dared them to show their liberation. One thousand women in Washington, D.C. staged a march down Connecticut Avenue behind a banner reading "We Demand Equality"; in the same city, government workers organized a peaceful protest and staged a "teach-in", which educated people about the injustices done to women, mindful that it was against the law for government workers to strike. "Silent vigils" held in Los Angeles drew meager crowds of only 500. In Minneapolis, women gathered and staged guerrilla theater involving key figures in the national abortion debate, and stereotypical roles of women in American society. Women were portrayed as mothers and wives; doing dishes, rearing children and doting obnoxiously on their husbands, all while wearing heels and aprons. Approximately 100 women participating in the strike also marched down Kiener 5 Memorial Plaza in Saint Louis as well.

Though gaining less media attention than the public demonstrations, another component of the protest was a one-day strike from work. Betty Friedan had asked that "the women who are doing menial chores in the offices as secretaries put the covers on their typewriters, [...] the waitresses stop waiting, cleaning women stop cleaning and everyone who is doing a job for which a man would be paid more stop [working]." Striking from work was intended to highlight unequal pay as well as limited job opportunities for women. In addition to refusing to perform paid labor on this day, women across the country were also asked to refrain from any household chores. By refusing to cook or clean, they were attempting to emphasize the unequal distribution of household work among the sexes. However, because of the nature of striking from unpaid labor, it is unclear how many women participated.

Despite initial obstacles and setbacks, Friedan declared the event a success. Including the protests and demonstrations throughout the country, she proclaimed, "It exceeded my wildest dreams. It's now a political movement and the message is clear".

== Reactions and media coverage ==
The strike received extensive local and national attention, both positive and negative. In opposition, some women called for the "National Celebration of Womanhood", a day dedicated to women dressing in "frilly", feminine clothing, singing while doing the laundry, and cooking breakfast in bed for their husbands. Other women simply watched the protest, unsure of its implications or what exactly the protest was about. One woman in the crowd was quoted as saying, "I don't know what these women are thinking of. I love the idea of looking delectable and having men whistle at me."

Many media outlets questioned the validity of the protest. CBS news quoted a poll that found two-thirds of American women did not feel they were oppressed. News anchor Eric Sevareid compared the feminist movement to an infectious disease and ended his report claiming that the women of the movement were nothing more than "a band of braless bubbleheads".

Many feminists were angry and dismayed by the language used by major media outlets to describe their movement, as many claimed the reporting was biased and condescending, focusing primarily on the rage of the women in the march and not the overall message. ABC continued to fuel the anger when reporter Howard K. Smith publicly spoke against the movement, denying its credibility and claiming a lack of evidence for the cause. The women's movement subsequently engaged in a media backlash, boycotting the four major corporations whose advertising and broadcasting they found to be offensive and degrading. ABC eventually retracted Smith's statement. Smith later clarified that he did not support women's liberation because, in his view, women were already liberated. "Women dominate our elections; they probably own most of the nation's capital wealth; any man who thinks he, and not his wife, runs his family is dreaming," he said.

Not all media attention, however, was negative. President Richard Nixon issued a proclamation acknowledging the credibility of the movement and designated the anniversary of women's suffrage as "Women's Equality Day" at the behest of House Rep. Bella Abzug. Time Magazine also supported the cause and published a series of articles highlighting the issues of the movement.

The significance of the protest was vast for its supporters. Feminists and scholars claimed that the strike was a significant spark for second wave feminism, owing to the protest's high profile in the media and the country.

== See also ==
- List of protest marches on Washington, D.C.
