= Cindy Judd Hill =

American feminist (1926–2019)

- Born: March 5, 1926
- Died: March 2, 2019 (aged 92); South Fayette, Pennsylvania, U.S.
- Education: Westminster College; Duquesne University

Dorothy I. "Cindy" Judd Hill (March 5, 1926 – March 2, 2019) was an American feminist and pageant winner. She was working as a music teacher when she was dismissed for being pregnant while on a sabbatical year and sued her school district, alleging that she had faced employment discrimination. Her case went to the Supreme Court of Pennsylvania and was successful, which began her focus on women's rights activism. She was a founding member of the Greater Pittsburgh Area and the South Hills chapters of the National Organization for Women and was actively involved in the campaign to ratify the Equal Rights Amendment. After retiring in 1984, she began to compete in senior beauty pageants and was crowned Ms. National Senior Citizen in 1993.

== Early life ==
Hill was born on March 5, 1926. She grew up in Duquesne, Pennsylvania. She had two siblings, Myrtle and Raymond "Bud". As a child, she took tap dancing lessons organized through the Works Progress Administration and planned to become a dancer and singer. While in high school, she was nicknamed "Gams" by a classmate. In 1944, she graduated from Duquesne High School and began studying at Westminster College, where she graduated in 1947 with a bachelor's degree in music education. She met John "Jack" Hill when she was fourteen. When he returned from fighting in World War II, the couple married in April 1945. He proposed to her multiple times in letters until she agreed to marry him. The couple moved to Thornburg, Pennsylvania, a suburb of Pittsburgh, where her husband worked as a civil engineer. The couple had four children: John Lancing, Jonathan Jay, A. Judson, and C. Irene. She was a housewife until 1956 when she decided to go to work.

== Discrimination lawsuit ==
Hill began working as a music teacher at Chartiers Valley High School in 1956. She stayed there for the next decade until she took a year's sabbatical in 1966 to study for a master's degree in music education from Duquesne University. While studying, she became pregnant and gave birth to her fourth child, Jay, but the school dismissed her when she tried to return following the sabbatical. The school district required teachers to inform them of a pregnancy within four months and take unpaid maternity leave for a year. They argued that she had asked for the sabbatical – the terms of which allowed her to be paid half of her salary while studying – on false pretenses. She filed a lawsuit against the Chartiers Valley School District, relying on the federal equal employment opportunity legislation outlawing employment discrimination. She was supported in her case, Hill v. Chartiers School District, by the newly formed National Organization for Women (NOW) and the Pennsylvania State Education Association. The case received front-page coverage from the Pittsburgh Post-Gazette and Hill addressed the national conference of NOW, receiving support both locally and nationally. In August 1968, Judge Benjamin Lencher ruled that she should be reinstated. The school district appealed the decision to the Pennsylvania Supreme Court, but in November 1968, the court refused to hear the appeal, and the lower court's decision was left to stand. Hill was awarded backpay of $14,000, although she spent more than $20,000 on the lawsuit.

The landmark case established a precedent for teachers contracts' to specify that they cannot be fired without cause while pregnant and that they are entitled to their same job and pay when returning from maternity leave. Despite her success, the school district assigned her to teach at elementary and middle schools for the rest of her career, rather than at the high school.

== Activism ==
Following the success of her lawsuit, Hill was approached by several women's rights groups and joined NOW in 1967. She had been persuaded by Betty Friedan to attend the first meeting in Washington, D.C., where she told the nascent organization about her lawsuit. She then was recruited by Wilma Scott Heide to become one of the founding members of the Pittsburgh chapter of NOW in November 1967, along with Charlotte Coe, Ruth Heimbuecher, Anita Fine, Dan Fine, Anne Mast, Bob Mast, Daryl Bem, Sandy Bem, Ann Heuer and Virginia Harrington. As the public relations director of the chapter in 1968, she changed the name to the Greater Pittsburgh Area chapter and two years later, she helped create a 12-hour talk show for the local radio show WJAS featuring feminist speakers. She later served as vice president of the chapter. Hill was also an executive board member of Pennsylvania NOW. She helped to found the South Hills chapter of NOW in 1972 and was an active member of the chapter until it closed in 1994, serving as the co-president for three terms, including in 1984 and 1986.

Hill became actively involved in the campaign to pass the Equal Rights Amendment (ERA), traveling the country to debate opponents of the amendment, including Phyllis Schlafly, and attending demonstrations during the 1960s in Washington, D.C. She accompanied Heide and Jean Witter to testify before a sub-committee of the Democratic Congressional Platform Committee to convince them to support the ERA in 1968. She published an article on the ERA in The Christian Science Monitor and was an ERA missionary in 1981 to promote the proposed amendment to Mormons in Salt Lake City, Utah. She took six months of unpaid leave from her job in 1982 to go to Chicago to convince the state legislature of Illinois to ratify the amendment, working as a volunteer at the ERA Countdown office.

Hill was also involved in a number of other causes, participating in marches and writing letters to the editor. In 1969, she was involved in picketing The Pittsburgh Press over its segregation of classified advertisements by sex. She lobbied the National Weather Service to change the names of hurricanes to include men's names in 1972. She marched in a protest in support of abortion rights on January 22, 1990, where she carried a sign reading "My Uterus is Not Government Property". She attended the first national conference of NOW and attended every conference as a delegate until 1991. Through her activism, she met Margaret Mead. Once, to protest the slow pace of renovations to a bridge in her neighborhood, she lay down in the road to block tractors.

== Later life ==
Hill retired from teaching in 1984. She became involved in senior beauty pageants after reading about a contest in the newspaper, using Gams as her stage name. She competed in the Ms. Pennsylvania Senior America pageant in 1990, placing fourth and winning the award for best "philosophy of life and talent". In her second pageant, she was the second runner-up. In March 1993, she won Ms. Pennsylvania Senior America with a song and dance, accompanied by her daughter on piano, and a philosophy of life titled "Women are People". She was crowned as the winner of the Ms. National Senior Citizen pageant held in Joliet, Illinois, in October 1993. Following her success in the pageant, she was featured in a 1998 NOW cookbook.

She joined a performance troupe for performers over 55 years old at Robert Morris University, the RMC Independents, and began performing her own show "A Body of Song" at retirement homes and senior centers. She sang the national anthem on multiple occasions at Three Rivers Stadium and won multiple gold and silver medals at the 1998 World Championship for the Performing Arts. Her husband died in June 1998. She remarried in 2012 to Frank Youngk, who died in 2018. In March 2013, she spoke at a panel discussion at the Heinz History Center titled "Sisterhood in Pittsburgh: Women's Liberation from the 1960s to Today" alongside Molly Rush, Alma Speed Fox, Patricia McCann and Jeanne Clark.

== Death and legacy ==
Hill died on March 2, 2019, at her retirement home in South Fayette, from complications due to dementia. Her oral history appeared in an exhibit titled "In Sisterhood: The Women's Movement in Pittsburgh" at the Pittsburgh Center for the Arts in January 2009.
