= Maggie Savoy =

American newspaper editor (1917–1970)

- Born: Margaret Ann Case; February 14, 1917; Des Moines, Iowa, U.S.
- Died: December 19, 1970 (aged 53); Los Angeles, California, U.S.
- Education: University of Southern California
- Occupation: Journalist
- Years active: 1947–1970
- Spouses: William Savoy (m. 1940; div. 1950) J.W. Pitts III (m. 1951; died 1963) Jim Bellows (m. 1964)

Margaret Ann Savoy Pitts Bellows (née Case; February 14, 1917 – December 19, 1970) was an American newspaper editor. She was the women's editor for the Phoenix Gazette between 1947 and 1959, and then spent five years at The Arizona Republic. She moved to New York City in 1964 following her third marriage, to fellow journalist Jim Bellows, and wrote for the Associated Press, before joining United Press International to write on its urban beat. After moving to Los Angeles in 1967, she became the women's editor for the Los Angeles Times, writing for Section IV until it was renamed as the View in July 1970, where she profiled women including Joan Didion, Maya Angelou and Nancy Reagan.

Savoy worked to expand the focus of the women's page of newspapers, writing about social and environmental issues at a time when this was uncommon. She wrote columns on rape helplines, domestic violence, the death penalty and welfare. In 1963, she worked with Marie Anderson to survey editors nationally on the content of women's pages and the conditions for women's editors, finding that women's editors received less pay and support. She was an outspoken feminist, often profiling leaders of the women's liberation movement, including Elizabeth Duncan Koontz and Aileen Hernandez. Fellow editor Dorothy Roe described Savoy as "one of the two or three ablest women's editors in the country".

== Early life ==
Savoy was born Margaret Ann Case on February 14, 1917, in Des Moines, Iowa. Her father was Andrew Case, her mother was a teacher and encyclopedia salesperson and she had one brother, Robert. Her family were relatively well-off and she attended Fillmore Elementary School in Cedar Rapids before the family moved to Des Moines, Omaha, Nebraska, and Phoenix, Arizona. She often visited her uncle in New York by herself while growing up. She graduated summa cum laude from the University of Southern California with an honors degree in journalism in 1940, where she had been a member of Phi Beta Kappa. The day after graduation, she married her classmate William Savoy. Her first job was in publicity for Metro-Goldwyn-Mayer studios, before working for comedian Red Skelton and then opening a public relations company in Phoenix.

== Career ==
Savoy began working as the women's editor for the Phoenix Gazette in 1947, where she wrote the column 'Around Town'. The newspaper owner, Eugene C. Pulliam, was famously conservative but he respected Savoy's liberal views. She spent ten years at the paper before joining The Arizona Republic in 1959 as the women's editor, which had a daily circulation over 100,000. She was at the Republic until 1964, writing the daily 'Savoy Faire' column. At the time, the women's page of newspapers were focused on society and the home, primarily featuring social events, wedding announcements and fashion, but there was a push to cover the women's liberation movement and other political issues. As the women's editor, Savoy often also served as a fashion reporter, covering local seamstresses and designer fashion shows. However, throughout her career, Savoy wrote about social issues such as racism, sexism and economic inequality. Pulliam, who also owned the Republic, hired J. Edward Murray as the paper's managing editor in 1960 and he shared Savoy's liberal views, providing friendship and support. Murray wrote that she used her column to "stir a social conscience in the movers and shakers", which won her the first award granted by the Arizona Newspaper Association for best women's section.

Savoy pressed for the wedding announcements of African-Americans to be included in the paper at a time when this was rare and wrote stories on rape helplines, domestic violence and pay disparities. She was also interested in environmental issues, working with local leaders to establish the Valley Beautiful Committee in early 1963 after the response to one of her columns, which raised money for subterranean power lines and to protect green spaces, and advocated for Camelback Mountain to remain clear of proposed housing. She also wrote columns about poverty, women's labor issues, health, finance and fashion for career women. In 1959, an interview she conducted with Casey Stengel, manager for the New York Yankees, received national coverage through an Associated Press (AP) wire report after he protested at her taking down his words verbatim. This attention led to her being awarded "Arizona Newspaper Woman of the Year" by the Arizona Federation of Press Women and a Penney-Missouri Award. She also received an award from the National Federation of Press Women and the Catherine L. O'Brien journalism award.

She became involved with national industry organizations, attending the first meeting of women's editors held by the American Press Institute in 1959. Working with the Associated Press Managing Editors (APME) and Marie Anderson, a women's editor at the Miami Herald, she surveyed women's editors and their managing editors in 1963 on the content of women's pages in newspapers, discovering that women's issues received fewer column inches and that women's editors were lower paid and often excluded from meetings. The report was presented to the APME through a talk entitled "What Does Your Women's Editor Think of You?", which included eleven areas for improvement including training and support. Savoy replicated the presentation at the Penney-Missouri awards workshops in March 1963. A follow-up survey six years later, titled "How is it going in the women's departments? Or what has happened since Anderson-Savoy?" showed little progress had been made.

In 1964, she moved to New York City to be with Jim Bellows and began writing for the AP, although issues with her supervisor led to her leaving in November 1965. She began working for United Press International (UPI), focusing on cities; the appointment was announced in a full page article in Editor & Publisher as "the first woman at a wire service to cover an urban beat". Savoy relocated to Los Angeles in 1967, when Bellows was hired by the Los Angeles Times as associate editor for soft news, but continued writing for UPI, travelling around the country for her stories and giving speeches to local societies about urban development. She was quickly approached by the L.A. Times about joining the paper to reform their women's section as the society editor. She wrote memos to the editor-in-chief, Nick Boddie Williams, explaining that she intended the women's section, referred to as Section IV, to cover issues such as abortion, welfare, public housing and capital punishment. Williams had told her husband that he hoped to cover controversial topics and Savoy was hired, although she eventually convinced them to change her title to women's editor. As couples were unable to work together at the paper, a typical rule at the time, Savoy's hiring was seen to be controversial.

While at the L.A. Times, Savoy wrote personal columns, news stories and profiles on women including Marilyn Lewis, Adela Rogers St. Johns, Joan Didion, Clare Boothe Luce, Maya Angelou and Nancy Reagan. Her news stories covered topics such as the death penalty, women on welfare, drug addiction and inner-city schools. At the 1968 Democratic National Convention in Chicago, she was one of the reporters to be tear-gassed by the police. In 1969 and 1970, she wrote about the women's liberation movement in a number of profiles on Elizabeth Duncan Koontz, director of the United States Women's Bureau, Jo Ann Evansgardner, an activist of the National Organization for Women (NOW), and Aileen Hernandez, president of NOW. Savoy was a strong supporter of the women's movement, describing herself as "a bra-wearing, dues paying member of women's liberation". She wrote an article for the Bulletin of the American Society of Newspaper Editors in 1970 where she criticized editors for their coverage of women's liberation and declared that "women are second-class citizens". She was listed as one of the "Reporters You Can Trust" published by the feminist organization KNOW, Inc.

In July 1970, her section of the L.A. Times was renamed as View, which was intended to expand the coverage to features about the LA region. She wrote her final newspaper column on November 29, 1970. Following her death, Jean Sharley Taylor took over as the editor of the section.

== Personal life ==
Savoy was married to her first husband for a decade and the couple had one son together, William, before their divorce in 1950. The following year she married J. W. Pitts III, a vice president of Valley National Bank, until his death in a car accident in May 1963. She had met Bellows, then an editor at the New York Herald Tribune, in January 1961 while covering a fashion show in New York City. The two began an affair shortly before her second husband's death and a few months later, he left his pregnant wife and two children for Savoy. His wife initially refused a divorce but when it was finalized, they married in May 1964 with Jimmy Breslin serving as the best man. The judge who officiated the wedding commented on her surnames, as there were more than would fit on the marriage form.

== Death and legacy ==
Savoy was diagnosed with uterine cancer seven months after her marriage to Bellows, which went into remission following chemotherapy. She was then diagnosed with esophageal cancer on July 28, 1970, and told that she had only months to live. She wrote a draft of a book about her experiences of cancer, composed primarily of her diary entries, which was published as a column with UPI. She died on December 19, 1970, at the UCLA Medical Center in Los Angeles. She left $30,000 to the Salvation Army's Youth and Family Center in South Phoenix, which was increased to $100,000 through a fundraiser by her friends and colleagues. On February 10, 1971, the Arizona Senate passed a unanimous resolution to honor Savoy, sponsored by Cloves Campbell Sr., Howard S. Baldwin, James A. Mack and Bob Stump.

An award in her honor was created by the Los Angeles Women in Communication following her death, given for community service. She was described by fellow editor Dorothy Roe as "one of the two or three ablest women's editors in the country" and by Pulliam as "one of the greatest". Despite this, she is not mentioned in the history of The Arizona Republic or in Privileged Son, Dennis McDougal's history of the L.A. Times. Bellows wrote a book about her in 1971 titled, Anyone Who Enters Here Must Celebrate Maggie, which included her columns and writing, as well as messages from her friends and colleagues. Among those who contributed letters were Luce, Angelou, and Ray Bradbury.
