= Jo Ann Evansgardner =

American psychologist (1925–2010)

- Born: Jo Ann Evans; April 19, 1925; Latrobe, Pennsylvania, U.S.
- Died: February 16, 2010 (aged 84); Pittsburgh, Pennsylvania, U.S.
- Education: University of Pittsburgh
- Occupation: Psychologist
- Political party: Republican
- Spouse: Gerald Gardner (m. 1950; died 2009)
- Relatives: Barbara Fleischauer (niece)

Jo Ann Evansgardner (April 19, 1925 – February 16, 2010) was an American psychologist and social activist. Born in Latrobe, Pennsylvania, she studied psychology at the University of Pittsburgh and met her husband, Gerald Gardner, whom she married the same year she received her bachelor's degree. The couple moved to Dublin, Ireland, but returned to Pittsburgh after five years, where Evansgardner received a doctorate in experimental psychology. She co-founded the Association for Women in Psychology in 1969 and was active alongside her husband in the NAACP and numerous feminist organizations.

In 1968, the couple joined the National Organization for Women (NOW) and served as joint presidents of the First Pittsburgh NOW chapter. In this role, Evansgardner worked to found KNOW, Inc. and was involved in the 1973 Supreme Court case of Pittsburgh Press Co. v. Pittsburgh Commission on Human Relations, which ended the practice of newspapers segregating help-wanted advertisements by gender. She was appointed as eastern regional co‐director for NOW and coordinated the national protests against AT&T.

Evansgardner sued the Westinghouse Broadcasting Company for sex discrimination in 1977, a case that went to the Supreme Court in Gardner v. Westinghouse Broadcasting Co. She was also a co-founder of the National Women's Political Caucus and a failed Republican candidate for the Pittsburgh City Council in 1971. She and her husband moved to Houston, Texas, in 1980, where she founded a local chapter of NOW at the University of Houston. They returned to Pittsburgh, where she died on February 16, 2010.

== Early life ==
Evansgardner was born Jo Ann Evans on April 19, 1925, in Latrobe, Pennsylvania. Her parents were Eugene and Elizabeth Evans, and her niece was Barbara Evans Fleischauer, a future state representative in West Virginia. She grew up in the neighborhood of Hazelwood in Pittsburgh, Pennsylvania. As a child, she wanted to become a physician but was dissuaded from the male-dominated profession. She left Pittsburgh during World War II to move to North Carolina, where she drove trucks for the Second Army. In 1945, she moved back to her hometown and worked on research for Union Carbide & Co. at the Mellon Institute of Industrial Research, a job that allowed her to study at the University of Pittsburgh. She graduated in 1950 with a bachelor's degree in psychology. The same year, she married Gerald Gardner, who worked as a mathematician and geophysicist. She initially hyphenated her surname with her husband's but, due to issues with computers not allowing hyphenated names, instead chose to combine their names. Shortly after they married, the couple spent five years in Dublin, Ireland, where Evansgardner resisted her role as a housewife.

== Academic career ==
Evansgardner received a doctorate in experimental psychology from the University of Pittsburgh in 1965, where she was supervised in her dissertation on physiological psychology, titled The induction of mating behavior in very young white rock cockerels, by Alan E. Fisher. She taught at Carnegie Mellon University from 1964 to 1966, as well as lecturing at several other universities. She faced gender discrimination while in academia, writing an unpublished 1971 essay on her experiences. She was often critical of the psychology profession. She was frustrated that women were diagnosed with mental disorders if they expressed anger or depression about receiving unfair treatment as the result of their gender. She also criticized the practice of using only male mice in experiments, a concern which was later validated by studies that showed medical research on male subjects was often less applicable to female patients.

During her time in the profession, few women were involved in academic conferences. There were only twelve women who served as symposium chairs or gave addresses at the 1965 annual meeting of the American Psychological Association (APA), out of a total of 1700 speakers. Four years later, Evansgardner was one of nineteen featured women at the annual meeting, when she challenged the status quo by presentating a paper titled "What can the behavioral sciences do to modify the world so that women who want to participate meaningfully are not regarded as and are not in fact deviant?". In 1969, Evansgardner founded the Association for Women in Psychology (AWPA) with thirty-five other psychologists and served as the first interim president. The nascent organization petitioned the APA to establish a Task Force on the Status of Women in Psychology and as a result, the following annual conference featured eleven seminars on the topic of women's psychology. Evansgardner received a distinguished publication award for contributions in editing and publishing from the AWPA in 1977. She was also a co-founder, alongside Ina Braden, of the Pittsburgh University Committee for Women's Rights.

== Social activism ==
Evansgardner was active in the civil rights movement, joining the National Association for the Advancement of Colored People (NAACP) with her husband in 1963. The couple were also active throughout the seventies and eighties with the American Civil Liberties Union (ACLU), the International Women's Year in 1975, the National Women's Conference in 1977, and reproductive rights groups. They joined the National Organization for Women (NOW) in 1968. She was recruited to the group by Wilma Scott Heide, her colleague at the psychology department of Pennsylvania State University, and became well known for recruiting other women to the movement. She was credited with convincing Eleanor Smeal, who would later become president of NOW and the Feminist Majority Foundation, to join the women's movement.

=== KNOW, Inc. ===
In 1968, Evansgardner founded KNOW, Inc. with her husband, Heide, Jean Witter, and Phyllis Wetherby. The press was the first feminist publishing house, which operated out of Evansgardner's house in Shadyside. It operated under the slogan, "Freedom of the press belongs to those who own the press". They printed speeches and articles from feminists and other NOW members, including "The Tyranny of Structurelessness" by Jo Freeman and I'm Running Away from Home, But I'm Not Allowed to Cross the Street by Gabrielle Burton. Sheila Tobias, who had organized one of the first women's rights conferences in the country, became involved with KNOW and agreed to allow the publishing house to print the materials that she had gathered from professors at a variety of universities who taught about women's issues. Through this partnership, KNOW printed the first women's studies course materials. The following year, Evansgardner proposed that the term Ms. should be used instead of Mrs. or Miss.

=== First Pittsburgh NOW ===
Evansgardner served, alongside her husband, as the co-president of their local chapter of NOW, First Pittsburgh NOW. Through her role in the organization, she was involved in picketing alongside the Young Women's Christian Association (YWCA), Women in the Urban Crisis, and the NAACP outside the Sears in the neighborhood of East Liberty to protest the managers not hiring enough African Americans or using Black mannequins. When the police only arrested Black protesters, Evansgardner and Gardner called out to be arrested as well. The protest worked and Sears agreed to a thirty percent increase in African American employees. She was also heavily involved with the campaign to pass the Equal Rights Amendment (ERA) in Pennsylvania. Evansgardner and Gardner hosted weekly letter-writing parties in their home to write legislators on their and their friends' behalf between 1969 and 1978.

In 1969, she was elected to the national board of NOW. In the same year, she and her husband worked with First Pittsburgh NOW to file a complaint with the Pittsburgh Commission on Human Rights against The Pittsburgh Press, alleging that the newspaper's sex-segregated classified advertisements were unlawful sex discrimination. The newspaper would separate help wanted ads into separate columns depending on whether the employer was looking for a male or female employee. Her husband assisted the case by calculating the statistical chance that a woman would be hired for a job targeted at men. The Commission upheld the complaint filed by First Pittsburgh NOW and the newspaper lodged a court case, arguing that this decision infringed on its right to freedom of the press under the First Amendment. The Supreme Court heard the case in its 1973 decision in the case Pittsburgh Press Co. v. Pittsburgh Commission on Human Relations and ruled by a 5–4 margin that segregating job advertising was discriminatory. The newspaper was forced to take out any references to sex from its classifieds, a ruling which also applied to the Pittsburgh Post-Gazette.

Evansgardner served as eastern regional co‐director for NOW and contested the role of legal vice‐president, although she was not appointed to the latter position. In this role, she helped to coordinate the national protests against AT&T. She coordinated demonstrations across fifteen cities in New York, Massachusetts, Minnesota, Florida, Washington, Pennsylvania, Illinois, Alabama, Ohio, Missouri, New Mexico, Texas, and California. The NOW chapters protested the company's discrimination against women in the areas of hiring, appointments, promotions, and benefits. She was also involved in the landmark lawsuit against the company which began in November 1970 led by the Equal Employment Opportunity Commission alleging racial and sexual discrimination. She helped organize the 1974 Wonder Woman Conference in Atlantic City, New Jersey, which she described as a "counter pageant" to contrast the Miss America pageant which was being held at the same venue concurrently. She worked with Heide, Patricia Hill Burnett, and Rona Fields on an international conference that was held on June 1, 1973, bringing together more than 300 women from 27 countries.

Evansgardner was known for being confrontational. She shoved a security guard at West Pennsylvania Hospital while attending a protest against the hospital banning abortions after the twelfth week of pregnancy. In 1970, she interrupted two United States Senate hearings to demand a focus on women's issues. On February 17, 1970, she was among a group of Pittsburgh NOW chapter members who disrupted a hearing on lowering the voting age to eighteen, holding up signs and demanding that the Senate act on the Equal Rights Amendment (ERA). She also interrupted a hearing on the nomination of G. Harrold Carswell to the United States Supreme Court and was instructed by Senator Edward Kennedy to sit down. In 1972, she was arrested alongside her husband for assisting in the effort to place a paper-mâché of Susan B. Anthony on the head of a statue of Father Duffy in Times Square. A couple of years later, in 1974, she tried to hit a county official who told her to "get back to the kitchen where you belong." Evansgardner and Jeanne Clark went to Washington, D.C. in 1975 to protest in favor of reproductive rights at the Vatican embassy, where a man was arrested for spitting at her after she kicked him.

=== Gardner v. Westinghouse Broadcasting Co. ===
In 1977, Evansgardner sued the Westinghouse Broadcasting Company in a civil rights class action lawsuit, alleging sex discrimination in the radio station's hiring practices after KDKA in Pittsburgh failed to hire her as a talk show host. She was acting on behalf of herself and all other women under Title VII of the Civil Rights Act of 1964. She applied for class action status under Rule 23(b)(2) of the Federal Rules of Civil Procedure, but the District Court for the Western District of Pennsylvania and the Court of Appeals for the Third Circuit both rejected her application. Evansgardner appealed and her case went to the Supreme Court in Gardner v. Westinghouse Broadcasting Co. 46 U.S.L.W. 4761 (1978), which ruled in a 9–0 decision that an order denying certification of a class by a federal judge cannot be appealed. Justice John Paul Stevens wrote in the decision that allowing appeals would harm the final judgment rule. The court compared the situation to a motion for summary judgment, which cannot be appealed under section 1292(a)(1).

=== Other activism ===
Evansgardner was a founder of the Professional Women's Caucus in 1968, and she was credited by Eleanor Smeal with instituting the creation of women's caucuses in professional organizations. She helped to found the National Women's Political Caucus (NWPC), which was created on July 12, 1971, to increase the percentage of women in political office to fifty percent. She was also involved with the debate to include girls in Little League Baseball, which ended in 1974 with the league agreeing to allow girls to participate. She also organized funding and access to birth control, rape crisis centers, and women's shelters.

In 1971, she ran for a position on the Pittsburgh City Council as a candidate for the Republican Party, although she was unsuccessful. She ran under the slogans "Don't Call Me Lady", "JoAnn Evans, NOW" and "put this woman in her place". She ran on a platform of amending building codes to allow for prefabricated houses and sharing the city tax burden with people who commuted into Pittsburgh from the suburbs. Evansgardner was invited to participate in several talk shows and candidate forums, where she used the opportunity to discuss feminist issues and distribute brochures on the ERA. During her campaign, the chancellor at the University of Pittsburgh refused to set up childcare facilities despite NOW requests and Evansgardner organized an unofficial daycare in the lobby of the Cathedral of Learning to protest the inadequacy of these facilities. She was a co-chair of Shirley Chisholm's presidential campaign in Pittsburgh, alongside Alma Speed Fox.

She was the only woman on the Allegheny County Study Commission and in 1973 and 1974, she drafted a home rule charter for the county, although it did not pass in the referendum. She did manage to convince the commission to back the position that there could not be a majority of members of any sex on an appointed board. She also contested the 1979 election to the Pittsburgh school board, running as a Republican in the 4th district. She received 421 votes and lost to Democrat Solomon Abrams.

She and Gardner moved to Houston, Texas, from Pittsburgh in 1980. She founded a new chapter of NOW at the University of Houston while her husband, who taught engineering at the university, served as the faculty adviser. While at the university, Evansgardner studied journalism and worked as a reporter for the student newspaper, The Daily Cougar. She presented a paper at the National Women's Studies Association annual meeting in June 1985, where she argued that the word 'feminism' should be replaced with 'isocracism', implying equality of power. Her suggestion was not adopted.

== Later life ==
Later in her life, Evansgardner became involved in environmental activism. After retiring, she and Gardner moved back to Hazelwood, where they built a geothermal house. The couple blocked the mayor of Pittsburgh from building a coke plant in their neighborhood, which would have been heavily polluting. She was honored in an exhibit titled "In Sisterhood: The Women's Movement in Pittsburgh" at the Pittsburgh Center for the Arts in January 2009. At the end of her life, Evansgardner had diabetes, heart disease, and Alzheimer's disease. Her husband died on July 25, 2009, and she died seven months later on February 16, 2010, at Forbes Hospice in Pittsburgh.
