= Epicenter =

Point on the Earth's surface that is directly above the hypocenter in an earthquake

The epicenter is directly above the earthquake's hypocenter (also called the focus).

The epicenter (/ˈɛpɪˌsɛntər/), epicentre, or epicentrum in seismology is the point on the Earth's surface directly above a hypocenter or focus, the point where an earthquake or an underground explosion originates.

== Determination ==
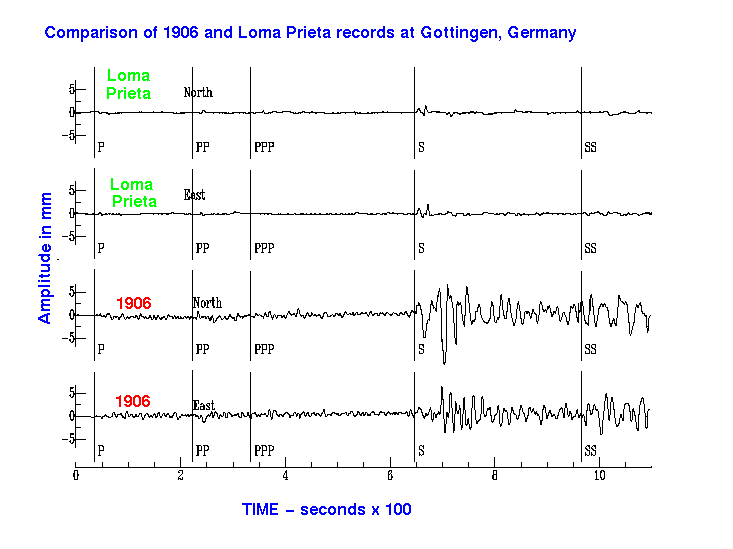
Modern and historic seismograms

The primary purpose of a seismometer is to locate the initiating points of earthquake epicenters. The secondary purpose, of determining the 'size' or magnitude must be calculated after the precise location is known.

The earliest seismographs were designed to give a sense of the direction of the first motions from an earthquake. The Chinese frog seismograph would have dropped its ball in the general compass direction of the earthquake, assuming a strong positive pulse. We now know that first motions can be in almost any direction depending on the type of initiating rupture (focal mechanism).

The first refinement that allowed a more precise determination of the location was the use of a time scale. Instead of merely noting, or recording, the absolute motions of a pendulum, the displacements were plotted on a moving graph, driven by a clock mechanism. This was the first seismogram, which allowed precise timing of the first ground motion, and an accurate plot of subsequent motions.

From the first seismograms, as seen in the figure, it was noticed that the trace was divided into two major portions. The first seismic wave to arrive was the P wave, followed closely by the S wave. Knowing the relative 'velocities of propagation', it was a simple matter to calculate the distance of the earthquake.

One seismograph would give the distance, but that could be plotted as a circle, with an infinite number of possibilities. Two seismographs would give two intersecting circles, with two possible locations. Only with a third seismograph would there be a precise location.

Modern earthquake location still requires a minimum of three seismometers. Most likely, there are many, forming a seismic array. The emphasis is on precision since much can be learned about the fault mechanics and seismic hazard, if the locations can be determined to be within a kilometer or two, for small earthquakes. For this, computer programs use an iterative process, involving a 'guess and correction' algorithm. As well, a very good model of the local crustal velocity structure is required: seismic velocities vary with the local geology. For P waves, the relation between velocity and bulk density of the medium has been quantified in Gardner's relation.

== Surface damage ==
Before the instrumental period of earthquake observation, the epicenter was thought to be the location where the greatest damage occurred, and it remains a common misconception that the strongest shaking is always at the epicenter. In large earthquakes, the greatest damage is often not centered at the epicenter but is instead spread across the fault rupture zone. The direction of the rupture, a phenomenon called directivity, can also cause the area of greatest shaking to be located away from the epicenter. As an example, in the magnitude 7.9 Denali earthquake of 2002 in Alaska, the epicenter was at the western end of the rupture, but the greatest damage was about 330 km (210 mi) away at the eastern end. Focal depths of earthquakes occurring in continental crust mostly range from 2 to 20 kilometers (1.2 to 12.4 mi). Continental earthquakes below 20 km (12 mi) are rare whereas in subduction zone earthquakes can originate at depths deeper than 600 km (370 mi).

== Epicentral distance ==
During an earthquake, seismic waves propagates in all directions from the hypocenter. Seismic shadowing occurs on the opposite side of the Earth from the earthquake epicenter because the planet's liquid outer core refracts the longitudinal or compressional (P waves) while it absorbs the transverse or shear waves (S waves). Outside the seismic shadow zone, both types of wave can be detected, but because of their different velocities and paths through the Earth, they arrive at different times. By measuring the time difference on any seismograph and the distance on a travel-time graph on which the P wave and S wave have the same separation, geologists can calculate the distance to the quake's epicenter. This distance is called the epicentral distance, commonly measured in ° (degrees) and denoted as Δ (delta) in seismology. The Láska's empirical rule provides an approximation of epicentral distance in the range of 2,000−10,000 km.

Once distances from the epicenter have been calculated from at least three seismographic measuring stations, the point can be located, using trilateration.

Epicentral distance is also used in calculating seismic magnitudes as developed by Richter and Gutenberg.

== Fault rupture ==
The point at which fault slipping begins is referred to as the focus of the earthquake. The fault rupture begins at the focus and then expands along the fault surface. The rupture stops where the stresses become insufficient to continue breaking the fault (because the rocks are stronger) or where the rupture enters ductile material. The magnitude of an earthquake is related to the total area of its fault rupture. Most earthquakes are small, with rupture dimensions less than the depth of the focus so the rupture doesn't break the surface, but in high magnitude, destructive earthquakes, surface breaks are common. Fault ruptures in large earthquakes can extend for more than 100 km (62 mi). When a fault ruptures unilaterally (with the epicenter at or near the end of the fault break) the waves are stronger in one direction along the fault.

== Macroseismic epicenter ==
The macroseismic epicenter is the best estimate of the location of the epicenter derived without instrumental data. This may be estimated using intensity data, information about foreshocks and aftershocks, knowledge of local fault systems or extrapolations from data regarding similar earthquakes. For historical earthquakes that have not been instrumentally recorded, only a macroseismic epicenter can be given.

== Etymology ==
The word is derived from the Neo-Latin noun epicentrum, the latinisation of the ancient Greek adjective ἐπίκεντρος (epikentros), "occupying a cardinal point, situated on a centre", from ἐπί (epi) "on, upon, at" and κέντρον (kentron) "centre". The term was coined by Irish seismologist Robert Mallet.

It is also used to mean "center of activity", as in "Travel is restricted in the Chinese province thought to be the epicentre of the SARS outbreak." Garner's Modern American Usage gives several examples of use in which "epicenter" is used to mean "center". Garner also refers to a William Safire article in which Safire quotes a geophysicist as attributing the use of the term to "spurious erudition on the part of writers combined with scientific illiteracy on the part of copy editors". Garner has speculated that these misuses may just be "metaphorical descriptions of focal points of unstable and potentially destructive environments."
