= Gerald Gardner (disambiguation) =

Gerald Gardner (1884–1964) was an English Wiccan and author.

Gerald Gardner may also refer to:

- Gerald Gardner (mathematician) (1926–2009), American mathematician
- Gerald Gardner (writer) (1929–2020), American scriptwriter and author
