= Wilma Scott Heide =

American feminist leader (1921–1985)

- Wilma Scott Heide, 1973
- Born: Wilma Louise Scott; February 26, 1921; Ferndale, Pennsylvania, US
- Died: May 8, 1985 (aged 64); Norristown, Pennsylvania, US
- Education: University of Pittsburgh; Union of Experimenting Colleges and Universities
- Spouse: Eugene Heide (m. 1951; div. 1972)
- Relatives: Ray Eugene Scott (brother); Harold Dwight Scott (brother); Tamara Lee Heide (daughter)

Wilma Louise Scott Heide (February 26, 1921 – May 8, 1985) was an American author, nurse, and social activist. Born in Ferndale, Pennsylvania, Heide trained as a registered nurse in psychiatry at Brooklyn State Hospital. She began her career at a mental hospital in Torrance, Pennsylvania, where she imposed changes to rectify the persistent mistreatment of staff and patients. She received her bachelor's and master's degrees in sociology from the University of Pittsburgh and was involved in a number of activist groups in the city.

She became more heavily involved in the feminist movement in 1967, when she joined the National Organization for Women (NOW) and became a founding member of the Pittsburgh chapter. Heide was involved in The Pittsburgh Press case that ended the practice of listing separate help wanted ads for men and women, decided in 1973 by the Supreme Court of the United States in Pittsburgh Press Co. v. Pittsburgh Commission on Human Relations. She also led a demonstration during a United States Senate subcommittee meeting that was credited with restarting hearings on the Equal Rights Amendment (ERA).

Heide was the third president of NOW from 1971 to 1974, during which time she grew the organization to over 50,000 members, led a campaign against AT&T for sex discrimination, and convinced a number of other organizations to publicly support the ratification of the ERA by state legislatures. She also helped found a number of other women's groups, including the National Women's Political Caucus and the Women's Coalition for the Third Century, and was the author of the book Feminism for the Health of It. She received her doctorate from the Union of Experimenting Colleges and Universities in 1976 and worked as a women's studies professor at colleges across the country throughout the final decade of her life. She died in Norristown, Pennsylvania, in 1985 at the age of 64.

== Early life ==
Heide was born Wilma Louise Scott on February 26, 1921, in Ferndale, Pennsylvania. Her father was William Robert Scott, a rail brakeman and labor unionist with the Brotherhood of Railroad Trainmen, and her mother was Ada Catherine Scott (née Long), a teacher and shop assistant. She was the third of four children and her two brothers, Ray Eugene and Harold Dwight, would later become nationally recognized sportscasters. The family moved to Connellsville, Pennsylvania, in 1932. She grew up in a traditional household where her mother was the homemaker and her father worked to provide for the family.

Heide was raised Lutheran and regularly attended youth group, but she left the church as a teenager after learning that women could not be ordained. She was a good student in high school, and was a member of the National Honor Society and a high school journalism honor society, Quill and Scroll. She was also actively involved in sports, including basketball, tennis, football, and softball, and was captain of the girls' basketball team in her senior year. She joined a semi-professional basketball team for two and a half years, the Fayette Shamrocks, where she received enough money to cover her expenses and was expected to play up to two or three games an evening against visiting teams from Pennsylvania, Ohio, and West Virginia.

She graduated from Connellsville High School in June 1938, and received a scholarship to Seton Hill University, but her parents refused to allow her to attend as they were unable to afford to pay for college for all the children. Instead, she continued to play with the Fayette Shamrocks and lived at home, picking up odd jobs at a department store or selling products door-to-door.

== Nursing career ==
In 1940, Heide started working as a hospital attendant for a state mental hospital in Torrance, Pennsylvania, where she was frustrated by the conditions for both patients and staff. She joined the trade union which was being organized by two of her colleagues and worked with them for two years to improve pay and working conditions at the hospital. Heide struggled with the job, which had taken a toll on her mental health. She spoke to one of her fellow attendants about being stalked by a woman who intended to kill her, which her colleague recognised as a symptom of her increasing stress and frustration. As a result, she was encouraged to leave the job and instead to attend nursing school.

In 1942, she began training as a registered nurse at Brooklyn State Hospital in Brooklyn, New York, and received a degree in psychiatric nursing. During her studies, she was given the opportunity to meet the First Lady, Eleanor Roosevelt, and they spoke for an hour about social activism. After graduation, Heide returned to the mental hospital where she had previously worked. The conditions had not improved and she began to work to reduce the staff's shifts to forty hours a week and made other changes to fix the consistent mistreatment of staff and patients. She refused to sign untruthful reports given to the Department of Welfare about the treatment of patients and reported the hospital to the department for non-compliance with regulations. Heide was considered by supervisors to be insubordinate and she eventually resigned in frustration, after being falsely accused in a check cashing scandal.

She enrolled at the University of Pittsburgh in 1948, alongside a job as a nurse at the Pennsylvania College for Women. Heide received a Bachelor of Arts degree in sociology in 1950 and was awarded a master's degree in sociology and nursing in 1955. She met Eugene Heide while studying there, and they married in May 1951. The same year, she moved to Oswego, New York, to teach health education and work as a school nurse. While there, she became the first woman to serve as a board member at the local Young Men's Christian Association (YMCA) as there was no equivalent Young Women's Christian Association (YWCA) in the city. During summers, she was a camp nurse at a Girl Scout camp in southern Pennsylvania and a consultant at the Edith Macy Training School for Girl Scout Leaders.

She and her husband moved to South Carolina in 1953, and she took a position as education director in the School of Nursing at Orangeburg. When Eugene was sent to Fort Benning, Georgia, Heide worked as a night supervisor and sociology researcher at the Phoenix City Hospital. She joined the National Association for the Advancement of Colored People (NAACP) and the League of Women Voters (LWV). She received hate mail and threats after registered black voters, which went against the rules of the LWV. She also ran a radio show called 'Time for Living'.

In 1955, the couple moved back to New Kensington, Pennsylvania, where Eugene established a new campus for Pennsylvania State University. Heide worked for the new branch of the university as a nurse, sociology instructor, and administrator. She was involved in the civil rights movement, the parent–teacher association (PTA), and chaired the Home Health Care Advisory Committee of the Miners Clinic. She had her first child, Terry Lynne, the year after the couple returned to Pennsylvania. Her second daughter, Tamara Lee, was born in 1959 and Heide struggled during her pregnancy with severe depression and suicidal thoughts. She was told by a doctor that her depression was caused by a desire to be a man, a comment that infuriated her but "force[d] her to confront her own growing feminism".

== Social activism ==
During the early 1960s, Heide expanded her work in social activism through several channels. She was still teaching students, but also spent her time developing a first model of the Head Start program. She applied for a position as executive director of the Pennsylvania Mental Health Association but was informed that she had not been hired because of her gender. In 1965, she wrote a series of award-winning articles on the impact of civil rights on local Black people for the Valley Daily News and Daily Dispatch. She served as vice chair of the Allegheny County Civil Rights Council and the Westmoreland County Economic Opportunities Program in 1965. She also became the only female member of the Pennsylvania State Human Relations Commission, a position she was appointed to in 1969. Heide remained active in the New Kensington chapter of the NAACP, alongside her work with the American Institutes for Research and beginning to study for her doctorate at the University of Pittsburgh, although she interrupted her degree to focus on her activist causes.

=== Pittsburgh chapter of NOW ===
Heide learned of the National Organization for Women (NOW) in 1967, shortly after the organization was founded. That same year, she founded the Pittsburgh chapter and was elected as president. She also held a number of positions within the national branch of the organization in short succession, becoming Pennsylvania coordinator in September 1967, a member of the national board in November 1967, chair of membership at the 1967 annual conference, and National Membership Coordinator in February 1968. Heide was then elected chairwoman of the organization's national board in March 1970.

Meanwhile, the Pittsburgh chapter quickly grew to forty members within the first few months, and took on a number of cases of local discrimination, including fighting against discrimination in restaurants. The organization chose Stouffer's Restaurant in Oakland, where men were able to sit in a private dining room while women had to eat in the public area. Chapter members staged a sit-in which caught the attention of The Pittsburgh Press. The sit-in was organized by Heide to coincide with the campaign to make gender a protected characteristic in the anti-discrimination ordinance covering employment, housing, and public accommodations. The chapter members, led by Heide, recruited the YWCA, the American Civil Liberties Union (ACLU) and the Allegheny County Council for Civil Rights to join the petition. The Pittsburgh Commission on Human Rights submitted an amendment to the Pittsburgh City Council after hearing testimony from the organizations, including a statement by Heide on October 23, 1968. This ordinance was ultimately signed into law on July 3, 1969.

In 1967, the board of directors of NOW called for each chapter to protest sex-segregated classified advertisements. The Pittsburgh chapter filed a complaint with the Commission on Human Rights against The Pittsburgh Press under the ordinance banning sex discrimination that the City Council had passed. This complaint challenged the practice of the newspaper of separating help wanted advertisements by those employers seeking women or men in columns with different headings. The Commission upheld the complaint under the ordinance and the newspaper filed suit, claiming that the restriction violated its rights under the First Amendment to freedom of the press. The Supreme Court upheld the ban in its 1973 decision in the case Pittsburgh Press Co. v. Pittsburgh Commission on Human Relations, ruling by a 5–4 margin that the practice was discriminatory.

They also led the boycott of Colgate-Palmolive to protest the company's discriminatory practices. The company had a policy that de facto prohibited women from certain positions by imposing a restriction that required employees to lift packages over 30 pounds (14 kg). A court ruling had ordered the company to change its practices but the response was slow. The national board of NOW chose a day for its various chapters to protest the company. Heide carried a sign on the day which proclaimed: 'Colgate-Palmolive is a sex offender'.

On February 17, 1970, Heide and Jean Witter led a group of twenty chapter members to disrupt a hearing on allowing eighteen-year-olds to vote, which was being held by a subcommittee of the United States Senate on constitutional amendments. The women held up signs and Heide gave a speech demanding that the Senate take action to pass the Equal Rights Amendment (ERA). After the disruption, the women met privately with Senator Birch Bayh who agreed to hold hearings on the ERA later in the year, and later credited their demonstration with convincing him to act on the issue. The hearings which resulted from this demonstration were the first ones to be held on the ERA since 1956. The supporters of the amendment were able to give testimony before the Senate Judiciary Committee on September 15, 1970, and Heide was given the opportunity to speak. The ERA finally passed Congress on March 22, 1972.

=== Presidency of NOW ===
Heide was elected president of NOW, succeeding Aileen Hernandez, in September 1971. During her term as president, Heide grew the organization to 700 chapters with 50,000 members worldwide and an annual budget of three-quarters of a million dollars by the time she left office, having started with 3,000 members and a $28,000 budget in 1971. While serving as president, Heide and Eugene divorced in 1972, which made international news. On February 18, 1973, she was re-elected as the president of NOW for her second term.

While president, Heide led the campaign against AT&T for sex discrimination. The Equal Employment Opportunity Commission (EEOC), at NOW's urging, conducted an investigation that found that women employees were not working in all available jobs, which caused them to lose $422 million (equivalent to $3.35 billion in 2025). In 1972, Heide and other members of NOW met with Robert Lilley, the president of AT&T, to discuss the EEOC report and to challenge the inadequacy of the proposed affirmative action plan. However, AT&T refused to cooperate further with NOW and ultimately settled a case with the EEOC for $53 million (equivalent to $408 million in 2025), the largest settlement for employment discrimination at the time.

Heide was also actively recruiting other organizations to support the ERA. The ACLU was opposed to the ERA at the time, as it believed women were covered by the Fourteenth Amendment, but Heide worked with Louise Noun and Pauli Murray to convince the ACLU board to change its position. She also urged NOW members to refuse to join Common Cause, a lobbying organization, until it expressed its support for the ERA; this finally happened after a meeting between John Gardner and Heide, Aileen Hernandez, Ann Scott and Carol Burris. Heide also convinced the LWV, the American Nurses Association (ANA), the AFL–CIO, and the Leadership Conference on Human Rights to support the ERA.

NOW also focused during this time on creating an international women's movement. Heide, Jo Ann Evansgardner, Patricia Hill Burnett and Rona Fields collaborated on an international conference on June 1, 1973, which brought together more than 300 women from 27 countries. Following the conference, Heide became aware of the arrest of three Portuguese women, Maria Isabel Barreno, Maria Teresa Horta and Maria Velho da Costa, for writing the New Portuguese Letters. Heide called a press conference to protest their arrest and a week later, demonstrations were held across the US and Europe to support the women. They were eventually released and Heide was invited to Sweden. She flew over with Sandy Byrd, Judy Pickering and Betty Spaulding and the four women toured the country for ten days, which concluded with Heide being presented with the key to the city of Stockholm.

NOW designated 1973 as its action year against poverty. That summer, Heide testified before the Joint Economic Committee on women's economic problems, arguing that the problems were caused by sexism in government agencies. Despite this focus, some women within the organization did not believe that enough was being done to solve this issue. This was one of several areas of friction within NOW. In the same year, a questionnaire was conducted among the chapters which determined that women of color had little involvement in the organization, even where they were members. Heide encouraged the board to take action on racism, such as issuing a statement that Angela Davis deserved a fair trial, but they refused to take on school desegregation as a feminist issue. There was also a conversation at the time about the role of lesbians in feminist organizations. Heide strongly believed that heterosexism was a feminist issue and she petitioned the board to include it on the agenda.

== Later life ==
Heide chose not to run for a third term as president of NOW in May 1974. Instead she served as chairwoman of the organization's national advisory board in 1974 and 1975, before leaving the organization to focus on her doctorate. After leaving the presidency, Heide focused her attention on other organizations. In 1974, she met with the ANA and challenged them to take on a more political role, a meeting that was later credited with the foundation of the Nurses Coalition for Action and Politics. Heide had also previously assisted with the founding of the National Women's Political Caucus in 1971 and she served on the Policy Council until 1974 and on the advisory board until 1977. She was also involved with the ACLU, the Corporation for Public Broadcasting, the National Board of Partners in Housing, the National Coalition for Human Needs and Budget Priorities and at Social Policy magazine.

She was a co-founder of the Women's Coalition for the Third Century in 1972, in response to a request to consult on the Federal American Revolution Bicentennial Commission. The Coalition urged the organizers to focus on the future instead of the past and to center women and racial minorities, and it later split from the commission to form a new organization that drafted a Declaration of Imperatives and a Declaration of Interdependence. The Declaration of Interdependence was signed on July 4, 1976, and it was formally presented in a ceremony at the Smithsonian Institution on October 3, 1977.

Heide earned her Ph.D. in feminist theory and public policy in 1978 from the Union of Experimenting Colleges and Universities. Her doctoral thesis was titled Feminism for the Health of It, which was published as a book shortly before her death. She worked as a visiting professor for half a decade, beginning her teaching career at Wellesley College and the University of Massachusetts in 1974 and leaving the institutions in 1975 and 1976 respectively. She then moved to Goddard College from 1978 to 1980, before serving as the director of the women's studies program at Sangamon State University in Springfield, Illinois, from 1978 to 1982. She moved to Norristown, Pennsylvania, the same year. She died there at Sacred Heart Hospital at age 64 from a heart attack on May 8, 1985.

Non-profit organization positions
Preceded by Aileen Hernandez	President of the National Organization for Women; 1971–1974	Succeeded by Karen DeCrow
