= Gerald Gardner (mathematician) =

Irish-American mathematician (1926–2009)

Gerald Henry Frazier Gardner (March 2, 1926 – July 25, 2009) was an Irish-American mathematician, geophysicist and social activist whose statistical analysis led to the banning of classified advertising segregated by gender in a 1973 ruling by the Supreme Court of the United States in the case Pittsburgh Press Co. v. Pittsburgh Commission on Human Relations. On a professional basis, he did early work on the use of monitoring seismological vibrations to identify deposits of natural gas that became industry standards.

== Early life and education ==
Gardner was born on March 2, 1926, in Tullamore, Ireland, and attended Trinity College in Dublin, where he majored in physics and mathematics, graduating in 1948. He moved to the United States, earning a masters in 1949 in applied mathematics at the Carnegie Institute of Technology (later known as Carnegie Mellon University) in 1949 and a Ph.D. at Princeton University in mathematical physics in 1953. From 1950 to 1955, he was an honorary scholar at the Dublin Institute for Advanced Studies, where he served as a technical liaison to China.

== Professional career ==
He was hired by Gulf Oil in 1956 at a subsidiary that searched for deposits of oil and natural gas, where he developed techniques in applied seismology. Gardner also served on the faculty at the Carnegie Institute of Technology, Rice University and the University of Houston. He worked for more than two decades for the Gulf Research and Development Company, a subsidiary of Gulf Oil, contributing to significant advances in applied seismology, or methods for finding oil and natural gas deposits. Gardner's relation in seismology carries his name. He later (c. 1980) joined Allied Geophysical Laboratories (AGL) and worked with John McDonald to develop physical and numerical models of oil and gas reservoirs, and was hailed in his day (1988) as being the most advanced numerical modelling researcher in the global geophysical industry.

== Social activism ==
Gardner was what his wife later described as "an activist atheist" and he was more comfortable working in the grassroots as a social activist than in front of a classroom. He and his wife belonged to First Pittsburgh NOW, the local chapter of the National Organization for Women, and he eventually served as the chapter's president.

Wilma Scott Heide of First Pittsburgh took issue with the practice of the Pittsburgh Press of identifying the paper's help wanted jobs as male or female, and filed a complaint in 1969 with the Pittsburgh Commission on Human Relations claiming that this constituted discrimination against women. The Commission on Human Relations held a hearing in January 1970 and Gardner was one of the witnesses called, testifying that there were 1,000 column inches for "Jobs-Male Interest", 400 for female and 100 for male-female ads.

The local commission upheld the complaint, which included statistical evidence gathered by Gardner that showed the unlikelihood of a woman obtaining a job designated for men and described pay differentials between positions designated by gender that "flabbergasted" him. Former NOW president Eleanor Smeal described how Gardner's evidence was "hard intellectual theory based on the math" that "made it understandable, powerfully so."

The newspaper appealed its case to the Supreme Court of the United States, claiming that it was deprived of its rights to freedom of the press guaranteed under the First Amendment. In June 1973, the Supreme Court upheld a Pittsburgh ordinance banning ads that specified the sex of applicants by a 5–4 margin.

He was involved in another lawsuit in 1975, in which the Pittsburgh Bureau of Police was sued by the NAACP and NOW, which claimed that the department had discriminated in hiring women, African Americans and other minorities by the department. In a consent decree in place for 15 years, the department agreed to hire in groups of four that would include a white man, a white woman, a black man and a black woman. Until the decree was overturned following a lawsuit alleging reverse discrimination, the Police Bureau had the highest percentages of female and African-American police officers nationwide.

He also supplied statistical analysis for cases against discount store G. C. Murphy and Kroger supermarkets, calculating the wages that female employees there lost as a result of gender-based discrimination, showing that small differences in pay between men and women when they were hired added up to substantial sums over the period of their employment, by affecting salary increases and opportunities for promotion.

== Personal ==
He lived with his wife in the Hazelwood neighborhood of Pittsburgh.

Gardner died on July 25, 2009, aged 83, at the University of Pittsburgh Medical Center, from leukemia. He was survived by his wife Jo Ann Evans, who adopted the surname "Evansgardner", a merged version of their last names, after their marriage in 1950.
