= Harriet Cooper Alpern =

American activist (1923–2010)

Harriet Cooper Alpern (1923 – April 25, 2010) was an American activist. She was one of the co-founders of the Michigan chapter of the National Organization for Women and she was involved with the organization's public relations.

== Early life ==
Alpern was born in 1923. She grew up in Detroit, Michigan, on Chicago Boulevard in the Boston–Edison Historic District, where she was friends with Patricia Hill Burnett. While her twin brother attended Cranbrook School, she was a student at its sister school, Kingswood School where she was involved in theater and as a reporter for the student newspaper. She graduated in 1940 and was described in her senior yearbook as having "unconscious humor". After graduation, she attended the University of Michigan where she met her husband, E. Bryce Alpern. She had three children: Dwight, Abbey and Jimmy.

== Activism ==
Alpern first became involved with the National Organization for Women (NOW) in 1969 when she helped to found the Michigan chapter in Detroit. She was inspired by her Judaism, which encouraged her to "do [her] part to making the world a better place". She served as vice president of public relations for the chapter between 1970 and 1973. As the result of her background in public relations, she became involved in media relations. She negotiated with the local ABC affiliate, WXYZ-TV, on FCC compliance and the station agreed to consider supporting women in managerial and technical positions. Following the positive results of this partnership, she joined the station's women's advisory board between 1971 and 1975. She also joined the offshoot of this group, the Michigan Media Project, in 1975.

She founded a program which monitored print and electronic media to ascertain if it was balanced and non-sexist. She was the producer of two programs analyzing the portrayal of women in consumer advertising. 'What are Big Girls Made Of?' examined the portrayal of women as sex objects and 'What's Wrong With Wrinkles' focused on the absence of older women in advertisements. During the 1970s, Alpern was a committee member of 'Women in the News', which advanced a class-action lawsuit alleging employment discrimination by The Detroit News. Outside of her work with NOW, she founded the company Program Resources to produce media for the women's movement and for educational use.

As the Detroit Athletic Club (DAC) was closed to women, Alpern was one of forty women who invaded it while wearing high heels. The Michigan chapter of NOW was involved in the national conference with Bell Telephone in relation to sex discrimination. The group also invaded a news conference of the Catholic Bishops with signs stating "Jesus was a feminist". She designed and printed posters for the League of Women Voters in the Oakland Area and Women's Action for New Directions (WAND) to encourage women to vote. She was an advocate for women running for public office, particularly where they ran on a platform of abortions rights and pay equity. She was chair of a fundraiser for the Equal Rights Amendment (ERA) in 1982 and a member of the planning committee that focused on educating female politicians and activists on the use of mass media.

== Death ==
Alpern died on April 25, 2010, at the age of 87. She was interred at Clover Hill Park Cemetery.
