= Mary Ann Pollar =

- Born: 1927
- Died: September 11, 1999 (aged 71–72)
- Occupation(s): Concert promoter; Organizer; Administrator
- Years active: 1950s–1970s;
- Spouse: Henry Pollar
- Children: 1

Mary Ann Pollar (1927–1999) was a California-based concert promoter and founder of the Rainbow Sign, a prominent African American cultural center in Berkeley that operated from 1971 to 1977. Later she was also a transit administrator.

== Early life ==
Pollar "descended from a family of Baptist preachers". She was raised first in Texas, near the Mexican border, and at age twelve, she moved with her family to Chicago, where she later attended Roosevelt College, studying labor education.

Her husband Henry Pollar worked for Bechtel as an engineer.

== Concert promotion ==
Pollar began promoting concerts in the 1950s in the San Francisco Bay Area. Pollar had an enduring friendship with the folk singer Odetta, for whom she named her daughter Odette in 1955. Rolling Stone reported that Pollar was responsible for Bob Dylan's first appearance on the West Coast, in 1964 at the Berkeley Community Theater. Odette Pollar reported that before booking Dylan's first West Coast concert, her mother had "turned him down twice, because she'd never heard of him". As a concert promoter, Pollar booked Odetta, Dylan, and other artists that included Sonny Terry and Brownie McGhee, and many others, many of whom she first introduced to the San Francisco area. A project on historical documentation at the University of California, Berkeley, wrote that

Many rock music fans today are familiar with the names Chet Helms and Bill Graham, but with the exception of a couple of tiny mentions in Dylan biographies, Mary Ann Pollar has remained largely unknown. This is remarkable considering the long roster of now-famous performers who were first introduced to the Bay Area by Pollar. To list only a few: Joan Baez, Judy Collins, The Clancy Brothers, Arlo Guthrie, Curtis Mayfield, Pete Seeger, Peter Paul and Mary, Buffy St. Marie, Simon and Garfunkel, Nina Simone, and Frank Zappa.

== Rainbow Sign ==
In 1971 Pollar founded The Rainbow Sign, an African American cultural center that operated from 1971 to 1977 on Berkeley's Grove Street (now known as Martin Luther King Jr. Way). Slate described Rainbow Sign as having been "brainstormed into existence" by Pollar. She took the center's name from the verse of the spiritual Mary Don't You Weep ("God gave Noah the rainbow sign, no more water the fire next time!"), a verse also alluded to by James Baldwin in his book The Fire Next Time (1963). Pollar "envisioned an art gallery, cultural center, meeting place, and restaurant," and "as a concept and organization, the cultural center was meant to exist as a bridge across all borders—ethnic, national and political. Rainbow Sign concerned itself with sustaining and strengthening the diversity essential to any viable movement toward the liberation of all people."

Performers, writers and artists who were present at Rainbow Sign included Samella Lewis, James Baldwin, Kenny Burrell, Nina Simone, Joyce Carol Thomas, Maya Angelou, Pharoah Sanders, Oscar Brown Jr., Josephine Baker, and Mrs. We. E. Be. Dubois. Yet although Pollar characterized such cultural figures as "giants [who all] stand at the top of what they do,"

Many of the performers who have come to Rainbow Sign do so for little or no remuneration.... They come to Rainbow Sign for its ambience. They hear that there is nothing else like Rainbow Sign and they offer to appear. And the whole purpose is basically educational, director Pollar says. "Hidden under everything we do, the best entertainment we put on, there's always a message: Look about you; think about this."

== Later years ==
In 1978 Pollar "began a new career at AC Transit, where she organized a local union for management employees."

Pollar died of lung cancer on September 11, 1999.
