= The Rainbow Sign =

African-American cultural center in Berkeley

Coordinates: 37.8599°N 122.2719°W

Rainbow Sign
- Type: Cultural center (1971–1977)
- Location: 2640 Grove St. (now 2640 Martin Luther King, Jr., Way), Berkeley, California

The Rainbow Sign was an African-American cultural center in Berkeley, California, that operated from 1971 to 1977. Vice President of the United States Kamala Harris frequently attended the center as a child, and described it as influential on her.

The Guardian stated that "Rainbow Sign was a little bit of everything to the black community.... The space provided discounted meals to children, staged concerts for Nina Simone and held book signings for Maya Angelou and Alice Walker."

== Background ==
Slate characterized Rainbow Sign as

the East Bay’s Black mecca. Housed in a former funeral parlor designed in the Spanish Colonial Revival style, Rainbow Sign had innate grandeur—chandeliers and arched leaded windows, vaulted ceilings with hand-painted floral designs, an organ loft suspended above what became the main stage. The center thrummed with life: Its bustling bar-restaurant served up soul food seven days a week, and the walls of its program hall were always hung with new art exhibitions. Rentable conference rooms in the back were put to use by all manner of community groups, and any night of the week there was some cultural event to take advantage of—a Bobby Hutcherson concert, a screening of a film smuggled out of South Africa, a trailblazing work of choreo-theater, a book party with Rosa Guy or Maya Angelou. It was a space for learning, one that boasted a library stocked with the latest Black Arts journals and a studio that held workshops on art, music, and dance. And it was a space for festivity. On some occasions—for instance, to host a jazz festival’s after-party or a record-breaking, six-day-long poetry reading—Rainbow Sign was even open through the night and into the morning.

Slate also stated that Rainbow Sign had been "brainstormed into existence" by Mary Ann Pollar, who took the center’s name from the verse of a spiritual ("God gave Noah the rainbow sign, no more water the fire next time!"), a verse also alluded to by James Baldwin in his book The Fire Next Time (1963). Pollar "envisioned an art gallery, cultural center, meeting place, and restaurant. She scoured Oakland and Berkeley for a property to suit her purpose and finally settled on a dilapidated funeral home on Grove Street (now Martin Luther King, Jr. Way) in Berkeley."

Rainbow Sign was the site of a 1971 gathering that led to the founding of Black Women Organized for Political Action (BWOPA). On its website, BWOPA states that "In April 1971, WOPA [Women Organized for Political Action] put out a call for women who were interested in political action and over 350 women convened at what then was the Bay Area's black culture center, 'The Rainbow Sign' to form what is now known as Black Women Organized for Political Action."

== Influence on Kamala Harris ==
Kamala Harris, who was elected to be Vice President of the United States in November 2020, has mentioned that Rainbow Sign was influential on her as a child. Reporting on her 2019 announcement in Oakland, California of her campaign for president, The Washington Post stated that "Harris infused her speech with her biography.... The stage was five miles from the yellow duplex where she grew up and four miles from Rainbow Sign, a black cultural center where she went as a young girl to cook, dance and hear prominent black leaders."

In describing how Harris's mother Shyamala Gopalan "surrounded [her daughters] with Black role models and immersed them in Black culture", the Associated Press mentioned Harris's frequent attendance at Rainbow Sign, described as "a former Berkeley funeral home that was transformed into a vibrant Black cultural center."

In her memoir, The Truths We Hold, Harris stated that her mother, her sister, and herself

went to Rainbow Sign often. Everyone in the neighborhood knew us as "Shyamala and the girls." We were a unit. A team. And when we'd show up, we were always greeted with big smiles and warm hugs. Rainbow Sign had a communal orientation and an inclusive vibe. It was a place designed to spread knowledge, awareness, and power. Its informal motto was "For the love of people." Families with children were especially welcome at Rainbow Sign—an approach that reflected both the values and the vision of the women at its helm.
