= Alma Speed Fox =

American activist

- Born: Teressa Speed; February 18, 1923; Cleveland, Ohio, United States
- Died: January 24, 2022 (aged 98); Pittsburgh, Pennsylvania, United States
- Resting place: Homewood Cemetery, Pittsburgh, Pennsylvania
- Employer(s): US Department of the Interior, Bureau of Mines
- Organization(s): Freedom Unlimited; NAACP
- Known for: Civil rights and women's rights activism
- Board member of: Gwen's Girls; Women and Girls Foundation
- Spouse(s): Name (m. x; died x ) Gerald W. Fox (m. 1947; died 2012)

Alma Speed Fox (February 18, 1923 - January 24, 2022) was an African-American civil rights activist born in Cleveland, Ohio and based in Pittsburgh, Pennsylvania. She is considered the "Mother" of Pittsburgh's civil rights movement.

== Early life ==
Alma Speed Fox was born Teressa Speed on February 18, 1923 to Beatrice Speed (née Gray) in Cleveland, Ohio. She grew up attending a predominantly white school and became a member of the National Association for the Advancement of Colored People (NAACP) when she was thirteen. She moved to Pittsburgh, Pennsylvania, in 1949 where she married Gerald Fox and the couple had five children. She started working for the Bureau of Mines in the U.S. Department of the Interior as a file clerk in 1956. She quit her job to raise her children in 1966 and re-joined the Bureau a decade later as the Equal Employment Opportunity Manager for the Eastern Area.

== Activism ==
=== NAACP ===
Fox joined the Pittsburgh chapter of the NAACP during the 1950s. She was involved in the majority of the marches organized by the association and the protests against the Duquesne Light Company. She was the executive director of the Pittsburgh chapter from 1966 to 1971 and was a member of the national board. She worked with other members of the NAACP to found Freedom Unlimited in 1968 and served as the non-profit's executive vice president. She was a participant in every march from the Freedom Corner during the 1950s and 60s, and she participated in her first march at the age of 16.

On April 7, 1968, during the riots following the assassination of Martin Luther King Jr., she organized the permits and notified authorities of a planned peaceful march on the National Day of Mourning from the Freedom Corner to Point State Park. She negotiated with the police to allow the march to continue, despite the riots, and led 3,500 marchers downtown. They encountered police in riot gear blocking Centre Avenue and Fox ducked under the legs of an officer to continue the march and was arrested. Her release was negotiated by Byrd Brown, president of the Pittsburgh chapter of the NAACP, and David Craig, public safety director, although she refused to leave the police car until the march was allowed to continue. Their son, Carl, was one of the National Guardsmen who patrolled the streets later that night.

=== National Organization for Women ===
Fox was encouraged by Ina Braden and Wilma Scott Heide to join the National Organization for Women (NOW) but was initially hesitant as she felt that she "didn't need another revolution". She helped to organize a protest in 1968, demanding that Sears hire more Black employees as the store in East Liberty had only twelve Black employees out of a total of 500. Fox worked with the NAACP to picket the shop, as well as holding a sit-in with a number of other organizations, including NOW, the Young Women's Christian Association (YWCA) and Women in the Urban Crisis. The protest successfully convinced Sears to increase its number of Black employees by 30 percent and convinced Fox to join NOW. She served as president of the East Hills chapter of NOW and one of the chairs of the Pennsylvania Women's Political caucus. She was a member of the national board and the Gwen's Girls board. She served as a delegate for Pennsylvania in the 1978 National Women's Conference.

=== Later activism ===
She was appointed by Governor Milton Shapp as a co-chair, along with Lynn Scheffey, on the Governor's Commission on the Status of Women which was founded in February 1972 to implement the provisions of the Pennsylvania Equal Rights Amendment. Along with Jo Ann Evansgardner, she was a chair of Shirley Chisholm's presidential campaign in Pennsylvania. In 1975, Fox ran for a seat on the Pittsburgh City Council for the 13th ward. She was also a member of the Pittsburgh Human Relations Commission for thirty years between 1972 and 2002 and a member of the Pittsburgh Housing Authority.

== Later life and legacy ==
She was honored by the Pennsylvania NOW with the Wilma Scott Heide Pioneer Feminist Award in 2007. She was honored in an exhibit titled "In Sisterhood: The Women's Movement in Pittsburgh" at the Pittsburgh Center for the Arts in January 2009. She was honored with a key to the city of Pittsburgh, the highest civilian honor, by Mayor Bill Peduto at a ceremony in October 2018. She was the first woman to receive a key from Peduto.

Fox died on January 24, 2022, at the age of 98.

In March 2023, the city of Pittsburgh honorarily named Kirkpatrick Street in the Hill District "Alma Speed Fox Way"
