= Richard Wald =

American television executive (1930–2022)

- Born: Richard Charles Wald; March 19, 1930; New York City, U.S.
- Died: May 13, 2022 (aged 92); New Rochelle, New York, U.S.
- Education: Columbia College (BA); Clare College, Cambridge
- Occupations: Television executive; journalist
- Employer(s): NBC News (1967–1977); ABC News (1978–1999)
- Spouse: Edith Leslie (m. 1954; died 2021)
- Children: 3

Richard Charles Wald (March 19, 1930 – May 13, 2022) was an American television executive who served as the president of NBC News from 1973 to 1977 and senior vice president of ABC News from 1978 to 1999.

== Early life and education ==
Wald was born Manhattan in 1930; his father was an Austrian immigrant. He went to Stuyvesant High School and then Columbia College, where he graduated with a Bachelor of Arts degree in 1952, and rented an apartment with three of his classmates: future ABC News president Roone Arledge, PBS and NBC News president Larry Grossman, and The New York Times executive editor Max Frankel. He then studied at Clare College, Cambridge on a fellowship, and received a master's degree in English.

== Career ==
Wald began his career in journalism with The New York Herald Tribune, where he served as a reporter and foreign correspondent, and eventually rose to become the paper's last managing editor before its demise in 1966. His colleagues at the Tribune included major figures of the New Journalism movement, such as Jim Bellows, Jimmy Breslin, Gail Sheehy, and Tom Wolfe. He also served as the Sunday editor of the New York World Journal Tribune and assistant managing editor of The Washington Post before joining NBC in 1967.

In January 1973, Wald became president of NBC News. During his time there, screenwriter Paddy Chayefsky followed him at work for two days while writing the film Network, and he is considered the inspiration for William Holden's character in the film. In 1976, Wald gave a speech in which he forecasted that television news would move beyond half-hour, nightly broadcasts and eventually expand to a continuous format, further predicting that a channel solely devoted to news would emerge within ten years. Following the development of the 24-hour news cycle, with networks like CNN (which launched four years after his speech), his remarks received additional attention and were regarded as prescient.

Wald left the network in 1977 due to friction with the management over unsatisfactory ratings. Roone Arledge, then president of ABC News, hired him to run the day-to-day operations of the news division in 1978. Wald was promoted to senior vice president for editorial quality, nicknamed the "ethics czar" of the network, tasked with reviewing that prospective stories met journalistic standards. As Arlege's deputy, he titled and helped launch Nightline in 1979, and brought in reporters such as David Brinkley to the network. He retired from ABC News in 1999. Afterward, Wald began teaching at the Columbia Graduate School of Journalism, and later became the Fred W. Friendly Professor of Professional Practice in Media Society Emeritus.

== Personal life ==
Wald was married to his wife, the former Edith Leslie, from 1954 until her death in 2021, and they had three children. His son, Jonathan Wald, is a media executive who was the executive producer of NBC Nightly News and was the senior vice president of Programming and Development at MSNBC.

Wald had a stroke on May 8, 2022, and died from complications five days later, on May 13, at a hospital in New Rochelle, New York, aged 92.
