= Tami Heide =

Tami Heide, "The girl with two first names," is an American radio personality. Heide started out as a disc jockey on Emerson College station WERS in Boston, Massachusetts in 1977. She later served as music director of Massachusetts Institute of Technology station WMBR. Heide worked at WBCN in Boston from 1984 to 1991, when she segued to KROQ-FM in Los Angeles, California. In 2005, she moved to KCBS-FM (Jack FM) in Los Angeles, where she was responsible for writing much of the dialogue for the on-air voice. She also hosted the on air daily “Jacktivities“. Heide left KCBS-FM in November 2016. In June 2017, she joined the Soul of Southern California, 94.7 the WAVE KTWV for weekends and fill-in-work. She is also the host and executive producer of Open Line, the public affairs program that airs weekends on the 4 Audacy FM stations in SoCal. In August 2023, Heide began hosting KROQ Flashback Sunday. Heide’s mother was American feminist author and social activist Wilma Scott Heide.

== Radio affiliation ==
- 1977–79: WERS
- 1979–84: WMBR
- 1984–91: WBCN
- 1991–2004: KROQ-FM
- 2005–16: KCBS-FM
- 2017-: KTWV
