= Patricia Hill Burnett =

American artist and activist

- Born: September 5, 1920; Brooklyn, New York
- Died: December 29, 2014 (aged 94); Bloomfield Hills, Michigan
- Education: Goucher College; Instituto Allende; Wayne State University
- Occupations: Artist; Women's Rights Activist
- Spouses: William Anding Lange (m. 1945, divorced): Harry Burnett; Robert Siler
- Children: 4

Patricia Hill Burnett (September 5, 1920 – December 29, 2014), born Patricia Hill, was an American portrait artist and women's rights activist.

== Early life and education ==
Patricia Burnett was born in 1920 in Brooklyn, New York. Her parents separated when she was young, and she and her mother moved to Toledo, Ohio. Later, her mother married a physician who worked at Henry Ford Hospital, and the family moved to Detroit, Michigan.

Burnett was named Miss Michigan in 1942. She went on to become a runner up to Miss America the same year. In the latter pageant, she was named "Miss Congeniality."

Burnett started painting portraits at a very young age. At the age of twelve, she earned a scholarship to study at the Toledo Museum of Art for four years. She also began selling portraits for 25 dollars at the age of fourteen. At age 16, Burnett began enrolled at Goucher College in Baltimore, Maryland, where she obtained a fine arts degree. For her graduate education, she studied at the Instituto Allende in Mexico and Wayne State University in Detroit.

Burnett also personally studied under Sarkis Sarkisian, Walter Midener, and John Carroll.

Burnett voiced the girlfriends of The Green Hornet and the Lone Ranger on their respective radio series.

== Activism ==
In 1962, Burnett became the first woman to occupy a studio in the Scarab Club, a collective of artists in Detroit. She reported multiple incidents of gender discrimination that she experienced in the club. For example, while she was in the restroom, other members of the club would jiggle the door handle in an attempt to "set her on edge." After a few months, however, they stopped and gave her a gold key for the restroom. Burnett kept a personal studio at the Scarab Club until 1987. She also went on to serve on the Scarab Club's board of directors for two terms.

Burnett advocated for opening up several other local organizations, including the Detroit Athletic Club, to women. Prior to her efforts, women had to enter the club through the back door. After Burnett organized protests, however, the club changed its rules regarding women.

Burnett became increasingly interested in activism after reading The Feminine Mystique by Betty Friedan. She decided to reach out to Friedan to report an incident where a male portrait client asked Burnett to sign her initials instead of her full name, as he did not want anyone to know a woman painted the portrait. Burnett refused to comply with this request and signed her full name. Friedan was impressed by Burnett's actions and resolve, and in 1969 Friedan tasked Burnett with creating and heading the Michigan chapter of the National Organization for Women (NOW). Burnett officially launched the Michigan chapter of NOW on March 30, 1969. She served as its president until 1972.

According to Katherine Turk's's 2023 history of NOW, Burnett just showed up at Friedan's apartment one day in 1969 wearing a "chinchilla hat and muff." That and her Midwestern Republican background immediately convinced Burnett's feminist hero that she "was exactly the sort of NOW member Friedan was looking for."

Burnett went on to serve as the chair of NOW's international board between 1971 and 1975. She organized NOW's first international conference in the fall of 1972; NOW representatives from twenty-two countries attended. Burnett organized this conference along with Jo Ann Evansgardner, Rona Fields, and Wilma Scott Heide. The conference was held at Harvard Divinity School and Lesley College, in Cambridge, Massachusetts.

Due to her involvement with women's rights movements, Burnett was put on a watch list by the Federal Bureau of Investigation and the Michigan State Police.

In 1972, Burnett was named to the Michigan Women's Commission by then-governor William Milliken. She went on to serve four terms on the commission, including two terms as the commission's chair. In addition, she chaired the Association of Commissions for Women, co-founded Michigan's International Women's Forum, served on the board of the Detroit International Institute, co-convened the Michigan Republican Women's Task Force, and served as the vice-president of the French-American Chamber of Commerce in Detroit. She also lectured for the United States State Department's Bureau of Educational and Cultural Affairs.

Burnett was also a life member of the National Association for the Advancement of Colored People (NAACP) and a co-founder of Women in the House and Senate (WISH).

== Arts career ==
As an artist, Burnett is best known as a society painter. Over the course of her career, she painted portraits of many influential people, including Ruth Bader Ginsburg, Margaret Thatcher, Betty Ford, Corazon Acquino, Joyce Carol Oates, Barbara Walters, Rosa Parks, and Indira Gandhi. She was also the first woman commissioned to paint portraits of a Detroit mayor and a Michigan governor. When asked how she got to paint those famous individuals, she reportedly remarked "Oh honey, I just called them."

She remarked that it took her three months usually to complete a painting to a point that she was ready to show it to her subject. She even would take down old paintings of hers that hung from her friend's walls, and update them. In addition to portraits, she also painted floral still-life paintings and created sculptures.

Over the years, Burnett taught multiple portrait painting seminars.

Throughout the course of her life, Burnett's exhibited her work in over four hundred juried shows. She also had 40 solo shows. She created well-over one thousand works. Burnett's art appears in museums in many countries.

== Personal life ==
She married a surgeon, William Anding Lange, in 1945. They had one child together. She later divorced her Lange and subsequently married Harry Burnett, who was a businessman. They had three children together. Burnett's four children are William Lange, Dr. Barry Burnett, Terrill Hill Burnett, and Hillary Hill Burnett.

After Harry Burnett's death in 1979, she married Robert Siler, who she met in an airport. Siler died in 2013.

Burnett co-wrote her autobiography True Colors: An Artist's Journey from Beauty Queen to Feminist with Jack Lessenberry. It was released in 1995.

Burnett died at the age of 94 in Bloomfield Hills, Michigan on 29 December 2014. She continued painting until six months before her death.

== Honors and awards ==
- Feminist of the Year (1974) - NOW
- Silver Salute Award (1976) - Michigan State University
- Named one of the world's Ten Most Distinguished Women (1977) - Northwood University
- Inducted into the Michigan's Women's Hall of Fame (1987)
- Named Michigan Woman of the Year (1993)
- Named one of the Top Twelve Portraitists in the United States (1994) - Council of Leading American Portrait Painters
- Honorary Doctoral Degree (2009) - College for Creative Studies
- Best Portrait - Paris American Figure Show
- First Prize - Boston Figure Painting Show
- Portrait First Prize - Venice, Italy Life Painting Show
