= Black Women Organized for Political Action =

Advocacy organization founded in 1968

Black Women Organized for Political Action (BWOPA) is a 501(c)(4) nonprofit political advocacy organization with the goal of motivating and supporting Black women in American politics. It was founded in 1968 in California after branching off from the Bay Area Women for Dellums, a group of politically active women who fundraised for Ron Dellums' run for congressional office. They encourage African American women to be more involved in politics so that action can be taken to address their oppressions. The organization focuses on the intersectionality of issues pertaining to race and gender by encouraging African American women to become involved in the political process. Dezie Woods-Jones was elected president of the organization in 1970.Black feminist organizing scholars recognize BWOPA as a constituent of a much larger network of post-civil rights era organizations aiming to increase the political power of Black women both by participating in electoral politics and by developing Black women into community leaders.

== Ideological foundations ==
The organizing model used by BWOPA demonstrates many principles of Black feminist political thinking, especially the acknowledgment of race, gender, and class in determining political access and participation. Researchers have characterized organizations like BWOPA to be functioning in an intersectional model that connects systemic inequities to political underrepresentation.

BWOPA was more concerned with institutional politics, such as candidate support, advocacy in public policy, and voter mobilization, unlike some of the Black feminist organizations of the same time, which emphasized autonomous organizing and working outside of electoral systems.This formed the role which enabled the organization to serve as a transition between the grassroots activism of the post-civil rights era and the official political frameworks. This positioning allowed the organization to function as a bridge between grassroots activism and formal political structures in the post–civil rights era.

== History ==
The group that became Black Women Organized for Political Action formed in 1968 after expanding from a smaller group called the Bay Area Women for Dellums or "Dames for Dellums". The group was formed by 12 women in the San Francisco Bay Area, including co-founder Aileen Hernandez. Until 1970, the group functioned under co-chairs. In 1970, they elected their first president, Dezie Woods-Jones, who had been a community activist working to address issues concerning education, poverty, and women's empowerment. In 1971, the group officially became Black Women Organized for Political Action.

BWOPA's early meetings were held at The Rainbow Sign, an African American community center in Berkeley, California. Along with campaigning for Ron Dellums, they contributed to Warren Widener's successful campaign for mayor of Berkeley in 1971. In 1973, some women involved in BWOPA, including Hernandez and Ernestine Eckstein, formed a more radical Black feminist group, Black Women Organized for Action (BWOA), to focus on Black women's concerns rather than fundraising for men running for office.

BWOPA contributed to the elections of several women who were the first African American women representatives in their areas. Ella Hill Hutch was a charter member of Black Women Organized for Political Action. BWOPA supported the election of Maxine Waters to the California State Assembly in 1976. Kamala Harris was a BWOPA chapter member in the 1990s, and the organization supported her run for San Francisco district attorney in 2003.

Archival materials related to BWOPA are held in the collections of the African American Museum and Library at Oakland. In 2025, Oakland mayor Barbara Lee honored Woods-Jones for decades of leadership for BWOPA. The emergence of BWOPA was a part of the wider changes in Black political organizing practice in the late 1960s and 1970s, as more Black political activists began to focus on independent Black political power and leadership. The formation of the organization and other Black women groups brought into the limelight the tensions between electoral politics and more radical feminist politics, especially as far as the role of Black women in supporting male political candidates as opposed to the role of developing independent political agendas.

== Programs ==
BWOPA provides leadership training to help women run for political office in a program called Training Institute for Leadership Enrichment (TILE). It also runs the Dezie Woods Jones (DWJ) Public Policy leadership program, a training program for policy advocates.

The organization focuses on advocacy for health, education, criminal justice, and economic security:

- BWOPA works to raise awareness of the health disparities in the health system. They advocate for political action that will increase access to quality health care for African American women.
- BWOPA advocates for political action to increase the rates of African American high school graduation and college completion rates. They aim to improve access to early education, safe school environments, high-quality education, and more support for funding for schools.
- BWOPA works to reduce the high rates of African American incarceration by providing alternatives to incarceration for youths, encourage rehabilitation and assistance in reintegrating after incarceration.
- BWOPA works to reduce the disparity of African American unemployment rates by providing job training, financial education, and support for entrepreneurship.

Political training programs like the Training Institute for Leadership Enrichment (TILE) represent a larger vision by the Black women organizations in institutionalizing leadership training and representation in the government. Scholars have found these programs as essential instruments of bridging the gaps in political access and political participation by African American women.

== Legacy and significance ==
BWOPA has been known to be one of the oldest Black women political advocacy organizations in California. Its activity has led to the election and creation of several African American women leaders and has assisted in institutionalizing access points to Black women in electoral politics.

The organization is also said to be a part of an even larger historical tradition of Black women political organizing in the United States, and related organizations like the National Council of Negro Women, which also focused on civic participation and leadership development. The long-term effect of BWOPA is dual focus on grassroots mobilization and institutional political involvement, which contributes to the expansion of the representation and influence policy agenda on the African American populations.
