= Jim Bellows =

American journalist

- Born: November 12, 1922; Detroit, Michigan
- Died: March 6, 2009 (aged 86); Santa Monica, California
- Occupation: Journalist

James Gilbert Bellows (November 12, 1922 – March 6, 2009) was an American journalist of the 20th century. Bellows has been credited with the inspiration and nurture of many leading writers of the New Journalism during the 1960s and 1970s.

== Early life ==
Bellows was born to a successful Detroit salesman and his family in 1922. While he was a child, his parents moved to the Cleveland, Ohio, area. Following a common practice of families with "aspirations", and with financial assistance from an aunt, he was sent at 13 years of age to attend South Kent School — a private college-preparatory boarding school for boys in South Kent, Connecticut, graduating in 1940. "We were not cradled through those years, and it (South Kent) was a wonderful place to build character." The 1940 yearbook shows his nickname as "Maggot", a fond reference to his 5'0" stature, to which he owed his success as coxwain for the SKS crew."

Bellows went on to attend Kenyon College, before serving as a Navy aviator, training to fly the F6F "Hellcat" in World War II. Although he tried to accelerate his training, he didn't ship out until after the war, when he flew from a carrier based near Guam and Saipan. He returned to Kenyon after his service, and graduated in 1947 with a B.A. in philosophy.

== Editorships ==
Among the organizations Bellows served, Bellows had editorial positions at:

- city editor of the Columbus Ledger (1947–1950)
  - started as a cub (rookie) reporter, received national attention – and a promotion to city editor – after reporting on his being assaulted by local (Georgia) members of the Ku Klux Klan;
- The Atlanta Journal (1950–1957)
- Detroit Free Press (1957–1959)
  - his hometown paper
- The Miami News (1959–1960)
- editor of the New York Herald Tribune (1961–1966)
  - "We couldn't compete with the resources of the Times; we had to establish a niche for ourselves. The answer was to rediscover New York.";
- associate editor of the Los Angeles Times (1967–1974)
  - he described the Times as "the velvet coffin"
- editor of The Washington Star (1975–1978)
- editor of the Los Angeles Herald Examiner (1978–1981)
- managing editor of Entertainment Tonight (1981–1983)
- executive editor of ABC World News Tonight (1983–1986)

Time and again, Bellows served as editor of underdog, "second" newspapers in large cities. He established a reputation as an innovator whose style of refined sensationalism challenged the leading rival newspapers—namely, The Washington Post and The New York Times. His eloquent, often humorous, and self-effacing style attracted, nurtured, and often inspired a new generation of young writers including Judith Crist, Tom Wolfe, Jimmy Breslin, Denis Hamill, Gail Sheehy, Maureen Dowd and Tony Castro. At the Herald Tribune, it was Bellows' initiative to hire Esquire editor Clay Felker and create a new Sunday supplement focused on local issues and events; within two years it became the still-popular New York magazine.

Richard Wald, Fred W. Friendly Professor of Professional Practice in Media and Society at Columbia University (and former ABC News "ethics czar") said, “Jim changed the way a lot of newspapers look today, in the sense of making a page of newsprint more inviting and understandable. And just as he made great innovations in how newspapers looked, he changed the way they read.”

Bellows's memoir, The Last Editor: How I saved the New York Times, the Washington Post, and the Los Angeles Times from Dullness and Complacency (2002), was also made into a PBS documentary. It chronicled his (mostly unsuccessful) fight to save the underdog papers at a time when newspapers were the dominant media in some of the most turbulent times of the United States. In the process, he claimed “The New York Herald Tribune made The New York Times a livelier paper than it was before... The Washington Star made The Washington Post a less institutional paper. And the Los Angeles Times was put on its mettle by the Los Angeles Herald Examiner..."

He also held positions at USA Today: The Television Show, the Prodigy online news service, the Los Angeles Daily News, and others.

== Singular accomplishments ==
In April 1963, Bellows published Martin Luther King Jr.'s "Letter from Birmingham Jail" on the front page of the New York Herald Tribune.

While editor of the Los Angeles Herald Examiner, intrigued by the absence of coverage for the shooting death of a 39-year-old black woman, Bellows initiated a major reporting examination of the conduct of the Los Angeles Police Department, a subject previously ignored or avoided by the area's new outlets.

== Personal life ==
Bellows married Marian Raines with whom he had three daughters, Amelia, Priscilla and Felicia, prior to the couple's divorce. He married Maggie Savoy, who died in 1970, and then Keven Ryan, with whom he had a daughter Justine.

== Death ==
Bellows died on March 6, 2009, of Alzheimer's disease at a nursing home in Santa Monica.
