= Gardner's relation =

Equation that relates seismic P-wave velocity to the bulk density of the lithology

Gardner's relation, or Gardner's equation, named after Gerald H. F. Gardner and L. W. Gardner, is an empirically derived equation that relates seismic P-wave velocity to the bulk density of the lithology in which the wave travels. The equation reads:

$$\rho = \alpha V_p^{\beta}$$

where $\rho$ is bulk density given in g/cm^{3}, $V_p$ is P-wave velocity given in ft/s, and $\alpha$ and $\beta$ are empirically derived constants that depend on the geology. Gardner et al. proposed that one can obtain a good fit by taking $\alpha = 0.23$ and $\beta = 0.25$. Assuming this, the equation is reduced to:

$$\rho = 0.23 V_p^{0.25},$$

where the unit of $V_p$ is feet/s.

If $V_p$ is measured in m/s, $\alpha = 0.31$ and the equation is:

$$\rho = 0.31 V_p^{0.25}.$$

This equation is very popular in petroleum exploration because it can provide information about the lithology from interval velocities obtained from seismic data. The constants $\alpha$ and $\beta$ are usually calibrated from sonic and density well log information but in the absence of these, Gardner's constants are a good approximation.
