= Dorothy Roe =

American newspaper editor (1904–1985)

- Born: May 18, 1904; Alba, Missouri, U.S.
- Died: March 24, 1985 (aged 80)
- Education: University of Missouri
- Occupation: Journalist
- Years active: 1924–1984

Dorothy Roe Lewis (May 18, 1904 – March 24, 1985) was an American newspaper editor and journalist. She was a syndicated columnist and the women's editor for the Associated Press for nineteen years.

== Early life ==
Roe was born on May 18, 1904, in Alba, Missouri. Her parents were Daniel and Anna Tibbs Roe. She attended school in Webb City, where she served as the art editor for the school yearbook in her senior year. She planned to study education at university and become a teacher but she was influenced by her English teacher, Henrietta Crotty, to apply for a scholarship to become a writer instead. Roe graduated as salutatorian in 1921 and received a scholarship to study journalism at the University of Missouri, graduating in 1924. While at the university, she was a reporter for the Columbia Missourian.

== Career ==
Roe began working at a newspaper in El Dorado, Arkansas, where her parents had moved. She was a shopping columnist for the El Dorado Daily Times before becoming a full-time reporter. While on a trip to Los Angeles, California, she took a job with the Los Angeles Examiner as the writer of their shopping column. A few months later, she moved back to Arkansas and then to Chicago, where she spent a few months as a feature writer with the Chicago Herald-Examiner.

From there she moved to New York City, where she worked as a part-time writer for the International News Service (INS) and a freelance feature writer with the New York World. Then she moved to the Brooklyn Times, where she was asked to cover the World Series despite her inexperience as a sports writer. The paper also asked her to cover local politics, prize fights, chess matches and Wall Street. She moved back to Arkansas during her first marriage, to artist Haile Hendrix, and had her first daughter, Joanne. She moved back to New York to take a job with the Universal News Service as a feature writer, keeping the position until 1937.

The same year, she married fellow reporter John Lewis, who she had met while covering the Mary Aster trial. The couple bought The Burlington Daily Enterprise in New Jersey, although the paper ultimately failed. They lived in Pound Ridge, New York, and although in 1940, Roe began working as the assistant women's editor for King Features Syndicate in Manhattan, she continued to commute. In 1941, she became a syndicated columnist and the women's editor for the Associated Press (AP), a position that she held for nineteen years. The same year, she gave birth to her second daughter, Judy. She focused on fashion writing, particularly comparing the fashions of post-World War II to those pre-war. Roe established a network of other fashion editors and met many well-known fashion designers. She was particularly close to milliner Lilly Daché, including editing her books Talking Through My Hats and Glamour Book. She also covered women's clubs and their work; one 1952 article focused on an attempt to resolve transit issues.

In December 1950, Roe contributed to the AP article "How Experts Think We’ll Live in 2000 A.D.", where she predicted what the typical woman would be like in the year 2000. She anticipated that women would be six feet tall, compete in men's sports such as football and wrestling and could even be president. During her career, Roe also served as a judge of the Penney-Missouri Awards. Roe and Lewis moved to Long Island in 1958. She was awarded the Missouri Honor Medal from the Missouri School of Journalism in 1959.

In 1960, Roe retired from the AP and started teaching at the University of Missouri School of Journalism. She also wrote a regular column for the Chicago Tribune-New York News Syndicate. She published a book, The Trouble With Women Is Men, in 1961. She retired from teaching in 1974 but continued to edit the Columbia Missourian until 1980. She continued to freelance until her death.

== Death and legacy ==
Roe died on March 24, 1985, at the age of 80. Her papers are held by the State Historical Society of Missouri. Her career at the AP was described by the journalist Dean Earl English as "a breakthrough for women in journalism. She was the most successful pioneer in the field of women's Page 4 news."

== Works ==
- Roe, Dorothy (1961). The Trouble with Women is Men. Prentice-Hall.
