= Pittsburgh Press Co. v. Pittsburgh Commission on Human Relations =

- Supreme Court of the United States

Argued March 20, 1973 Decided June 21, 1973
- Full case name: Pittsburgh Press Co. v. Pittsburgh Commission on Human Relations
- Citations: 413 U.S. 376 (more) 93 S. Ct. 2553; 37 L. Ed. 2d 669

Case history
- Prior: Pittsburgh Press Emp't Adver. Discrimination Appeal, 4 Pa. Commw. 448, 287 A.2d 161 (Commw. Ct. 1972)
- Subsequent: Rehearing denied, 414 U.S. 881 (1973).

Holding
- A Pittsburgh ordinance, as construed to forbid newspapers to carry sex-designated advertising columns for nonexempt job opportunities, does not violate petitioner's First Amendment rights

Court membership
- Chief Justice Warren E. Burger Associate Justices William O. Douglas · William J. Brennan Jr. Potter Stewart · Byron White; Thurgood Marshall · Harry Blackmun; Lewis F. Powell Jr. · William Rehnquist

Case opinions
- Majority: Powell, joined by Brennan, Marshall, Rehnquist, White
- Dissent: Burger
- Dissent: Douglas
- Dissent: Stewart, joined by Douglas
- Dissent: Blackmun

Pittsburgh Press Co. v. Pittsburgh Commission on Human Relations, 413 U.S. 376 (1973), is a 1973 decision of the United States Supreme Court which upheld an ordinance enacted in Pittsburgh that forbids sex-designated classified advertising for job opportunities, against a claim by the parent company of the Pittsburgh Press that the ordinance violated its First Amendment rights.

== Background ==
The case involved an ordinance passed after Wilma Scott Heide of the Pittsburgh chapter of the National Organization for Women filed a complaint with the Pittsburgh Commission on Human Relations, in which it argued that the practice of the Pittsburgh Press of advertising help wanted classified advertising under headings of "help wanted-male" and "help wanted-female" was discriminatory. Evidence from Gerald Gardner quantified the discriminatory nature of the advertising, showing that fewer jobs and ones with lower pay were being offered for women.

== Decision ==
In his majority decision, Associate Justice Lewis F. Powell ruled that help wanted ads were a form of commercial speech that is excluded from protections of freedom of speech and of the press offered under the First Amendment. Sex-segregated advertising was made illegal under the ordinance passed in Pittsburgh, and would be no more permissible than advertisements for prostitutes or drugs that would not be ameliorated by the fact that a newspaper advertised them under the headings "prostitutes wanted" or "narcotics for sale". In the same way, an advertiser who placed ads seeking male applicants "is likely to discriminate in his hiring decisions", and the newspaper should not be assisting even indirectly in this discriminatory practice by allowing such ads to be printed. Stewart emphasized that the court affirmed "the protection afforded to editorial judgment and to the free expression of views, however controversial" and that it was in no way restricting "stories or commentary by the Pittsburgh Press, its columnists or its contributors".

The dissenting justices raised issues regarding the dangerous precedent on government control of the press, with Associate Justice Potter Stewart describing the decision as "the first case in this or any other American court that permits a government agency to... dictate the publisher the layout and makeup of the newspaper's pages", expressing his fear that this would not be the last such case once the precedent has been set. After all, once standards on advertising had been set in this decision "what is there to prevent it from dictating the layout of the news pages tomorrow?" Chief Justice Warren Burger's dissent saw the decision setting "a treacherous path" in which the courts decide on "what is to be constitutionally unprotected and therefore subject to governmental regulation.
