= Hal Scott =

American journalist

Harold Dwight Scott (July 8, 1923 – September 21, 2010) was an American sportscaster. He worked primarily at Minneapolis's television station WCCO-TV in 1960s and 1970s. He also worked for CBS. He was the television voice for the Minnesota Vikings from 1965 to 1967 on CBS games. He was the brother of fellow sportscaster Ray Scott.
