= Aileen Hernandez =

American union organizer and civil rights activist

- Born: Aileen Blanche Clarke; May 23, 1926; New York City, U.S.
- Died: February 13, 2017 (aged 90); Tustin, California, U.S.
- Education: Howard University (BA); New York University; California State University, Los Angeles (MA)
- Occupations: Woman's rights activist union organizer president of the National Organization for Women (1970–1971)

Aileen Hernandez (née Clarke; May 23, 1926 – February 13, 2017) was an African-American union organizer, civil rights activist, and women's rights activist. She served as the president of the National Organization for Women (NOW) between 1970 and 1971, and was the first woman to serve on the Equal Employment Opportunity Commission.

Hernandez attended Howard University, where her interest in civil rights was cemented in an incident where she was told that she had to hail a "black" taxi. After graduating with honors, she became a labor union organizer before helping found NOW. As its second president, she helped organize the Women's Strike for Equality and testified in front of a congressional subcommittee on the Equal Rights Amendment, but she left the organization out of frustration with what she saw as its racial inequities. Hernandez would go on to co-found several organizations that focused on African-American women, along with teaching at several universities in California. She died in 2017 at the age of 90.

== Early life and education ==
Hernandez was born Aileen Blanche Clarke on May 23, 1926, in Brooklyn, New York, to Jamaican immigrants Charles Henry Clarke Sr., an art supply executive, and Ethel Louise Hall, a seamstress. As the only African-American family on their block in Bay Ridge, they were subjected to racial discrimination from their neighbors, something she would later point to as a reason for her interest in political activism. Hernandez was educated at the all-girls Bay Ridge High School in Brooklyn, graduating as the salutatorian of the class of 1943, and went on to attend Howard University. At Howard, she first intended to major in education and become a teacher, but her experience of segregation in the capital and climate at the campus induced her to change her plans. She instead earned a degree in sociology and political science in 1947, graduating magna cum laude. While pursuing her degree, Hernandez was a member of Alpha Kappa Alpha sorority and the college's chapter of the National Association for the Advancement of Colored People (NAACP).

Her interest in civil rights had been sustained by an experience she had in Washington, D.C., fresh off the train from New York to start at Howard. When she asked a station attendant for a way to the university, she was told to hail a "black" taxi cab. Unaware of prevailing social conventions in the city, she assumed that this referred to the color of the car. However, "this wasn't the issue," she later said in an interview with Makers. "If you wanted to go to Howard University," a traditionally African-American university, "no taxi driver who was white was going to take you."

After graduating from Howard, Hernandez traveled to Norway for International Student Exchange program classes at the University of Oslo. When she returned to the United States, Hernandez began graduate studies at New York University, but left for California in 1951 upon learning that the International Ladies Garment Workers Union (ILGWU) had an open place in their labor college, which aimed to train new labor leaders.

== Activism ==
Active as an organizer with the ILGWU, Hernandez eventually became the Education and Public Relations Director for the union's Pacific coast region. In 1960, she visited six South American countries under the auspices of the US State Department, where she gave lectures on the United States. A year later, Hernandez finished a master's degree in government from the California State University at Los Angeles, shortly before she officially left the union to work on the comptroller campaign of Alan Cranston. With his victory, she was appointed as the Deputy Chief of the California Division of Fair Employment Practices. As a result of her work in this position, she was appointed by Lyndon Johnson in 1964 as the only woman on the new Equal Employment Opportunity Commission. However, she resigned in 1966 after just eighteen months, having been frustrated at the commission's lack of speed in addressing cases that involved sexual discrimination.

Hernandez helped found the National Organization for Women (NOW), and was its second national president from 1970 to 1971, during which time it organized the Women's Strike for Equality. One of her goals in this position was to reshape what she called the "embarrassingly elitist and middle-class" image of the NOW, stating that "I'm much more interested in the problems of the mass woman than the professional ... The low-income woman isn't going to run to join NOW, but she's going to relate to our program because she has known for a long time the problems of combining a family with a job." In spring 1970, she testified in front of a congressional subcommittee on the Equal Rights Amendment. After resigning the presidency, she co-founded NOW's Minority Women's Task Force but became frustrated with what she saw as the organization's unwillingness to take on racial inequity, especially within NOW itself. She eventually left NOW in 1979 after white candidates were elected to every officer position for the second straight year.

Between founding NOW and serving as its second president, Hernandez co-founded Black Women Organized for Political Action in 1969. In 1984, Hernandez and Clara Stanton Jones founded the black women's discussion group Black Women Stirring the Waters in the San Francisco Bay Area.

Other accomplishments of Hernandez's included co-founding the National Women's Political Caucus, Black Women Organized for Political Action, and a publishing company with nine African-American women. She served as the co-chair of the National Urban Coalition and on the boards of or advisory committees of the American Civil Liberties Union (ACLU), the NAACP, and several other organizations, in addition to teaching within the University of California system and the University of San Francisco and founding an eponymous consulting firm.

== Personal life ==
While working as an organizer for the ILGWU in 1957, Aileen Hernandez married Alfonso Hernandez, a garment cutter. They divorced in 1961.

Hernandez donated 187 boxes of personal papers to the Sophia Smith Collection at Smith College in 2014.

== Death ==
Hernandez died on February 13, 2017, at the age of 90 from complications related to dementia. The ACLU's deputy director Dorothy Ehrlich, who had known Hernandez from the 1970s, noted that "Aileen Hernandez’s entire life embodied the movement forward for women and people of color, and her significant role in that history will never be forgotten." NOW's president Terry O'Neill wrote: "NOW's commitment to intersectional feminism is a direct legacy of Aileen Hernandez's unshakable belief in diversity and racial justice."

== Honors ==
- In 1989, the Northern California chapter of the ACLU gave Hernandez its civil liberties award for "decades of work for equality and justice."
- In 2004, Hernandez was awarded the Humanist Heroine Award by the American Humanist Association.
- In 2005, Hernandez was nominated for a Nobel Peace Prize along with some 1,000 women from 150 nations, so honored for their work in social justice and civil rights.

Non-profit organization positions
Preceded by Betty Friedan	President of the National Organization for Women; 1970–1971	Succeeded by Wilma Scott Heide
