= Ray Scott (sportscaster) =

American sportscaster (1919–1998)

- Born: Ray Eugene Scott; June 17, 1919; Johnstown, Pennsylvania, U.S.
- Died: March 23, 1998 (aged 78); Minneapolis, Minnesota, U.S.
- Occupation: Sportscaster
- Spouse(s): Bonnie Scott (2nd); Eda Scott (1st)
- Children: 5
- Relatives: Hal Scott (brother)

Ray Eugene Scott (June 17, 1919 – March 23, 1998) was an American sportscaster, best known for his broadcasts for the Green Bay Packers of the National Football League (NFL). His brother Hal Scott was also a sportscaster.

== Early life and career ==
A native of Johnstown, Pennsylvania, Scott began his broadcasting career on local radio in the late 1930s. (Fellow announcer Bill McColgan, in his introduction of Scott for the radio broadcast of the 1957 NFL Championship Game, stated that Scott started broadcasting when he was only 17 years old.) Following a stint in the U.S. Army during World War II, he moved to Pittsburgh, where he did play-by-play for Carnegie Tech and University of Pittsburgh football and Duquesne University basketball.

== Green Bay Packers and CBS Sports ==
Scott's first NFL broadcasts came in 1953 over the DuMont network; three years later he began doing play-by-play on Packers broadcasts for CBS,

Scott was paired primarily with Tony Canadeo on Packers telecasts. As the team's play-by-play announcer, Scott broadcast Super Bowl I and II for CBS, along with the brutally cold "Ice Bowl" NFL championship game of 1967. It was during this period that his terse, minimalist style (e.g. : "Starr . . . Dowler . . . Touchdown, Green Bay!") developed its greatest following. It also earned him a reputation as the "King of Understatement". Scott was also known for only occasionally using team names while broadcasting, more often identifying them by their city.

In 1968, CBS ended its practice of assigning dedicated announcing crews to particular teams. Scott became the play-by-play announcer on CBS' lead NFL broadcast team. He was partnered with Paul Christman in 1968 and 1969 and Pat Summerall from 1970 to 1973. During his tenure with CBS he called four Super Bowls, seven NFL (later NFC) championship games, and the 1961 Orange Bowl; he also called major college bowl games for ABC and NBC during this period.

== Baseball broadcasting ==
Scott was the lead television and radio announcer for Major League Baseball's Minnesota Twins from 1961 to 1966, calling the 1965 World Series on NBC television alongside Vin Scully, the voice of the Los Angeles Dodgers. Scott's famous minimalist style was evident in his call of Lou Johnson's home run that broke a scoreless tie and proved to be the game winner ("Kaat's pitch, uh-oh, it's a long fly down the left field line. Home run"). After Sandy Koufax struck out his tenth hitter for the final out of the series, Scott stated "every pitcher likes to end a game with a strikeout. But this was not just any game. It was the 7th game of the World Series." After leaving Minnesota he called games for the Washington Senators in 1970–71 before returning to the Twins as a part-time announcer in 1973–75. Scott also called Milwaukee Brewers telecasts in 1976–77.

== Later life and career ==
CBS dismissed Scott in 1974, replacing him with his color commentator, Summerall. He was subsequently employed as a local radio announcer by the Kansas City Chiefs (1974–75), Tampa Bay Buccaneers (1976–77), and Minnesota Vikings (1978–82). Scott also served as a narrator for the NFL Films Game of the Week in the 1970s and called play-by-play of Phoenix Suns basketball in 1974–75, syndicated broadcasts of Penn State football from 1975–81, the USFL's Arizona Wranglers in 1983 and 1984, and the Portland Breakers in the 1985 season. In 1988, Scott was one of several veteran announcers to call some September NFL telecasts for NBC, while many of the network's regular broadcasters were working at that year's Summer Olympics in Seoul.

Scott also called UCLA, Arizona, Arizona State, Minnesota, and Nebraska football in the '80s; broadcast college basketball and golf at various points in his career; and teamed with Patrick Ryan while doing high school and college football in and around Billings, Montana. From 1986 to 1988, he called the annual Peach Bowl game for the Mizlou Television Network; at the same time, he was a sportscaster at KTVK in Phoenix, having wintered in Arizona since 1968. In the later years of his life he hosted a syndicated talk show on the short-lived SportsAmerica Radio Network. In addition to sportscasting, Scott also read newscasts at WCCO-FM in Minneapolis in the late 1970s and early '80s. He also broadcast Saint John's University in Collegeville, Minnesota in the late 1980s and thru the 1990s.

=== Family & Personal life / Death ===
Scott died in 1998 at age 78 in Minneapolis following a long illness. He was survived by his second wife, Bonnie, and his first wife, Eda and their five children, including a son Patrick Scott, who resides in Ramsey County, Minnesota and broadcasts with Sheriff Bob Fletcher during their "Live On Patrol" podcast that streams on Facebook and YouTube each Friday night.

== Awards and honors ==
Scott was twice named National Sportscaster of the Year by the National Sportscasters and Sportswriters Association, was given regional awards by that organization 12 times in four different states, and was inducted into its Hall of Fame in 1982. Posthumous honors include induction into the American Sportscasters Association Hall of Fame in 1998, receipt of the Pete Rozelle Radio-Television Award from the Pro Football Hall of Fame in 2000, and induction into the Green Bay Packers Hall of Fame as a contributor in July 2001.

Scott was ranked 28th in the American Sportscasters Association's list of the Top 50 Sportscasters of All Time in 2009. His bare-bones style has inspired many sportscasters.

| Preceded by Jack Buck | NFL on CBS lead play-by-play announcer 1969–1973 | Succeeded by Pat Summerall |
| Preceded by First; Jack Buck | Super Bowl television play-by-play announcer (NFC package carrier); 1966 (with Jack Whitaker for the second half)-1967 1971–1973 | Succeeded by Jack Buck; Pat Summerall |
| Preceded by Harry Caray and Curt Gowdy (Games 1–2, 6–7); Phil Rizzuto and Joe Garagiola (Games 3–5) | World Series network television play-by-play announcer (with Vin Scully); 1965 | Succeeded by Curt Gowdy |
