= Bulk density =

Mass per unit volume of granular matter

In materials science, bulk density, also called apparent density, is a material property defined as the mass of the many particles of the material divided by the bulk volume. Bulk volume is defined as the total volume the particles occupy, including particle's own volume, inter-particle void volume, and the particles' internal pore volume.

Bulk density is useful for materials such as powders, granules, and other "divided" solids, especially used in reference to mineral components (soil, gravel), chemical substances, pharmaceutical ingredients, foodstuff, or any other masses of corpuscular or particulate matter (particles).

Bulk density is not the same as the particle density, which is an intrinsic property of the solid and does not include the volume for voids between particles (see: density of non-compact materials). Bulk density is an extrinsic property of a material; it can change depending on how the material is handled. For example, a powder poured into a cylinder will have a particular bulk density; if the cylinder is disturbed, the powder particles will move and usually settle closer together, resulting in a higher bulk density. For this reason, the bulk density of powders is usually reported both as "freely settled" (or "poured" density) and "tapped" density (where the tapped density refers to the bulk density of the powder after a specified compaction process, usually involving vibration of the container.)

== Soil ==
The bulk density of soil depends greatly on the mineral make up of soil and the degree of compaction. The density of quartz is around 2.65 g/cm^{3} but the (dry) bulk density of a mineral soil is normally about half that density, between 1.0 and 1.6 g/cm^{3}. In contrast, soils rich in soil organic carbon and some friable clays tend to have lower bulk densities (<1.0 g/cm^{3}) due to a combination of the low-density of the organic materials themselves and increased porosity. For instance, peat soils have bulk densities from 0.02 to 0.98 g/cm^{3}. In a detailed study which has used 6,000 analysed samples in the European Union, a high resolution map (100m) of soil bulk density for the 0-20cm using regression model. Croplands have almost 1.5 times higher bulk density compared to woodlands.

Bulk density of soil is usually determined from a core sample which is taken by driving a metal corer into the soil at the desired depth and horizon. This gives a soil sample of known total volume, V_{t}. From this sample the wet bulk density and the dry bulk density can be determined.

For the wet bulk density (total bulk density) this sample is weighed, giving the mass M_{t}. For the dry bulk density, the sample is oven dried and weighed, giving the mass of soil solids, M_{s}. The relationship between these two masses is M_{t} = M_{s} + M_{l}, where M_{l} is the mass of substances lost on oven drying (often, mostly water). The dry and wet bulk densities are calculated as

Dry bulk density = mass of soil/ volume as a whole

$$\rho_b = \frac{M_s}{V_t}$$

Wet bulk density = mass of soil plus liquids/ volume as a whole

$$\rho_t = \frac{M_t}{V_t}$$

The dry bulk density of a soil is inversely related to the porosity of the same soil: the more pore space in a soil the lower the value for bulk density. Bulk density of a region in the interior of the Earth is also related to the seismic velocity of waves travelling through it: for P-waves, this has been quantified with Gardner's relation. The higher the density, the faster the velocity.

== See also ==
- Brazil nut effect
- Characterisation of pore space in soil
- Effective porosity
- Density meter
- Number density
