= Rona M. Fields =

American psychologist, author

- Born: 27 October 1932
- Died: April 2, 2016 (aged 83)
- Education: Lake Forest College; Loyola University Chicago; University of Southern California
- Occupations: Psychologist, feminist and author

Rona Marcia Fields (née Katz; 27 October 1932 – 2 April 2016) was an American psychologist, feminist and author, specialising in post-colonial studies and child psychology.

== Biography ==
Rona Katz was born into a Jewish American family in 1932 and attended Spalding High School for Crippled Children in Chicago. She studied for her undergraduate degree at Lake Forest College; masters at Loyola University Chicago; and Ph.D. at the University of Southern California. In the 1970s, she studied the effects of The Troubles on civilians, accusing the British state of psychological genocide against the Irish people.

In 1972, Fields was hired by Clark University, Massachusetts as a full-time associate professor. After being denied tenure in 1976, Fields filed charges with the Equal Employment Opportunity Commission and Massachusetts Commission Against Discrimination, alleging sexual harassment and that an associate professor who had just been awarded tenure made sexual advances toward her, and when she rejected them, he warned that her refusal "was no way to get tenure." The resulting case, Fields v. Clark University, resulted in her being reinstated for a two-year probationary period and then reconsidered for tenure, and awarded back pay, attorney's fees, and costs.

Fields later taught at San Fernando Valley State College, Howard University, George Mason University and George Washington University.

== Personal life ==
Rona Katz married Armond Fields in 1963. She was later married to Charles Fox, a psychology and sociology professor. She had three children.

== Bibliography ==
- A society on the run: A psychology of Northern Ireland (1973)
- The Women of Ireland: A Case Study in the Effects of 800 Years of Colonial Victimization (1974)
- The Portuguese Revolution and the Armed Forces Movement (1976)
- Society Under Siege: A Psychology of Northern Ireland (1977; also published as Northern Ireland: Society Under Siege)
- The Future of Women (1985)
- Martyrdom: The Psychology, Theology, and Politics of Self-Sacrifice (2004)
- Against Violence Against Women: The Case for Gender as a Protected Class (2013)
