= The Pittsburgh Press =

Newspaper published in Pittsburgh, Pennsylvania

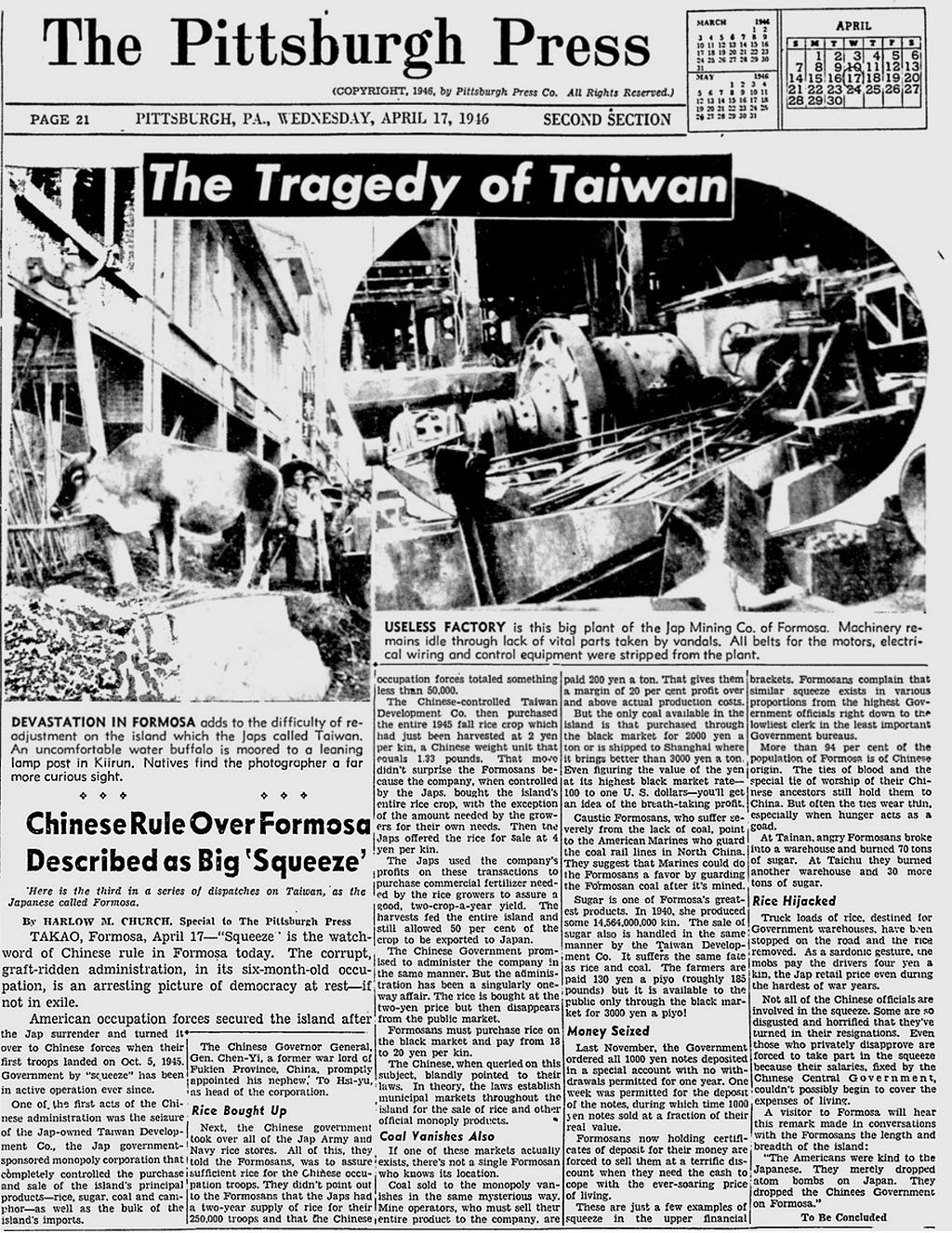
- The front page of the April 17, 1946 edition
- Type: Afternoon Daily newspaper (historical); Afternoon Daily online newspaper
- Format: Broadsheet
- Owner(s): E. W. Scripps Company (1923–1992); Block Communications (2011–2015)
- Founded: June 23, 1884
- Ceased publication: July 28, 1992 (in print)
- Relaunched: November 14, 2011–September 25, 2015
- Language: English
- Headquarters: Pittsburgh, Pennsylvania, U.S.
- OCLC number: 2266185
- Website: press.post-gazette.com

The Pittsburgh Press, formerly The Pittsburg Press and originally The Evening Penny Press, was a major afternoon daily newspaper published in Pittsburgh, Pennsylvania, for over a century, from 1884 to 1992. At the height of its popularity, the Press was the second-largest newspaper in Pennsylvania behind The Philadelphia Inquirer. For four years starting in 2011, the brand was revived and applied to an afternoon online edition of the Pittsburgh Post-Gazette.

== History ==
=== 19th century ===
The history of the Press traces back to an effort by Thomas J. Keenan Jr. to buy The Pittsburg Times newspaper, at which he was employed as city editor. Joining Keenan in his endeavor were reporter John S. Ritenour of the Pittsburgh Post, Charles W. Houston of the city clerk's office, and U.S. Representative Thomas M. Bayne.

After examining the Times and finding it in a poor state, the group changed course and decided to start a new penny paper in hopes that it would flourish in a local market full of two- and three-cent dailies. The first issue appeared on June 23, 1884.

A corporation was formed, with Bayne as the largest shareholder. Initially called The Evening Penny Press, the newspaper's name changed to The Pittsburg Press on October 19, 1887. The paper referred to the city as "Pittsburg" until August 1921, when the letter 'h' was added.

=== 20th century ===
Pittsburgh newspaper consolidation timeline

In 1901, Keenan, who had by then gained financial and editorial control of the paper, sold out to a syndicate led by Oliver S. Hershman. Hershman remained the controlling owner until selling to the Scripps-Howard chain in 1923.

In 1961, the Press entered into a Joint Operating Agreement (JOA) with the competing Pittsburgh Post-Gazette. The Post-Gazette had previously purchased and merged with the Hearst Corporation's Pittsburgh Sun-Telegraph leaving just itself and the much larger Pittsburgh Press. The agreement was to be managed by the owners of the Pittsburgh Press, E. W. Scripps Company, since the Press had the larger circulation and brand identity. Under the agreement, the Post-Gazette became a six-day morning paper, and the Pittsburgh Press became a six-day afternoon paper in addition to publishing the only Sunday newspaper in Pittsburgh.

Pittsburgh Press Co. v. Pittsburgh Commission on Human Relations, 413 U.S. 376 (1973), is a 1973 decision of the United States Supreme Court which upheld an ordinance enacted in Pittsburgh that forbids sex-designated classified advertising for job opportunities, against a claim by the parent company of the Press that the ordinance violated its First Amendment rights.

On October 22, 1991, Press management announced significant changes, designed to modernize its distribution system, at the initial bargaining with the Teamsters Local 211 union, as well as eight other unions. The unions' contracts with the Press expired on December 31. Negotiations continued into 1992 with no agreement on a new contract. The Teamsters employees finally walked off the job on May 17, effectively putting a halt to the publication of the Press and the Post-Gazette. The Teamsters refused to drive the small delivery trucks more than half full.

In the press room, a union featherbedding provision under which its members had to set up every ad that appeared in the newspaper, even if it ran years before; in the case of advertisements prepared by outside print shops, those ads were still set up in the type used by the Press, and then dismantled. The backlog of such advertisements grew to several years long. With the increasing rise of electronic media, and more younger readers not reading newspapers, the Press could no longer sustain the union practices of the past. The unions would not budge and did not believe that the previous business model could no longer be sustained and afforded. A short sound bite on national TV by the then-mayor supporting the unions was the death knell, and Scripps-Howard consequently ended the newspaper. All the union jobs were lost, as were the jobs of over 100 non-union employees of the newspaper.

An attempt by both papers to resume distribution, with replacement drivers, began with the July 27 issues of both papers and lasted two days until they halted publication again due to resistance from the public and civic leaders. The second day, July 28, marked the final edition of the Press.

After months of failed negotiations, Scripps put the Pittsburgh Press up for sale on October 2, 1992. Block Communications, the owners of the much smaller JOA paper, the Post-Gazette, agreed to purchase the paper, effective November 30, upon the settlement of the strike. The first issue of the newly combined Pittsburgh Post-Gazette, the first in nearly six months, was published on January 18, 1993, as a single combined newspaper incorporating many features and personnel from the Press, which would no longer be published. The loss of the Pittsburgh Press came as a shock to many Pittsburghers, who expected the larger paper to survive the strike.

In return for the sale of the Press, Scripps received The Monterey County Herald. The sale required a ruling by the U.S. Department of Justice as the Newspaper Preservation Act of 1970 regulated the JOA.

=== 21st century ===
On November 14, 2011, Block Communications announced that it was bringing back the Press in an online-only edition for the afternoon, effective immediately. David Shribman, the executive editor of the Post-Gazette, explained his paper's motivation for reviving the Press name, citing the fact that his newspaper still received letters to the editor addressed to the Press instead of the Post-Gazette, and that despite nearly 20 years since its last publication Pittsburgh natives still talked about the Press regularly.

Although published electronically, the new Press was formatted with a fixed layout replicating that of a traditional printed newspaper, and its font and layout were similar to the original print version of the Press. The experiment ended with the issue of September 25, 2015. Scripps—by this point having divested its newspaper operations to Gannett—would eventually return to the Pittsburgh market in 2021 when it acquired local Ion Television station WINP-TV as part of its larger acquisition of Ion Media.

== See also ==
- List of defunct newspapers of the United States
- Pittsburgh Post-Gazette, current owner of the "Press" name and present-day heir to its archives.
- Pittsburgh Press Co. v. Pittsburgh Commission on Human Relations
