= Betty Ford =

First Lady of the United States from 1974 to 1977

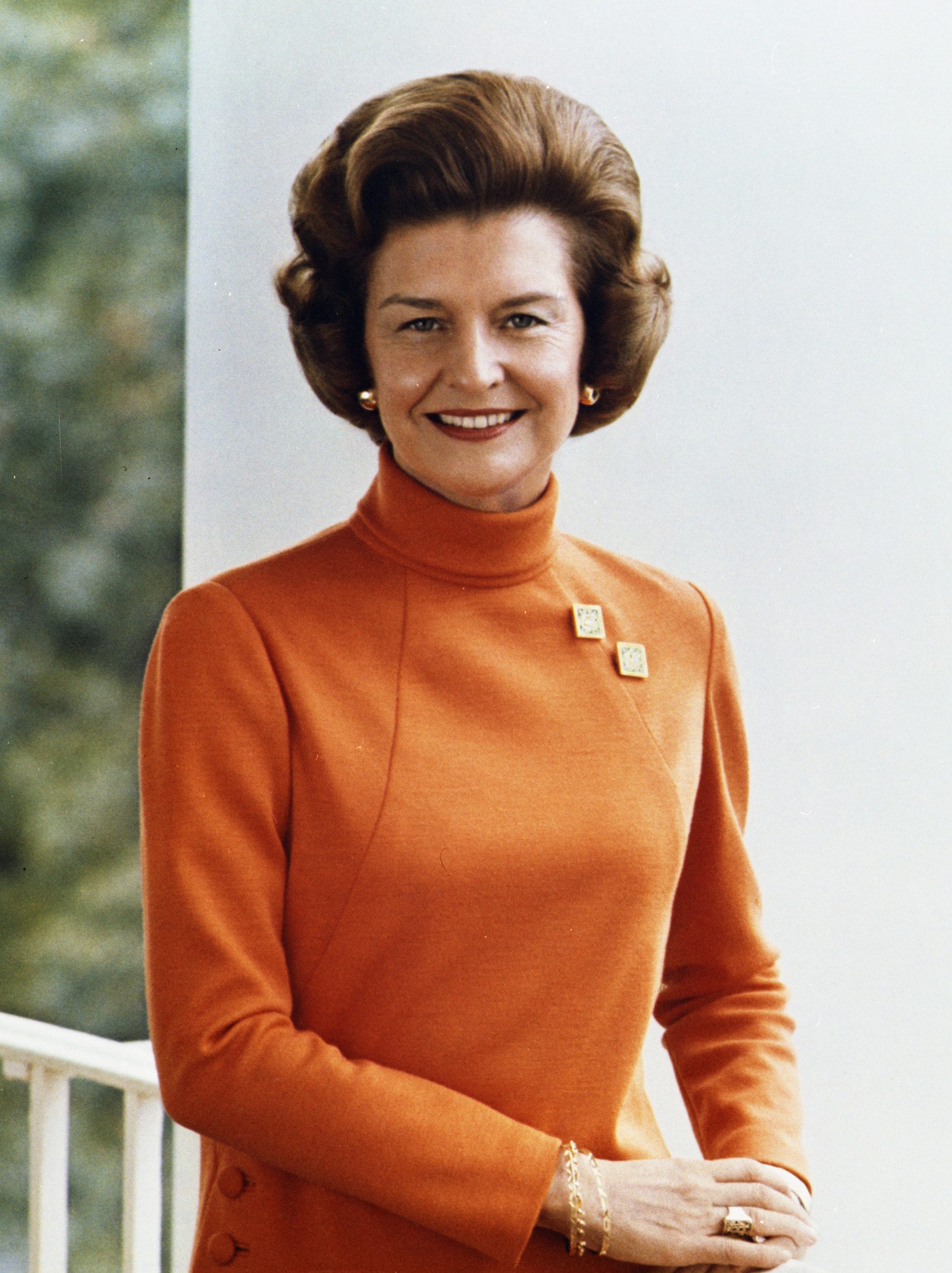
- Official portrait, 1974

First Lady of the United States
- In role August 9, 1974 – January 20, 1977
- President: Gerald Ford
- Preceded by: Pat Nixon
- Succeeded by: Rosalynn Carter

Second Lady of the United States
- In role December 6, 1973 – August 9, 1974
- Vice President: Gerald Ford
- Preceded by: Judy Agnew
- Succeeded by: Happy Rockefeller

1st Chairwoman of the Betty Ford Center
- In office October 4, 1982 – January 25, 2005
- Preceded by: Position established
- Succeeded by: Susan Ford Bales

Personal details
- Born: Elizabeth Anne Bloomer; April 8, 1918 Chicago, Illinois, U.S.
- Died: July 8, 2011 (aged 93) Rancho Mirage, California, U.S.
- Resting place: Gerald R. Ford Presidential Museum
- Party: Republican
- Spouses: William Cornelius "Bill" Warren (m. 1942; div. 1947) Gerald Ford (m. 1948; died 2006)
- Children: 4, including Steven and Susan

Elizabeth Anne Ford (née Bloomer; formerly Warren; April 8, 1918 – July 8, 2011) was First Lady of the United States from 1974 to 1977, as the wife of President Gerald Ford. As first lady, she was active in social policy, and set a precedent as a politically active presidential spouse. She was also Second Lady of the United States from 1973 to 1974, when her husband was vice president.

Throughout her husband's time in the office of the presidency, she maintained high approval ratings, and was considered to be an influential first lady. Ford was noted for raising breast cancer awareness following her 1974 mastectomy. In addition, she was a passionate supporter of the Equal Rights Amendment (ERA). As a supporter of abortion rights, and a leader in the women's rights movement, she gained fame as one of the most candid first ladies in history, commenting on the hot-button issues of the time, such as feminism, equal pay, the Equal Rights Amendment, sex, drugs, and abortion. Decennial surveys conducted by Siena College Research Institute of historians' assessments of American first ladies have consistently placed Ford in the top nine, with historians giving her especially high marks for her courage.

Following her years in the White House, Ford continued to lobby for the ERA, and remained active in the feminist movement. Soon after leaving office, she raised awareness of addiction when she sought help for, and publicly disclosed, her long-running struggle with alcoholism and substance abuse. After recovering, she founded and served as the first board chair of the Betty Ford Center, which provides treatment services for people with substance use disorders. Ford also became involved in causes related to HIV/AIDS. For years after leaving the White House, Ford continued to enjoy great influence and popularity, continuing to rank in the top ten of Gallup's annual most admired woman poll every year through 1991.

Ford was awarded the Presidential Medal of Freedom by George H. W. Bush in 1991. She was also awarded the Congressional Gold Medal as a co-recipient with President Ford in 1998.

== Early life and career ==
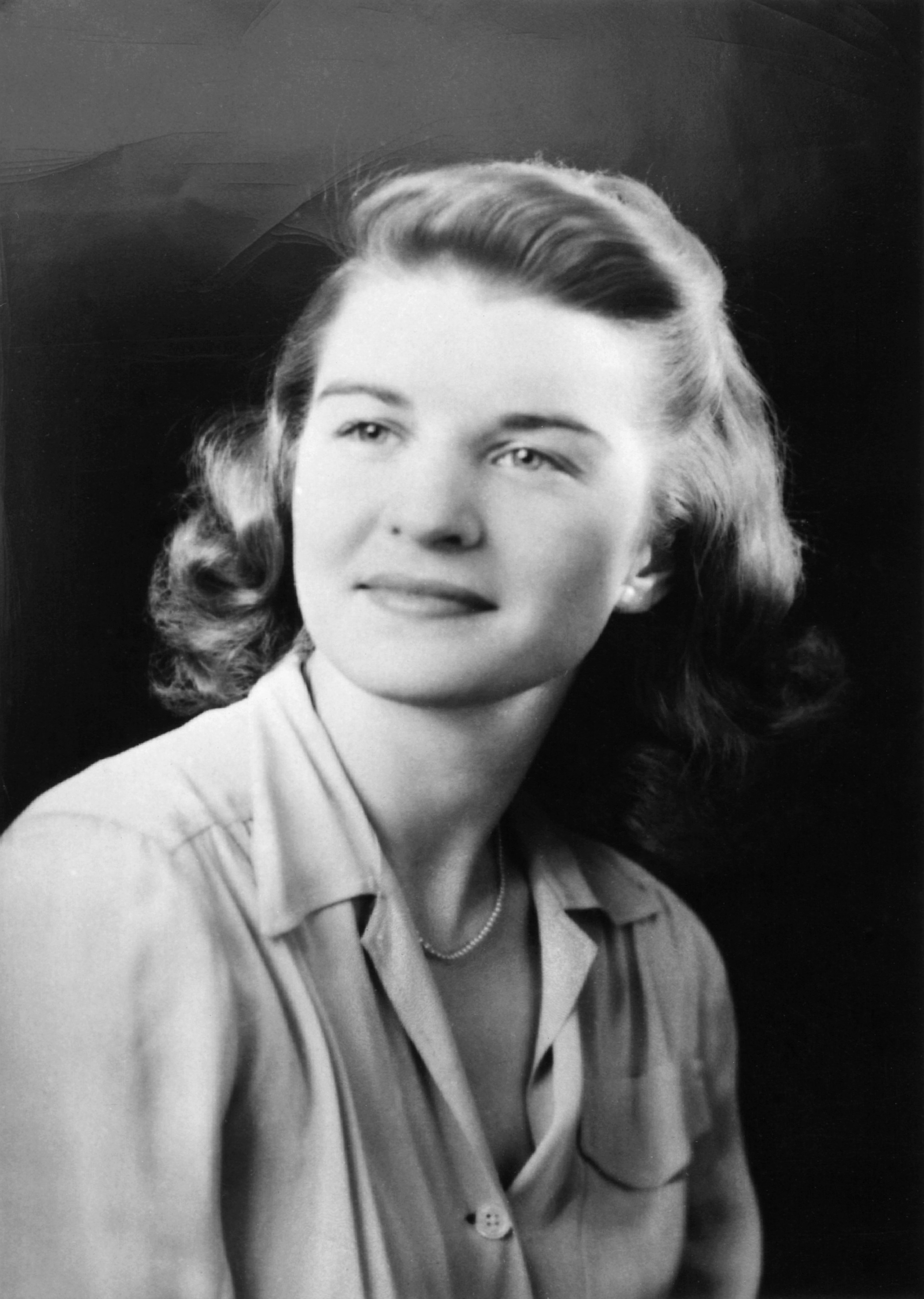
Bloomer in 1936; at age 18

Betty Ford was born Elizabeth Anne Bloomer on April 8, 1918, in Chicago, Illinois, the third-born child and the only daughter of Hortense (née Neahr; 1884–1948) and William Stephenson Bloomer Sr. (1874–1934), who was a travelling salesman for Royal Rubber Co. Hortense and William married on November 9, 1904, in Chicago. Betty's two older brothers were Robert (d. 1971) and William Jr. After the family lived briefly in Denver, Colorado, she grew up in Grand Rapids, Michigan, where she graduated from Central High School. As a child in Grand Rapids, she began to be referred to by the nickname Betty.

In 1926, when Bloomer was eight years old, her mother, who valued social graces, enrolled her in the Calla Travis Dance Studio in Grand Rapids, where Ford was taught ballet, tap dancing, and modern movement. She developed a passion for dance, and she decided she wanted to pursue a career in the field. At the age of 14, she began modeling clothes and teaching children popular dances, such as the foxtrot, waltz, and big apple, to earn money in the wake of the Great Depression. She worked with children with disabilities at the Mary Free Bed Home for Crippled Children. She studied dance at the Calla Travis Dance Studio, graduating in 1935. While she was still in high school, she started her own dance school, instructing both youth and adults.

Growing up, she was subject to teasing about her surname, with other kids in school calling her "Betty Pants" (a play on "bloomers" being a name for a type of lower-body garment). Bloomer disliked the surname.

When Ford herself began the process of recovering from her own alcoholism, she disclosed to the public that both her father and her brother Bob had suffered from alcoholism as well.

When Bloomer was 16, her father died of carbon monoxide poisoning in the family's garage; he died while working under their car, despite the garage doors being open. His death had been on the eve of his 60th birthday. There was never public disclosure given as to whether his circumstances of death had been accidental or an act of suicide. With her father's death, her family lost its primary breadwinner, which forced her mother to find work as a real estate agent in order to support the family. Her mother's actions in the wake of her father's death are said to have been formative for her views in support of equal pay and gender equality.

In 1936, after graduating from high school, Bloomer proposed continuing her study of dance in New York City, but her mother refused on account of the relatively recent loss of her husband. She instead attended the Bennington School of Dance in Bennington, Vermont, for two summers, where she studied under director Martha Hill with choreographers Martha Graham and Hanya Holm. After being accepted by Graham as a student in 1940, Bloomer moved to New York to live in Manhattan's Chelsea neighborhood; she worked as a fashion model for the John Robert Powers firm in order to finance her dance studies. She joined Graham's auxiliary troupe and eventually performed with the company at Carnegie Hall in New York City.

Bloomer's mother was opposed to her pursuing a career in dance and insisted that she return home, and, as a compromise, they agreed that Bloomer would return home for six months and, if she still wanted to return to New York City at the end of that time, her mother would not protest further. Bloomer became immersed in her life in Grand Rapids and did not return to New York. Her mother remarried, to family friend and neighbor Arthur Meigs Godwin, and Bloomer lived with them. She got a job as assistant to the fashion coordinator for Herpolsheimer's, a local department store. She also organized her own dance group and taught dance at various sites in Grand Rapids, including the Calla Travis Dance Studio. She further taught ballroom dancing lessons for children with visual impairment and hearing loss and gave weekly dance lessons to African American children.

=== Marriage to William Cornelius "Bill" Warren ===
In 1942, Elizabeth Bloomer married William Cornelius "Bill" Warren (1915–1989), whom she had known since she was 12. At the time they married, Warren worked for his own father in insurance sales. Shortly after they married, he began to sell insurance for another company. He later worked for the Continental Can Company, and after that for the Widdicomb Furniture Company. The couple moved frequently because of his work. At one point, they lived in Maumee, Ohio, where Elizabeth was employed at the nearby Toledo department store Lasalle & Koch as a demonstrator, a job that entailed being a model and saleswoman. She worked a production line for a frozen food company in Fulton, New York. When they returned to Grand Rapids, she worked again at Herpolsheimer's, this time as the fashion coordinator. She had, three years into the marriage, concluded that their relationship was a failure. She desired to have a family with children and was unhappy with the frequent moves between cities she had experienced in her marriage. Warren was an alcoholic and diabetic, and was in poor health. Shortly after she decided to file for divorce, Warren fell into a coma. She paused her divorce, and supported him, living at Warren's family's home for the next two years as his health recovered. During these two years, she lived upstairs while he was nursed downstairs. She worked jobs in order to support both herself and Warren. This experience has been credited with further cementing Ford's understanding of gender-based income inequalities between individuals doing the same work. After he recovered, they were divorced on September 22, 1947.

=== Marriage to Gerald Ford and motherhood ===
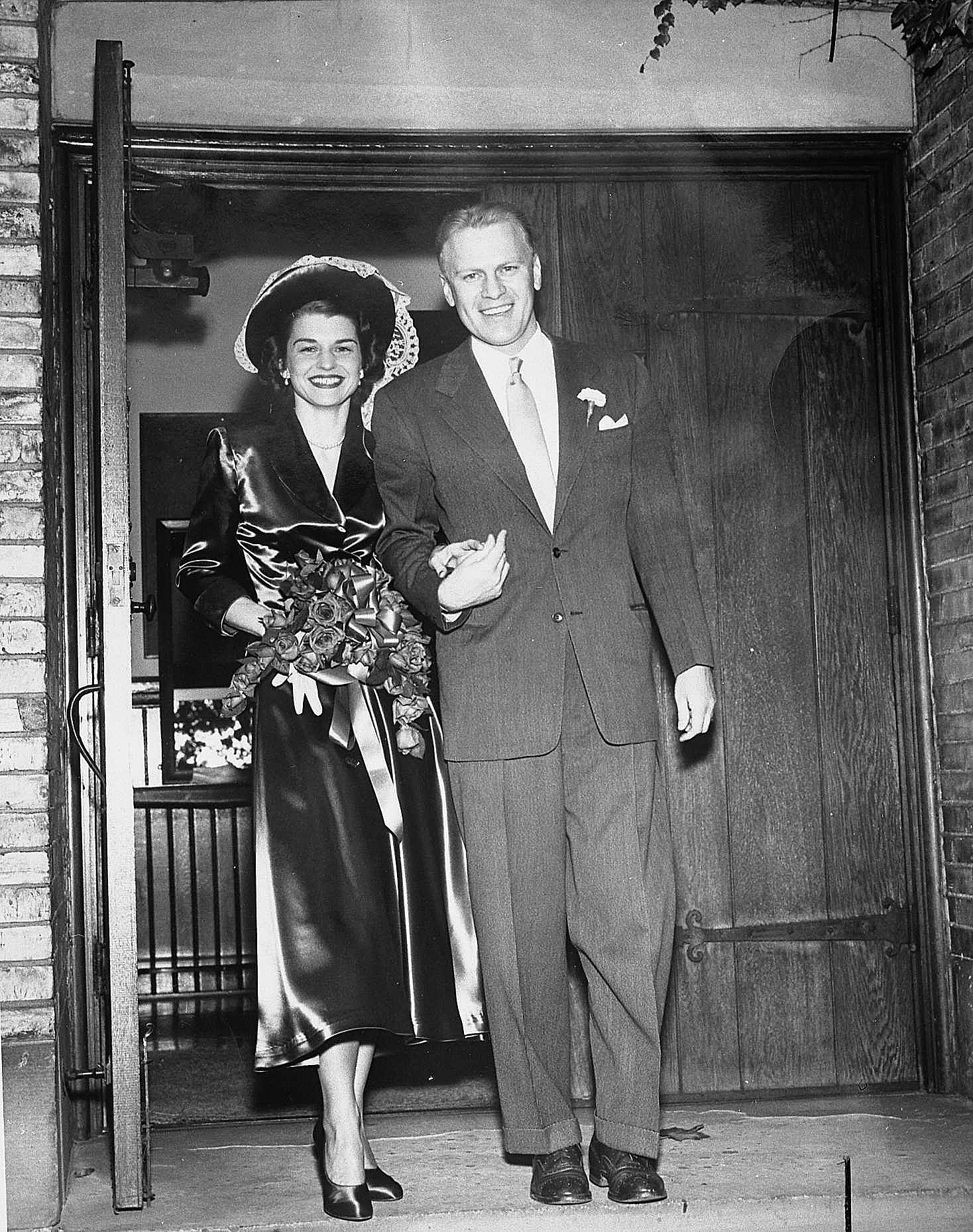
Betty and Gerald Ford on their wedding day, 1948

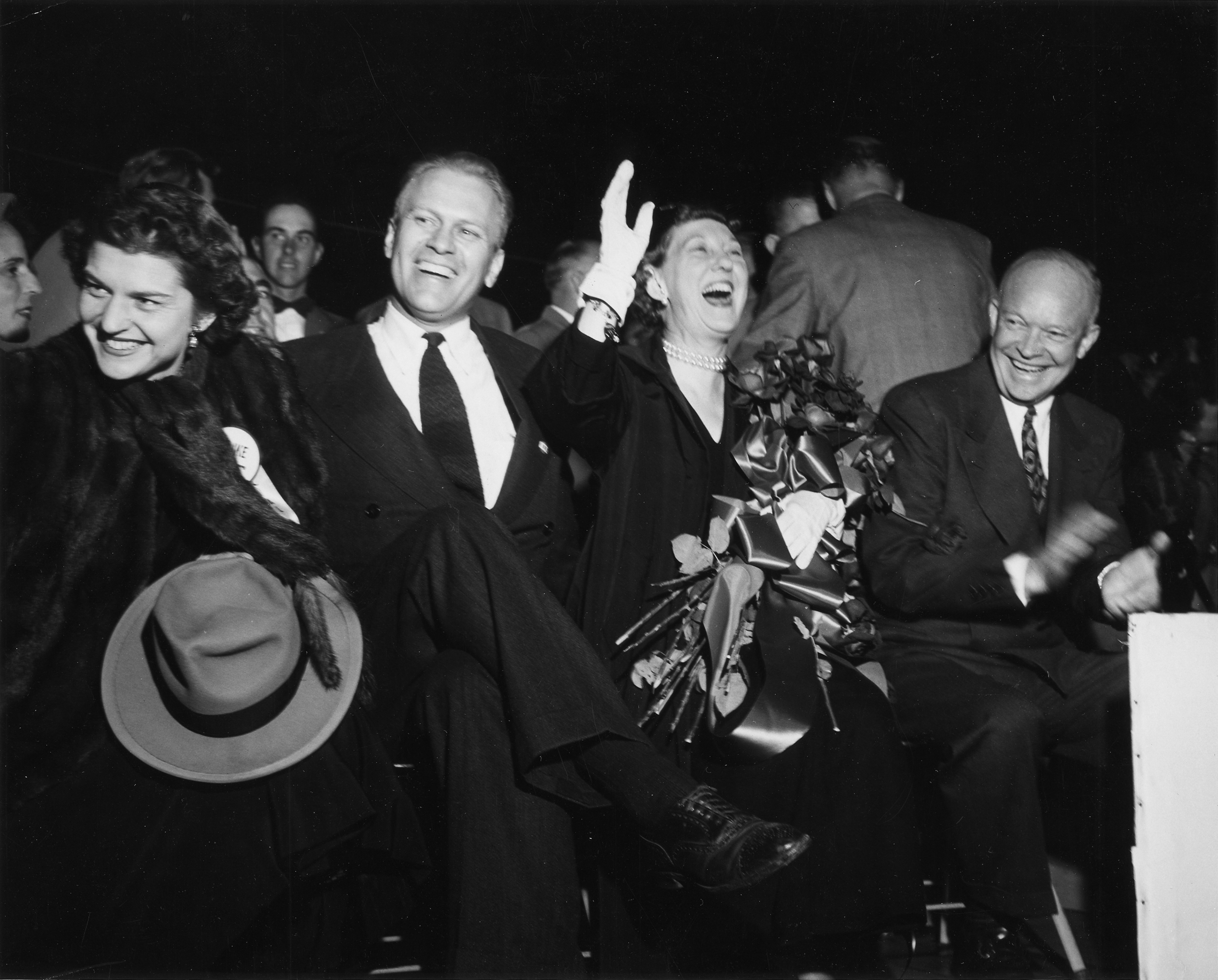
Betty and Gerald Ford join Dwight D. Eisenhower and his wife Mamie Eisenhower at a Grand Rapids, Michigan, event for Dwight D. Eisenhower's 1952 presidential campaign.

In August 1947, Ford was introduced by mutual friends to Gerald Ford, a lawyer and World War II veteran who had just resumed his legal practice after returning from Navy service, and was planning to run for the United States House of Representatives. She learned of Gerald's ambitions for political office during their engagement, when he launched his congressional campaign. They married on October 15, 1948, at Grace Episcopal Church in Grand Rapids. Gerald Ford was in the middle of his campaign. In the first of adjustments made by Betty for Gerald's political ambitions, she agreed to his request that they to delay their wedding until shortly before the primary election because, as The New York Times reported, "Jerry was running for Congress and wasn't sure how voters might feel about his marrying a divorced ex-dancer." For their honeymoon, the two briefly traveled to Ann Arbor, Michigan, where they attended a college football game between the Michigan Wolverines and the Northwestern Wildcats, before driving to Owosso, Michigan, to attend a campaign rally for Republican presidential nominee Thomas Dewey. The Fords would ultimately be married for the next 58 years, until Gerald Ford's death. An anecdote that was later reported was that, when Gerald Ford left Grand Rapids for Washington, D.C., Betty Ford's new sister-in-law Janet Ford remarked to her, "with Jerry, you'll never have to worry about other women. Your cross will be his work."

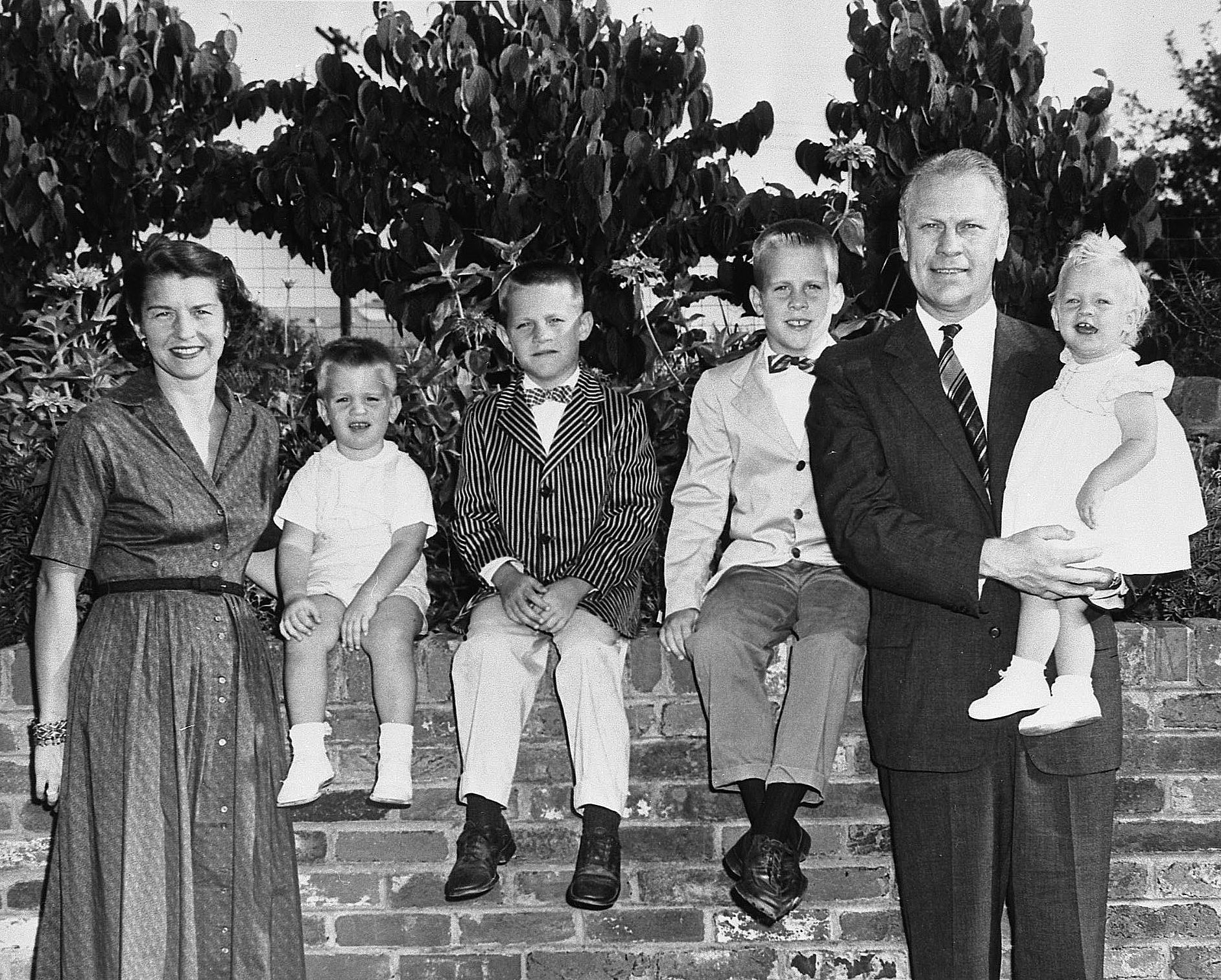
The Fords with their children in 1959

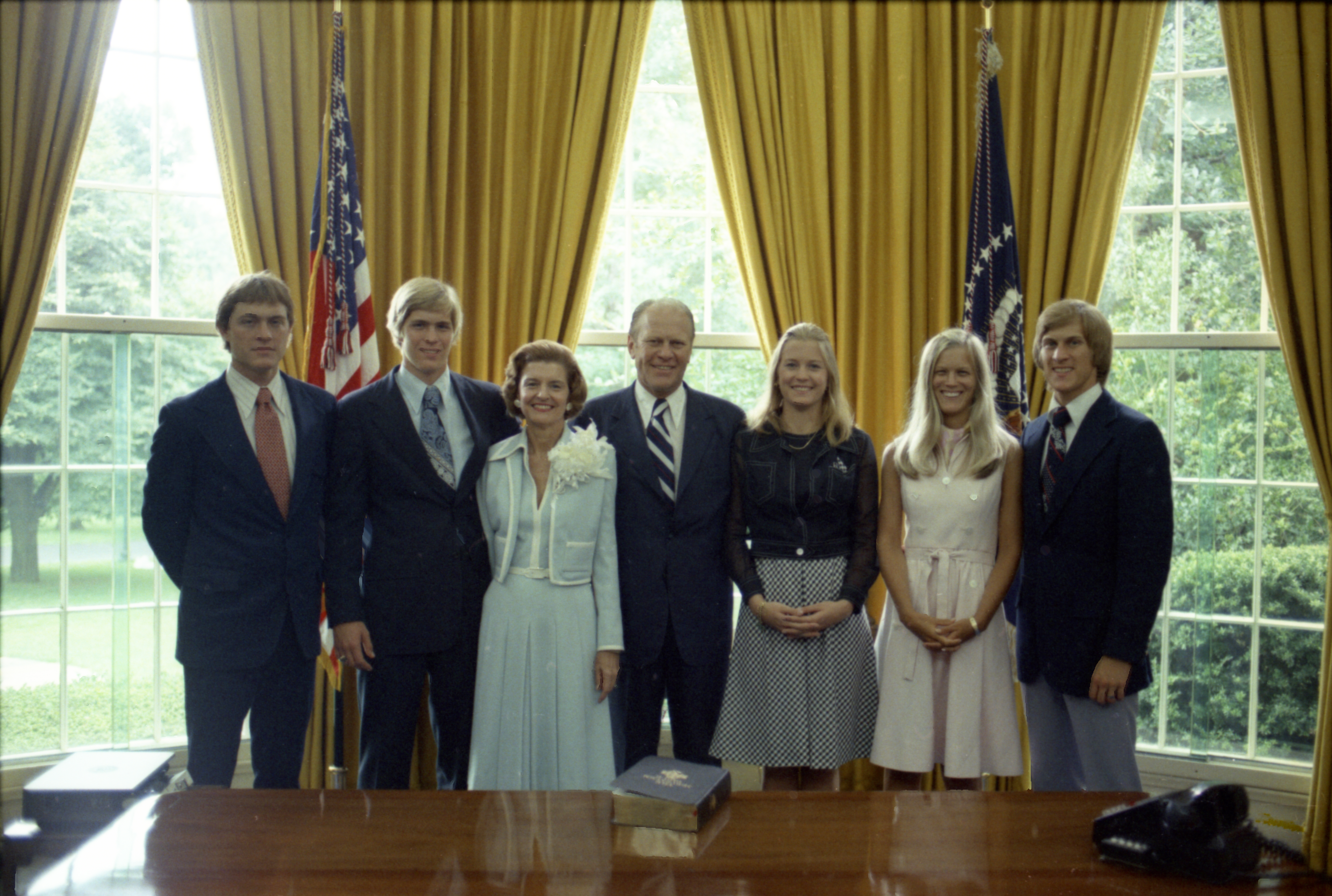
Ford (third from left) and her family in the Oval Office of the White House in 1974

Betty and Gerald Ford had four children together: Michael Gerald Ford (born 1950), John Gardner Ford (nicknamed Jack; born 1952), Steven Meigs Ford (born 1956), and Susan Elizabeth Ford (born 1957).

The Fords lived in Washington, D.C. after Gerald's election, until the spring of 1955, when the Fords moved into a house they constructed in the D.C. suburb of Alexandria, Virginia. Gerald Ford had ambitions to rise to the rank of speaker of the house, and therefore maintained a busy travel schedule, regularly crisscrossing the United States to fundraise and campaign on behalf of other Republicans in hopes that they would, in turn, provide him with the support he would eventually need to become speaker. This meant that Gerald Ford was away from home for roughly half the year, placing a great burden on Ford to raise their children. As a mother, Ford never spanked or hit her children, believing that there were better, more constructive ways to deal with discipline and punishment.

Ford involved herself in her children's activities, serving as a parent-teacher association member, a Sunday school teacher at Immanuel Church-on-the-Hill, and a Cub Scout "den mother". She regularly drove her children around to their activities, including her sons' Little League Baseball games and her daughter's dance classes. At the same time, she also involved herself in her husband's political career. Ford fulfilled the commitments expected of congressional spouses, which helped to elevate her husband's regard among his House colleagues. She accompanied her husband to congressional and White House events, as well as on some trips abroad. She also made herself available to newspaper and magazines for articles profiling her as a congressional spouse, and posed for newspaper publicity photographs. She also volunteered to model clothing for charity fashion shows, after a Republican figure had recruited her to do so after observing that Democratic Party spouses had far outnumbered Republican spouses as model at those publicity-generating events. She also volunteered for local charitable organizations, including serving as the program director of the Alexandria Cancer Fund Drive. She also maintained active membership in groups such as the 81st Congress Club and National Federation of Republican Women.

Ford's busy life took a toll. In 1964, a pinched nerve on the left side of Ford's neck sent her to the hospital for two weeks. After her pinched nerve, she began suffering several effects, including muscle spasms, peripheral neuropathy, numbing the left side of her neck, and arthritis on her shoulder and arm. She would be given prescription medication, including Valium. Ford would ultimately develop an addiction to prescription medication (and would ultimately confront and recover from this addiction in 1978). Ford's health problems and the stress of her husband's career (which saw him frequently away from their household) compounded, particularly after her husband's career became even more demanding after he became House minority leader in January 1965. In 1965, Ford suffered a significant nervous breakdown, erupting in severe crying that had appeared inexplicable to others. This led her to seek psychiatric assistance. Ford had weekly meetings with a psychiatrist approximately between August 1965 and April 1967. Ford received support from her family and managed to resume a busy lifestyle. However, notably, Ford had not yet managed to address her increasing prescription pain medication dependency, which sometimes saw her taking as many as twenty pills in a single day. Nor had she yet addressed her relationship with alcohol, which she, at the time, believed was typical consumption.

Ford accompanied her husband on a trip to mainland China in 1972. That same year, her husband brought up the possibility that he might retire from congress in 1977, which would make the 1974 United States House of Representatives election the last he would run in. This prospect elated Ford. Such talk was due to her husband seeing it as unlikely that he would ever fulfill his ambition of becoming speaker of the House in light of the Republican Party's failure to win a majority in the 1972 United States House of Representatives elections.

== Second Lady of the United States (1973–1974) ==
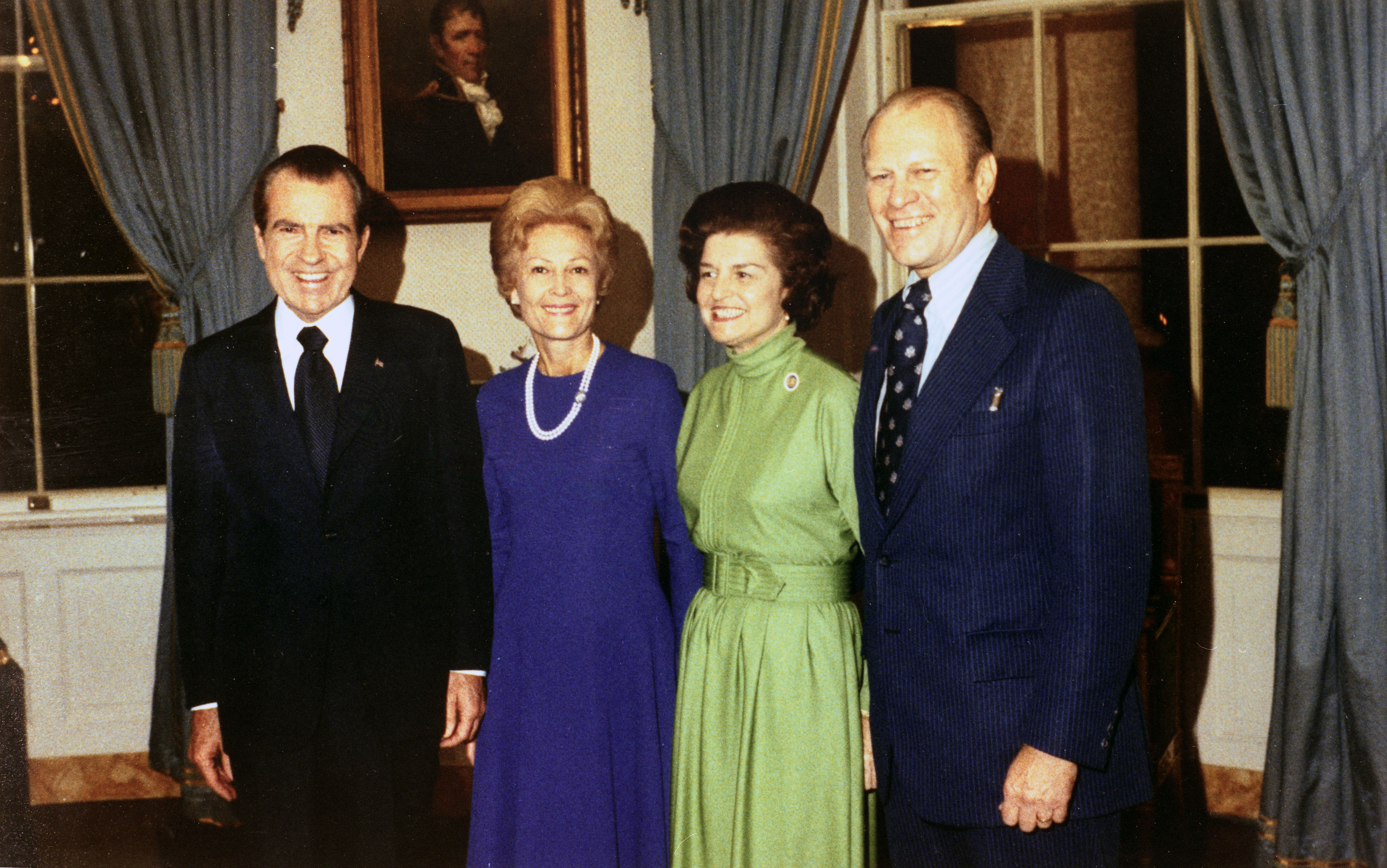
The Fords pose with President Richard Nixon and First Lady Pat Nixon on October 13, 1973, the day after President Nixon nominated Ford to be appointed as his new vice president.

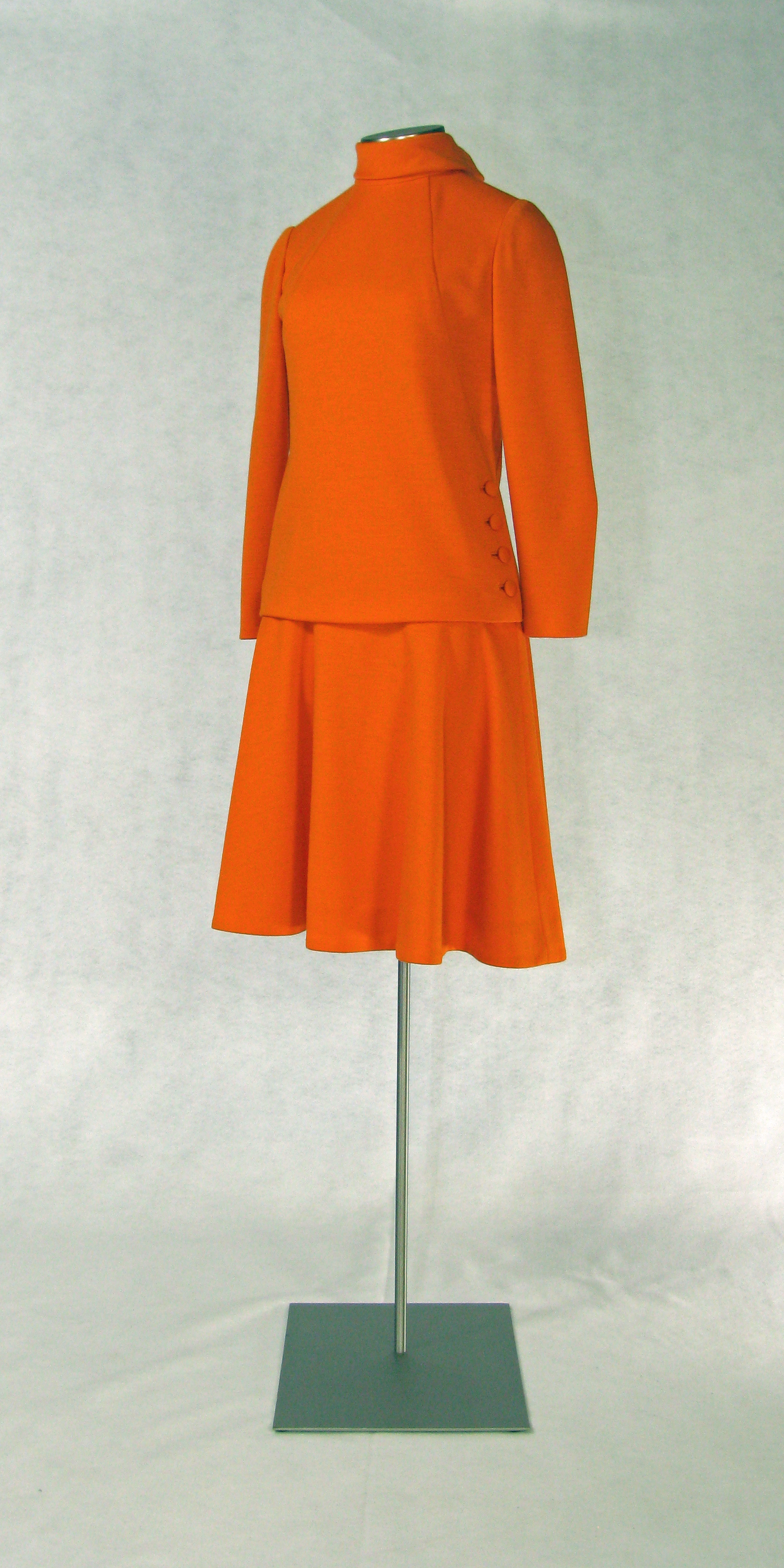
The Frankie Welch-designed dress that Ford wore to her husband's swearing-in as vice president

Spiro Agnew resigned as vice president on October 10, 1973. Two days later, on October 12, 1973, President Richard Nixon nominated Gerald Ford to serve as vice president. Ford felt an obligation to attend her husband's testimony at his confirmation hearings. During his testimony, Gerald Ford was questioned about attending psychiatric care. After this, Betty Ford was transparent with the news media that she had received psychiatric care. She explained that, while her husband had gone to two sessions with a psychiatric doctor, those sessions were for her care, and not care of his own. Gerald Ford was confirmed as vice president by the United States Congress on December 6, 1973, and he took the oath of office before a joint session of the United States Congress while placing his hand upon a bible held by Betty. With her husband assuming the office of vice president, Ford became the second lady of the United States.

Before the end of December, Ford played a role in establishing the Republican Women's Federal Forum, partnering with Barbara Bush, whose husband George H. W. Bush was chairman of the Republican National Committee at the time. The organization sought to bring together political spouses and female federal government employees to discuss current party activities and ideas about legislation. Ford also, in a television interview with Barbara Walters, expressed her support for the United States Supreme Court's Roe v. Wade decision ruling abortion as constitutionally protected. Ford remarked, "I agree with the Supreme Court's ruling. I think it's time to bring abortion out of the backwoods and put it in the hospitals, where it belongs." Disregarding criticism to her stance, Ford would remark, "Maybe I shouldn't have said it, but I couldn't lie. That's the way I feel."

The media "broke" the story that Ford had a previous marriage and had been divorced, initially reporting it as a secret revelation. However, Ford simply responded by giving the explanation that it was not something that she had tried to hide, but rather, something that she had only neglected to share with the news media because none of them had broached the subject in their previous questions to her. This response proved effective in killing the speculation that she was covering-up her past and earned her some admiration in the media. At one point, Ford disclosed to the public that her husband had previously promised her that he would retire from the House of Representatives in 1976 in order to return to private legal practice and dedicate more time to his family. Ford became overwhelmed by the media attention she received and became somewhat reclusive for a period early into her time as second lady. However, by the spring of 1974, Ford was seen as embracing her position as second lady, becoming less reclusive and more active. Ford would, ultimately, for most of the nine months that she was second lady, be a high-profile public figure.

As she became a more active second lady, Ford adopted an objective of promoting the arts. In April 1974, she made her first official solo trip as second lady when she spent two-days visiting the states of Georgia and Tennessee to help in publicizing the "ARTRAIN", which was a traveling exhibit of art, visual displays, and performance pieces housed in six railway cars, and which was to travel through small towns across the southern United States. Ford was the most prominent national supporter of the project. Her candor on this trip received a positive reception by the news media. Among those that she met on the two-day trip was Georgia Governor Jimmy Carter and his wife Rosalynn. The Carters would ultimately go on to be the Fords' successors as president and first lady after Jimmy Carter defeated President Ford in the 1976 United States presidential election. On May 31, 1974, Ford made her first major speech when she gave a commencement address to the graduates of the Westminster Choir College. This set a contrast with First Lady Pat Nixon, who routinely rejected invitations to give formal speeches. Ford was also observed to be upgrading her wardrobe, adding designer clothing. In addition to the arts, Ford also gave focus to projects helping the disabled during her time as second lady.

On March 12, 1974, the Fords hosted a state dinner for King Hussein of Jordan after president Nixon, with a week's notice, asked Vice President Ford to take over for him in hosting the already-scheduled state dinner. The dinner was held in the John Quincy Adams Drawing Room, one of the Diplomatic Reception Rooms at the United States Department of State headquarters at the Harry S Truman Building.

In July 1974, Ford attended the funeral of Alberta Williams King, the assassinated mother of the late civil rights leader Martin Luther King Jr. Officials of the Nixon administration did not attend, instead attending to other obligations. Ford was the only individual in attendance at the funeral not directly ingrained in the civil rights movement or black politics, with the exception of Georgia Governor Jimmy Carter. Ford's attendance at the funeral was, in actuality, a break from the administration. Ford had believed it to be of great importance for the administration to show an expression of direct concern pertaining to the assassination, while Nixon's staff disagreed with her. Ford also broke from the administration in giving her support to the prospect of federally-funded child daycare, which the Nixon administration opposed.

Ford had an extremely busy schedule by July 1974. Magazines such as Vogue and Ladies Home Journal were planning to publish spreads on Ford in upcoming issues. With her husband, as vice president, tasked with heavily campaigning on behalf of his party for the 1974 midterm elections, Ford occasionally hit the campaign trail herself. Ford had declared that she would be accompanying her husband at campaign functions, "when he wants me to." The Fords had planned to make a diplomatic trip to European nations after the midterm elections.

Both Betty and Gerald Ford refused to comment on speculation that President Nixon might be forced out of office due to the Watergate scandal. Ford did indirectly indicate her willingness to step into the role of first lady by affirming that she would make any sacrifices required for her husband to carry out his constitutional obligations, but also opined that it would be traumatic if the nation had to endure a president being forced from office. Ford also publicly expressed admiration and friendship toward First Lady Pat Nixon.

== First Lady of the United States (1974–1977) ==
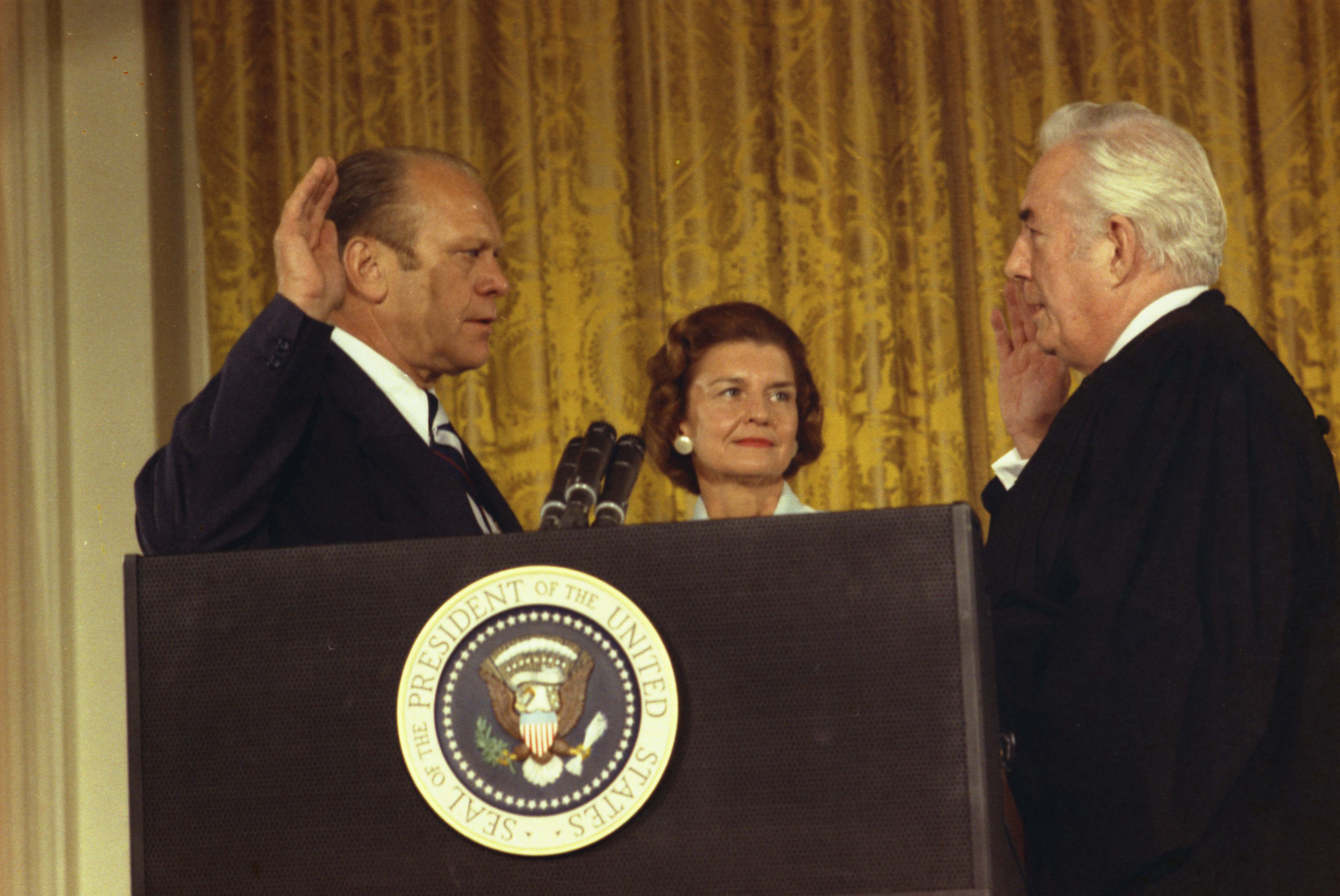
Vice President Gerald Ford is sworn in as the 38th President of the United States by Chief Justice Warren Burger in the East Room at the White House as Betty Ford looks on.

On August 9, 1974, after the resignation of Richard Nixon (who was facing the prospect of likely impeachment and removal from office), Gerald Ford ascended to the position of president of the United States and Betty Ford became the first lady of the United States. As was the case during Gerald Ford's vice presidential swearing-in, Betty Ford held the Bible upon which he placed his hand while taking his oath of office. In his remarks at his inauguration, Gerald Ford remarked, "I am indebted to no man and only one woman, my dear wife, Betty, as I begin this very difficult job."

=== Public image, influence, and candor ===
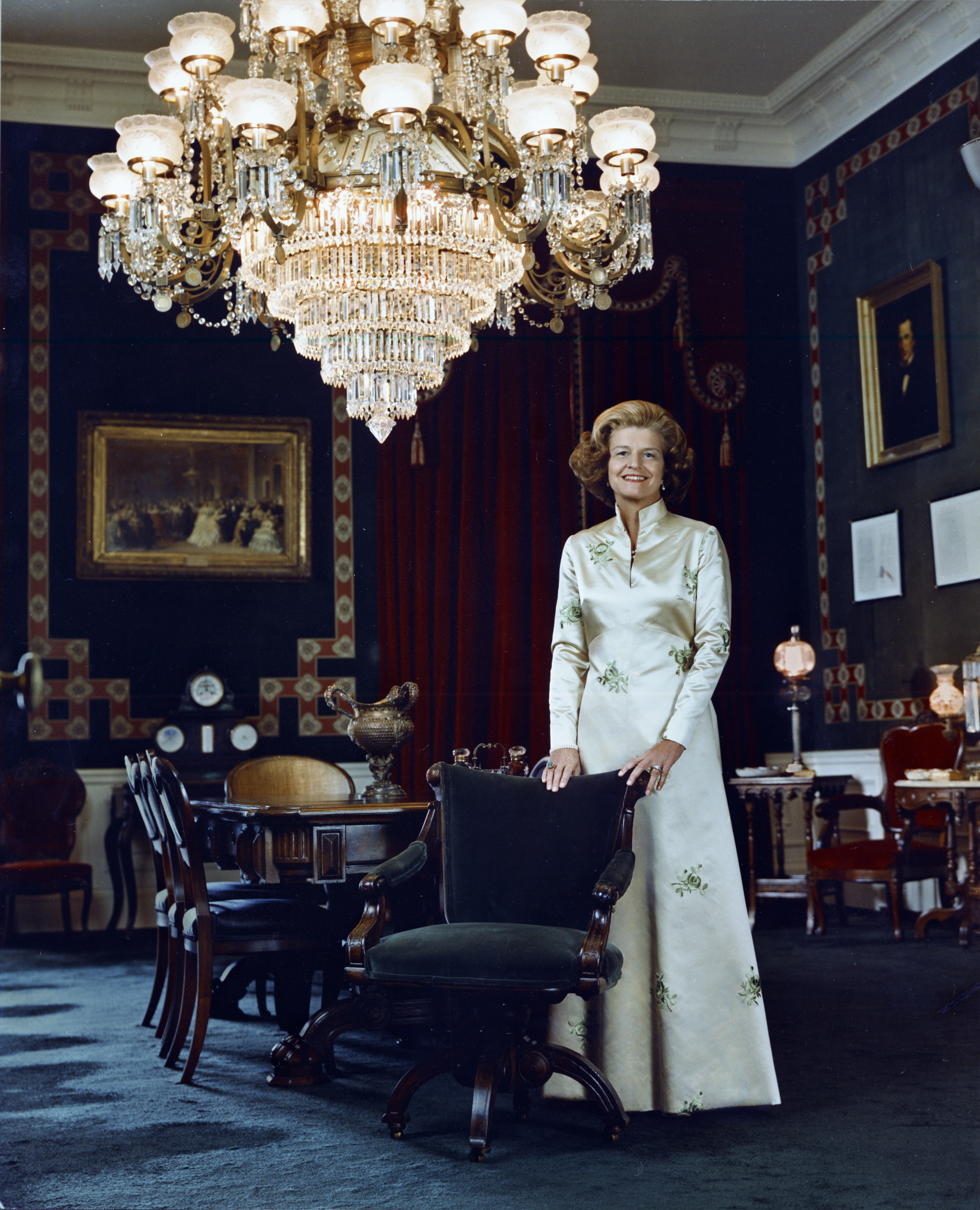
Official portrait as First Lady; 1975

At the time her husband assumed the presidency, reporters speculated on what kind of first lady Ford would be, as they thought her predecessor, Pat Nixon, as noted by one reporter, to be the "most disciplined, composed first lady in history." Ford ultimately became a popular and influential first lady. In the opinion of The New York Times and several presidential historians, "Mrs. Ford's impact on American culture may be far wider and more lasting than that of her husband, who served a mere 896 days, much of it spent trying to restore the dignity of the office of the president." She was regarded to be the most politically outspoken first lady since Eleanor Roosevelt, whom she regarded as a role model. Active in social policy, Ford broke new ground as a politically active presidential spouse.

Repeatedly speaking out on women's issues, Ford was a leader in championing the changing status of women in American society. Ford surprised the media and the public by explicitly supporting a woman's right to an abortion, the Equal Rights Amendment (ERA), and grassroots activism. Ford took these stances despite recognizing that they created a political risk of conservative backlash against her husband. However, not everything Ford did as first lady broke tradition. Ford also enjoyed the traditional role as hostess of the White House and on a daily basis spent most of her energy on the family, health, and serving as a surrogate for her husband on the political campaign trail.

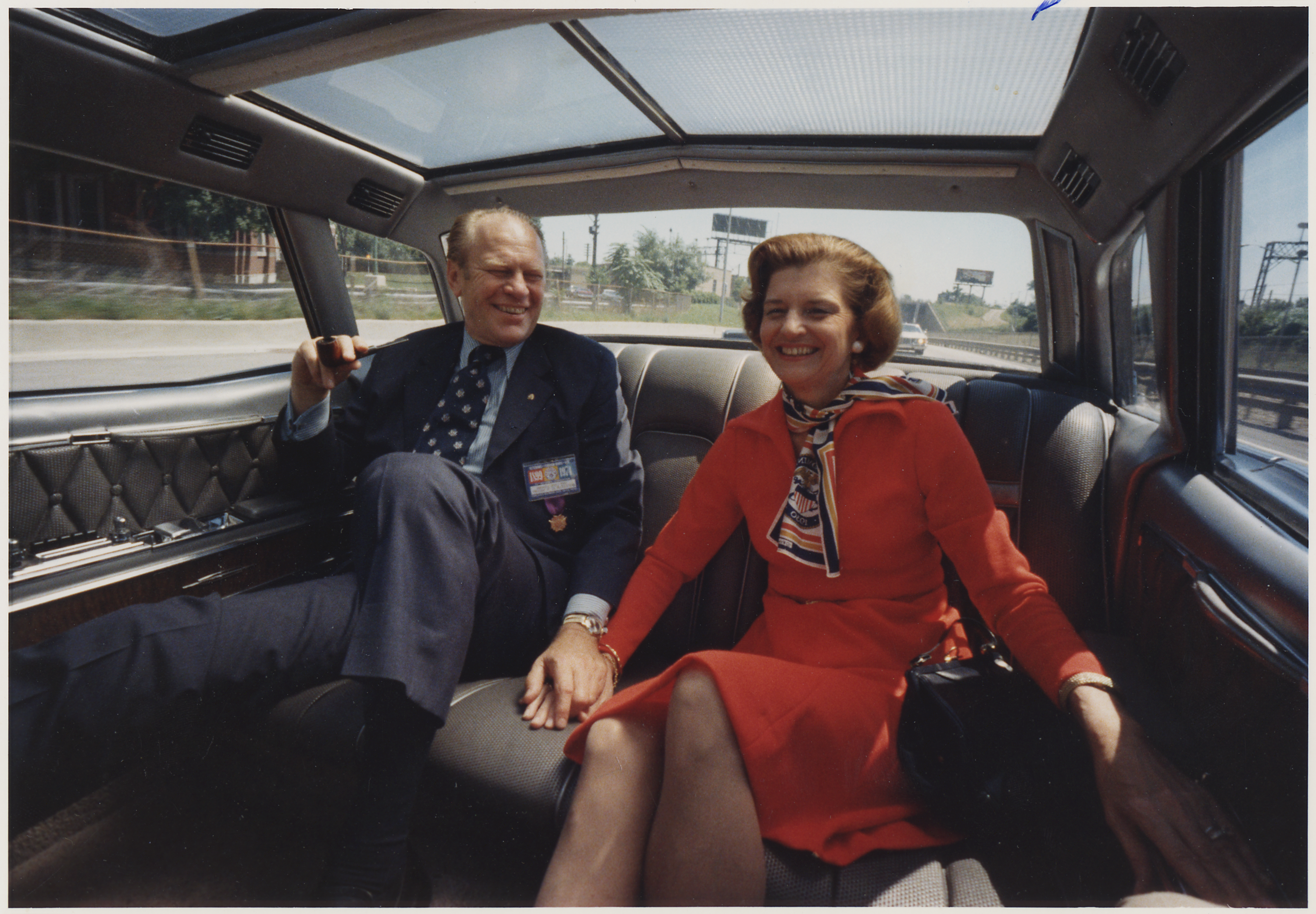
Betty and Gerald Ford riding in the presidential limousine in 1974

Steinhauer of The New York Times described Ford as "a product and symbol of the cultural and political times—doing the Bump dance along the corridors of the White House, donning a mood ring, chatting on her CB radio with the handle First Mama—a housewife who argued passionately for equal rights for women, a mother of four who mused about drugs, abortion and premarital sex aloud and without regret." Ford was open about the benefits of psychiatric treatment and spoke understandingly about marijuana use and premarital sex. The New York News Service wrote that Ford was "constitutionally incapable of uttering 'no comment' or otherwise fudging an answer." As first lady, remarking on her honest candor and the sometimes-controversial remarks it resulted in, Ford declared, "I am not very good at making up stories." In another instance, she commented, "it's just impossible for me to lie and look someone in the eyes and talk to them. This is my problem." While President Ford never attempted to silence his wife, some of his senior staff resented her independent candor. Margaret Brown Klapthor later wrote of Ford's candor, "she has the self-confidence to express herself with humor and forthrightness whether she speaks to friends, to the press or to a multitude."

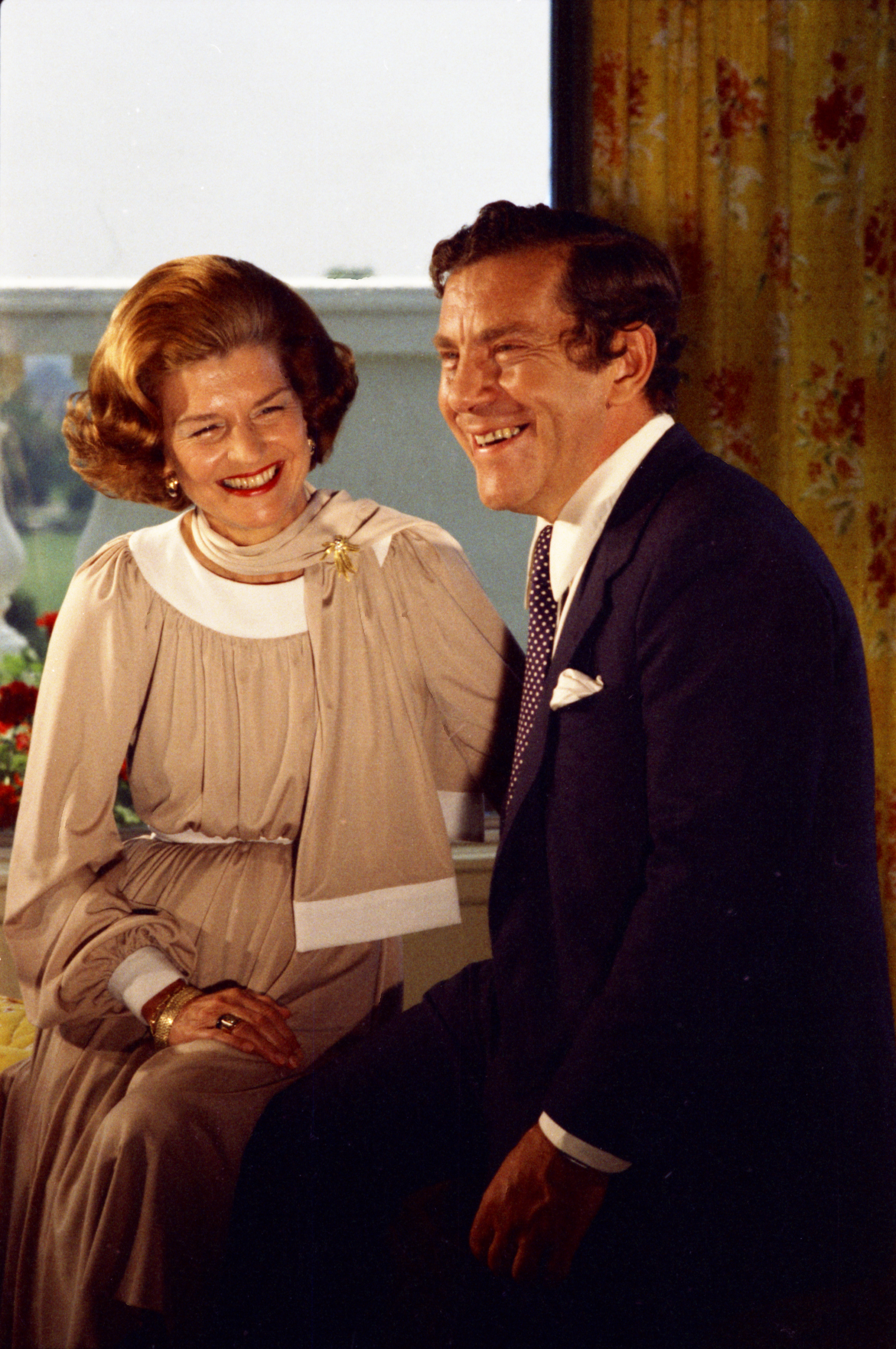
Ford sits in the White House Solarium with Morley Safer before filming her August 1975 60 Minutes interview with him.

Ford filmed an interview with the television news program 60 Minutes which was broadcast on August 10, 1975. The broadcast of the interview saw strong interest from the public. After the interview aired, a number of Ford's remarks in this interview on hot-button issues generated particularly immense media attention. Due to conservative backlash from Ford's comments on premarital sex, marijuana use, and abortion in the 60 Minutes interview, President Ford initially quipped to her that her comments had lost him a large number of votes. However, polling would show that her comments were accepted by many Americans.

In 1975, when Time named the "American women" as its Person of the Year, the magazine profiled Ford as one of eleven women selected to represent American women. That same year, People named Ford one of the three most intriguing people in America. In 1977, the World Almanac included Ford in its ranking of the 25 most-influential American women. In January 1976, Ford made a cameo appearance on the popular television program The Mary Tyler Moore Show.

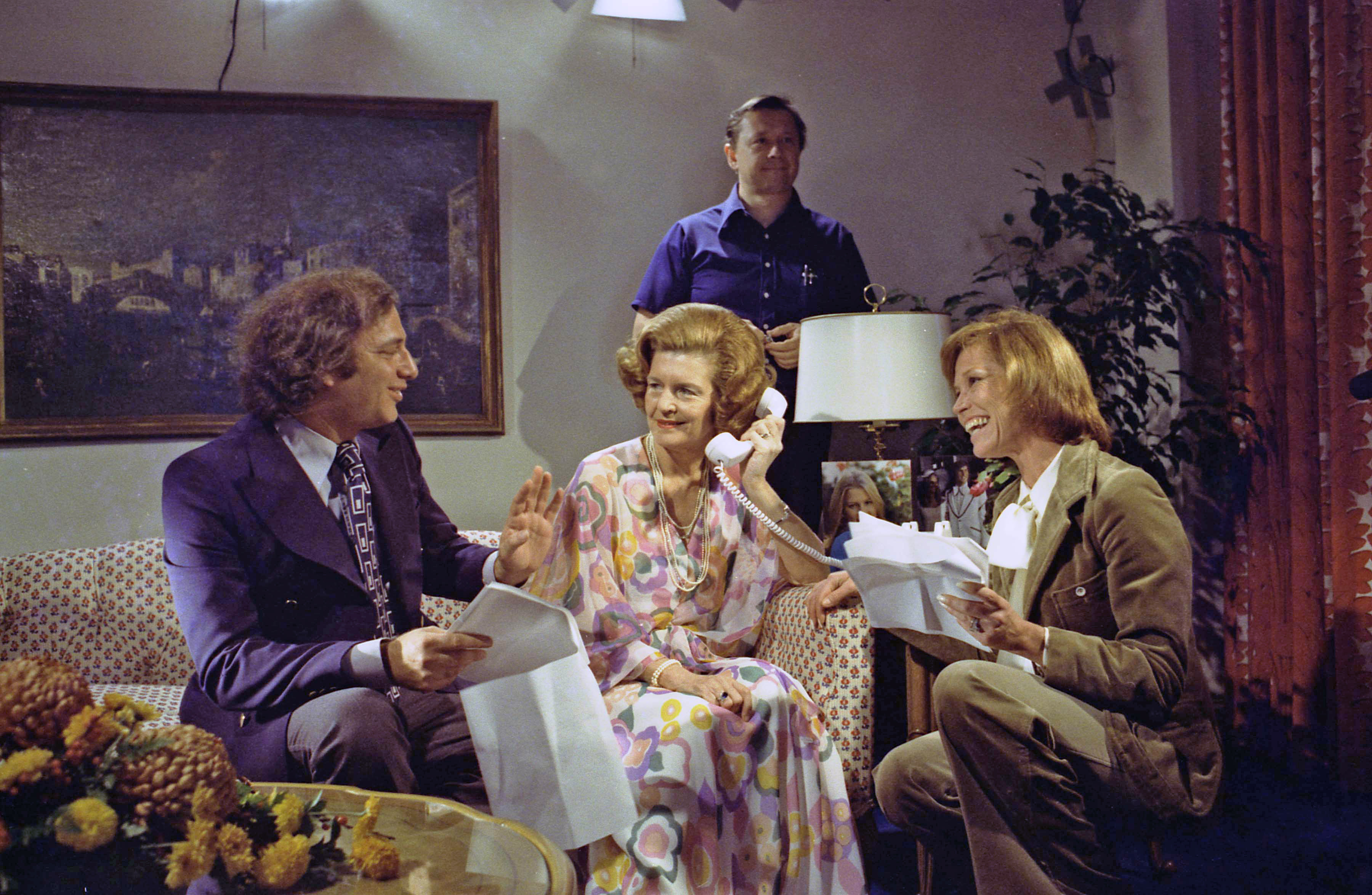
Ford in November 1975, sitting at the Hay–Adams Hotel with television producer Ed. Weinberger and actress Mary Tyler Moore during the filming of Ford's cameo appearance on The Mary Tyler Moore Show

The Fords were among the more openly affectionate first couples in United States history. Neither was shy about their mutual love and equal respect, and they were known to have a strong personal and political partnership. This open affection was evident from the beginning of Gerald Ford's presidency. Ford was observed audibly telling her husband "I love you" following a kiss they shared right after he was sworn in as president. Later that day, President Ford was caught momentarily patting Betty's buttocks before the press gathered outside of their Virginia residence. Weeks later, when the Fords moved from their Virginia residence into the White House their king size bed was photographed being moved into the White House, which prompted Betty to quip that they had been outed for breaking the tradition of first couples keeping separate bedrooms in the White House. Early into her time in the White House, during a televised tour of the White House, Ford once again noted that she and her husband shared the same bed. In a 1975 interview with McCall's, Ford remarked that reporters asked her everything except for how often she and the president had sex. "And if they'd asked me that I would have told them," she said, adding that her response would be, "as often as possible."

==== Popularity ====
Ford was popular with the American public. Her overall approval rating was, at times, as high as 75%. Ford's popularity often was higher than her husband's. Ford said, during her husband's failed 1976 presidential campaign, "I would give my life to have Jerry have my poll numbers." This is in-line with a common trend of American first ladies often being more popular than the presidents to whom they are married.

Ford ranked as one of the top-10 most admired women in the results of Gallup's annual most admired man and woman poll every year from 1974 (the year her husband first became president) through 1991, with the exception of Gallup having not conducted such a poll in 1976 (the final full year of her husband's presidency). The poll gauges Americans' most admired men and women without providing respondents any pre-arranged list of names. In 1974, Ford placed second in the poll. She placed first in 1975. In 1977, the year her husband left office, she placed fourth. After her tenure as first lady ended, she would top the poll for a second time in 1978, the year she had established herself as an advocate for people with drug and alcohol dependence. Contrarily to her, while President Ford ranked in the top-10 positions of most admired men in multiple years, he never managed to top it.

In Good Housekeeping's annual readers' poll of most admired women, Ford placed second in 1974 and first in 1975. By late-1975, Harris found Ford to have established herself as one of America's most popular first ladies. In January 1976, the editors of the New York News Service described Ford as being, "one of the most charming and popular First Ladies ever to occupy the White House".

==== Ranking in Gallup's annual poll of "Most Admired Women" ====
Year	Rank	Year	Rank	Year	Rank
1974	2nd	1980	3rd	1986	8th
1975	1st	1981	5th	1987	7th
1976	no poll conducted	1982	8th	1988	5th
1977	4th	1983	4th	1989	7th
1978	1st	1984	6th	1990	8th
1979	5th (tied with Jaclyn Smith)	1985	7th	1991	10th

===== Approval polling =====
Segment polled	Polling group	Date	Approve	Disapprove	Sample size	Margin-of-error	Source
National poll	Roper Center	1975	50%	36%			
National poll	Roper Center	1976	71%	24%			

=== Social policy and political activism ===
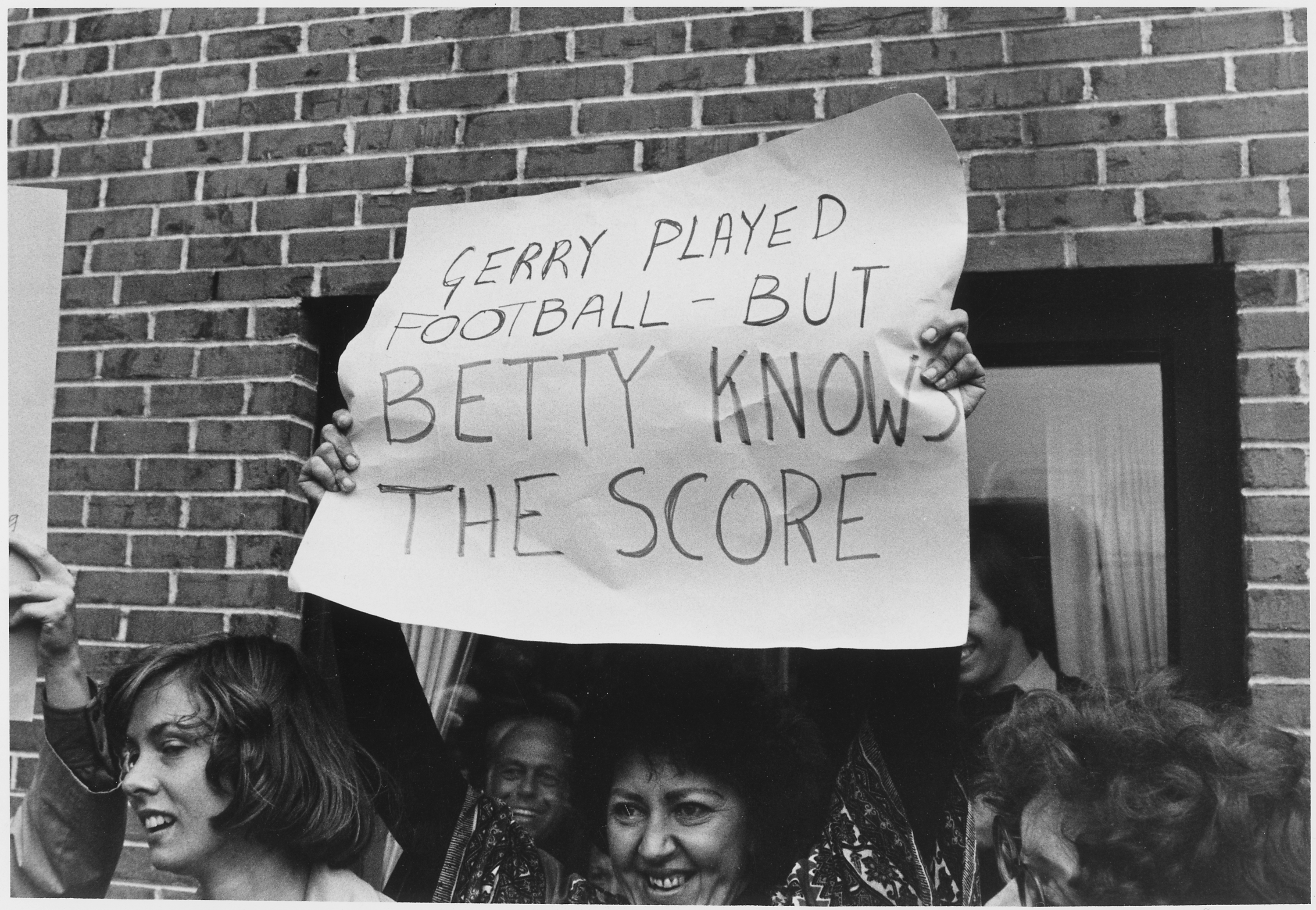
A sign being displayed in Portland, Maine, in August 1975 expressing support for Ford's stance on various women's issues

During her time as first lady, Ford was an outspoken advocate of women's rights and was a prominent force in the Women's Movement of the 1970s. Her active political role prompted Time to call her the country's "Fighting First Lady" and was the reason they profiled her, among several others, to represent the "American Women" as the magazine's 1975 Person of the Year. On September 4, 1974, weeks after becoming first lady, Ford conducted a press conference in the State Dining Room of the White House in which she remarked that she, "would like to be remembered in a very kind way; also as a constructive wife of a president." Of her outspokenness, Ford remarked in a speech delivered October 25, 1975, at the International Women's Year Conference, "I do not believe that being first lady should prevent me from expressing my views...Why should my husband's job or yours prevent us from being ourselves? Being ladylike does not require silence."

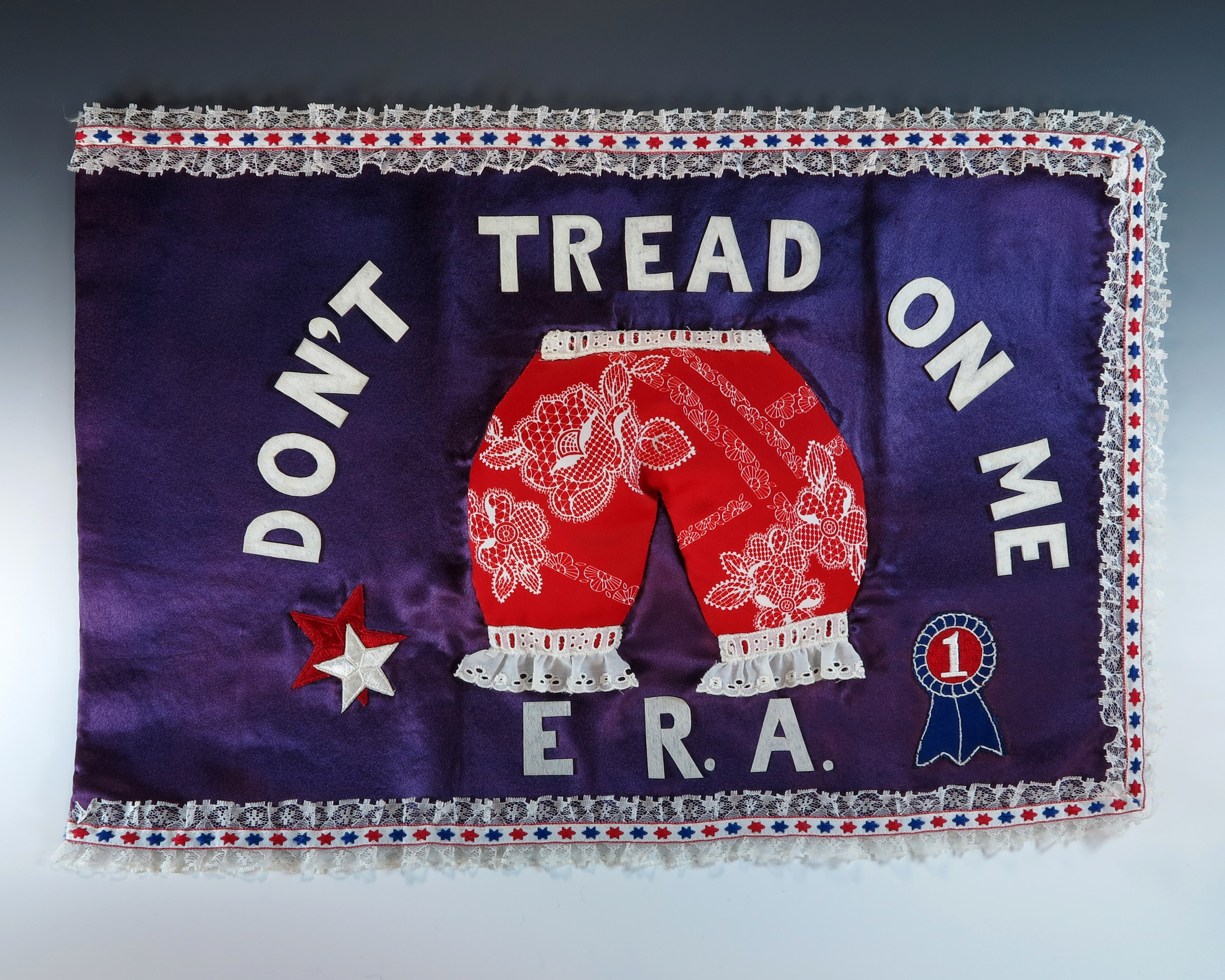
A handmade flag gifted to Betty Ford in appreciation of her support for the Equal Rights Amendment, featuring a depiction of a pair of bloomers (in reference to Ford's maiden name)

Ford avidly supported the proposed Equal Rights Amendment. In her September 4, 1974 press conference, Ford declared her support for it. Ford lobbied state legislatures to ratify the amendment, and took on opponents of the amendment. Ford utilized phone calls, letter-writing, and telegrams as means of lobbying in support of the ERA.

Ford was also staunchly pro-abortion rights. In a 1975 interview with the news program 60 Minutes, Ford called Roe v. Wade a "great, great decision". Ford's abortion position differed from the political platform of the Republican Party. For a long time, it was unclear whether Gerald Ford shared his wife's pro-abortion rights viewpoint. In December 1999, he told interviewer Larry King that he, too, was pro-abortion rights and had been criticized for that stance by conservative forces within the Republican Party.

Ford successfully lobbied her husband to, in 1975, sign an executive order to establish the National Commission on the Observance of International Women's Year. Ford also, unsuccessfully, lobbied her husband to appoint the first woman to the Supreme Court of the United States or as a running mate in the 1976 election. Ford took personal credit for the appointment of Carla Anderson Hills as secretary of Housing and Urban Development.

In May 1975, during a four-day trip, Ford met with Nguyễn Cao Kỳ (the former prime minister of the Republic of Vietnam) to discuss Southeast Asian refugees. Afterwards, Ford stated she was impressed with the conduct of the refugees.

Ford's involvement in political issues received some conservative criticism. Phyllis Schlafly accused Ford of acting improperly by intervening in state affairs. Some women protested Ford's lobbying for the ERA by carrying placards outside of the White House reading "Betty Ford, Get Off the Phone". On June 30, 1976, Ford attended the opening of "Remember the Ladies", a Revolutionary War-era women's exhibit. She drew boos from demonstrators against the Equal Rights Amendment in stating, "This exhibit about neglected Americans should give us strength and courage to seek equal rights for women today."

=== Health and breast cancer awareness ===
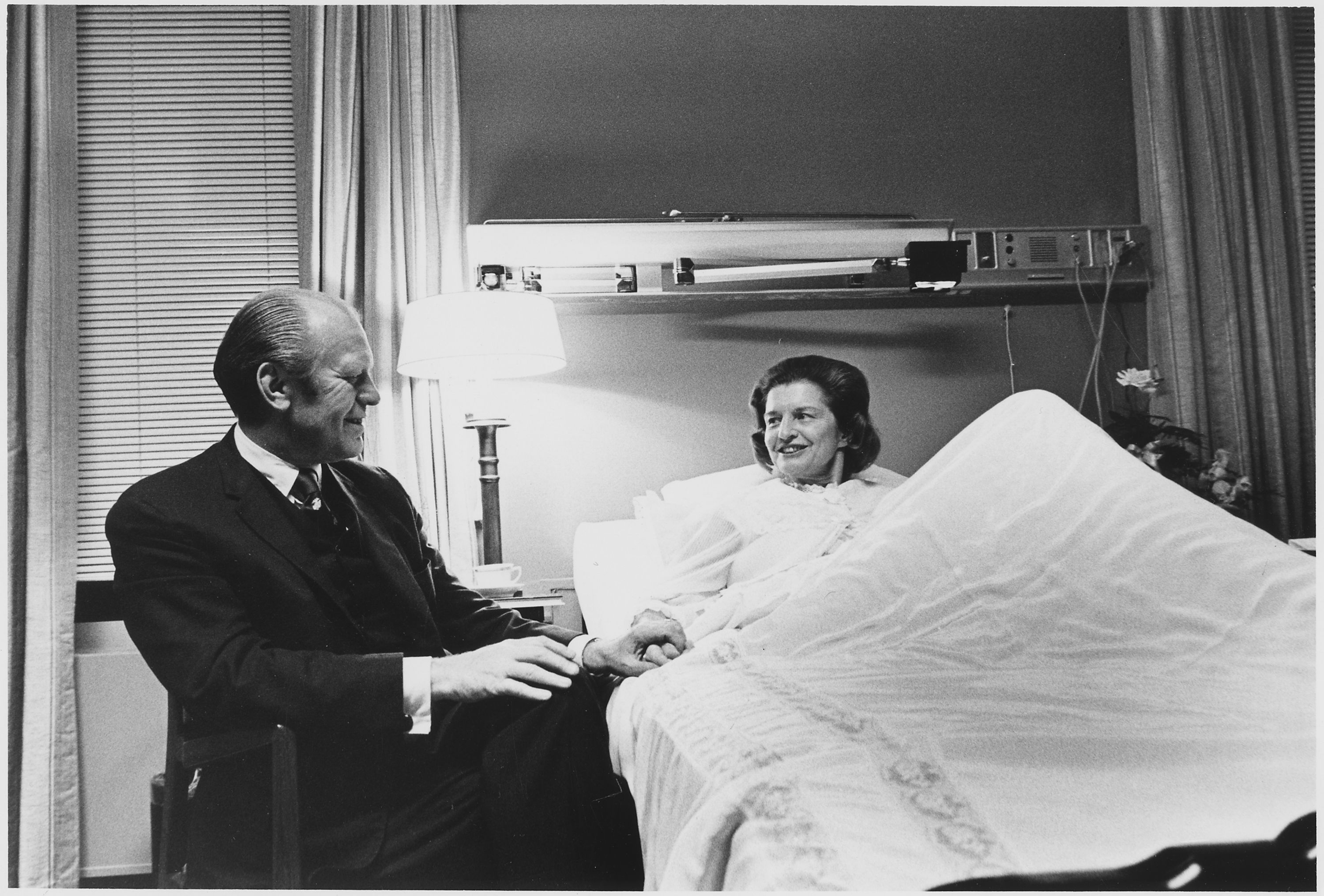
President Ford sits at Betty's bedside at Bethesda Naval Hospital on October 2, 1974, as she recovers from her mastectomy.

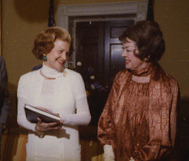
Ford hosts actress Rosalind Russell at the White House on May 11, 1976. Russell was suffering from breast cancer, and would die 6 months later.

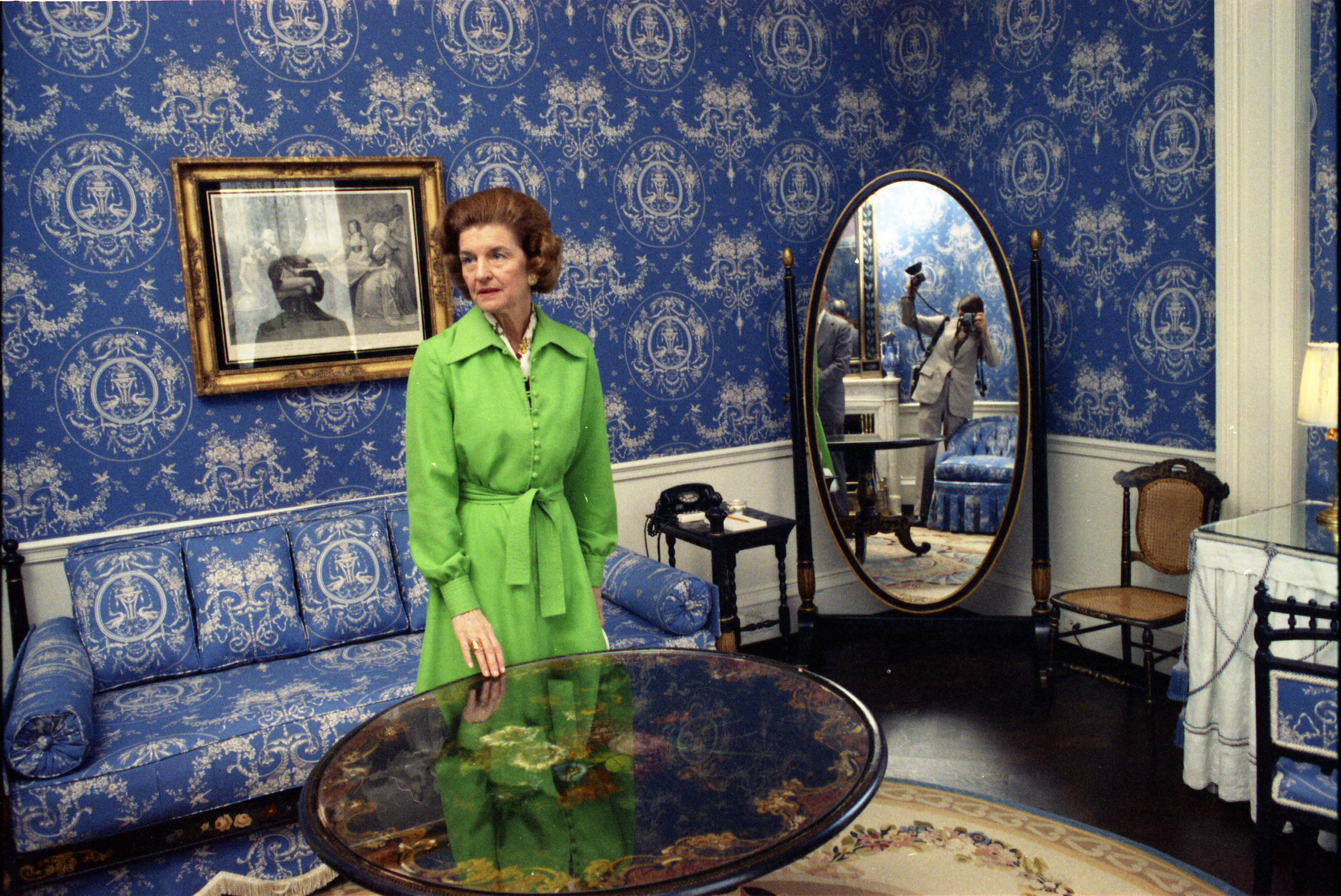
Ford viewing the Queen's Sitting Room during a tour of the White House, 1977

Weeks after Ford became first lady, she underwent a mastectomy for breast cancer on September 28, 1974, after having been diagnosed with the disease. Ford decided to be open about her illness because "There had been so much cover-up during Watergate that we wanted to be sure there would be no cover-up in the Ford administration." She was the first American First Lady to permit for the public release of reports on her own medical condition since Florence Harding in 1922. Her openness about her cancer and treatment raised the visibility of a disease that Americans had previously been reluctant to talk about. Ford commented to Time,

When other women have this same operation, it doesn't make any headlines. But the fact that I was the wife of the President put it in headlines and brought before the public this particular experience I was going through. It made a lot of women realize that it could happen to them. I'm sure I've saved at least one person—maybe more.

Adding to heightened public awareness of breast cancer were reports that several weeks after Ford's surgery, Happy Rockefeller (the wife of Ford's then-pending nominee for vice president, Nelson Rockefeller) also had a mastectomy. The spike in women self-examining after Ford went public with the diagnosis led to an increase in reported cases of breast cancer, a phenomenon known as the "Betty Ford blip".

After her mastectomy, Ford received chemotherapy treatments and saw regular checkups. White House Physician William M. Lukash claimed in a March 1975 statement that Ford was suffering no side effects from her chemotherapy.

In March 1975, Ford temporarily cut back her public schedule after suffering a flareup of her chronic arthritis.

=== The arts ===
As First Lady, Ford was an advocate of the arts. She successfully lobbied her husband to award the Presidential Medal of Freedom to choreographer and dancer Martha Graham in 1976. She received an award from Parsons The New School for Design in recognition of her style.

=== State dinners ===
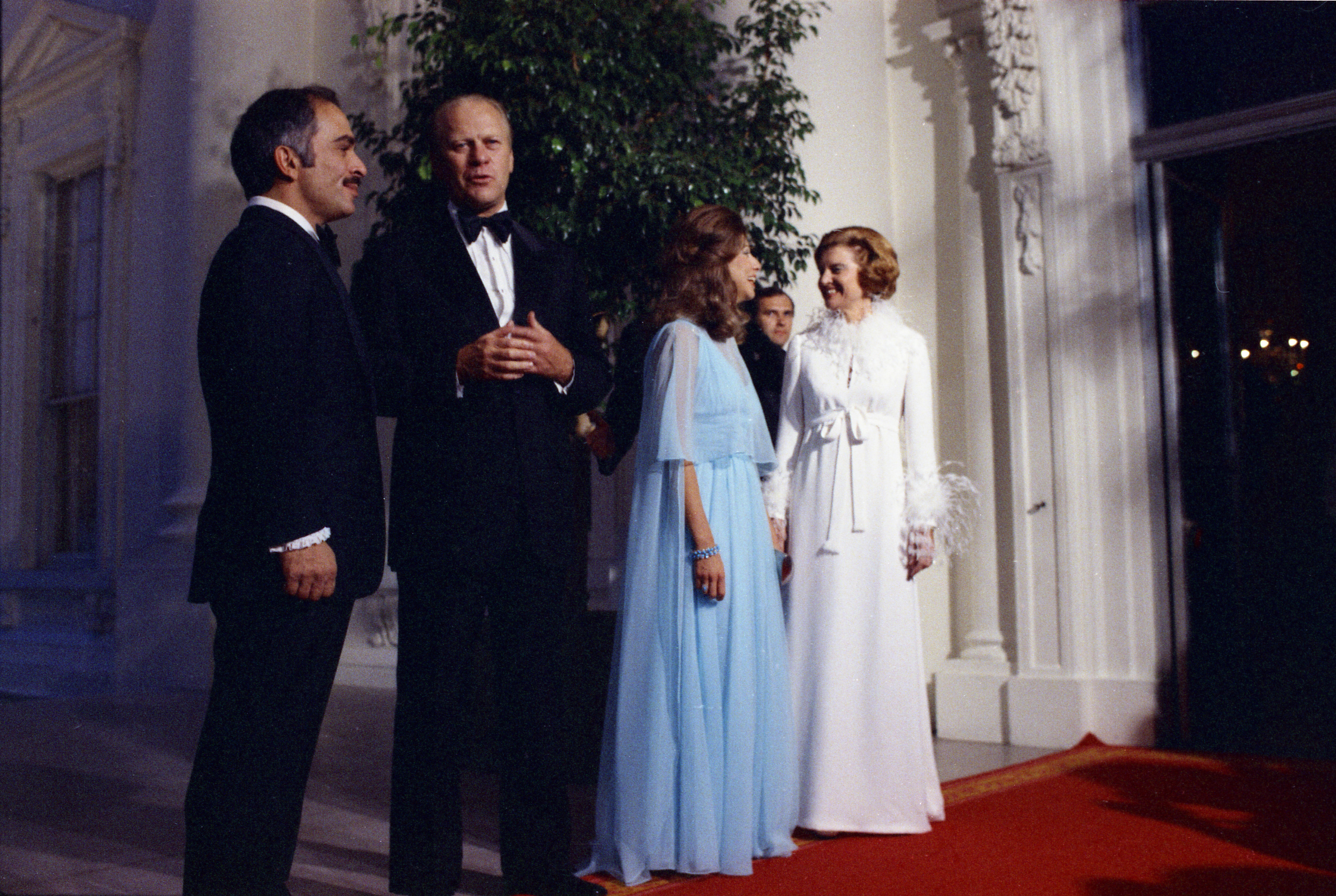
Betty and Gerald Ford with King Hussein and Queen Alia of Jordan at the first state dinner of Gerald Ford's presidency on August 16, 1974

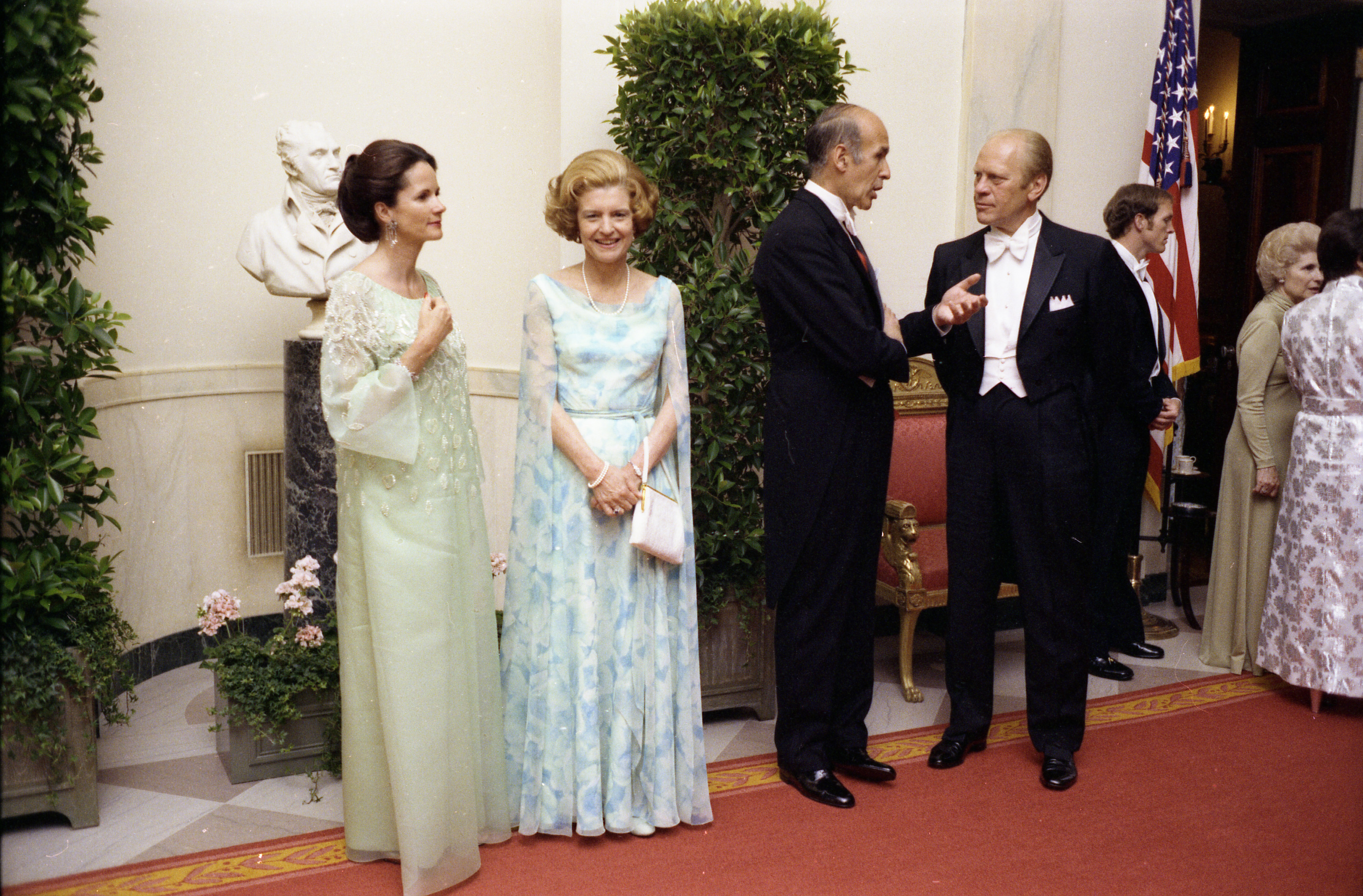
Betty and Gerald with French President Valéry Giscard d'Estaing and his wife Anne-Aymone Giscard d'Estaing at a May 17, 1976, state dinner in their honor

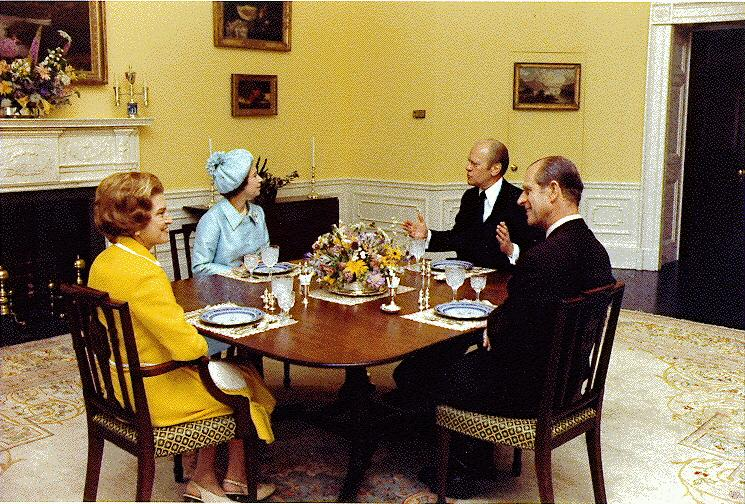
The Fords host Queen Elizabeth II and her husband the Duke of Edinburgh in the President's Dining Room during a 1976 state visit.

Despite the brevity of her husband's presidency (roughly two and a half years), the Ford White House hosted 33 state dinners, the fifth most state dinners of any United States presidency. The first of these came only a week into Ford's presidency, hosting King Hussein of Jordan on August 16, 1974. Once she became first lady, it fell to Ford to arrange this already-scheduled dinner. She found out of this upcoming dinner and her responsibility for planning it through a phone call she received within 24-hours after her husband's swearing-in as president. As previously mentioned, the Fords had hosted a state dinner for King Hussein months earlier, during Gerald Ford's vice presidency, on March 12, 1974, after president Nixon asked then-Vice President Ford to take over for him in hosting a planned dinner for the King. At the first state dinner that she arranged as first lady, Ford revived dancing as an activity of White House state dinners. The Nixons had previously removed dancing from the state dinners during Nixon's presidency. At the state dinners of the Ford presidency, the president and first lady always led off the dancing, and dancing often lasted beyond midnight.

The Fords opted to have eclectic array of guests at their state dinners, including notable celebrities from the entertainment industry. The Fords' children often also attended the dinners they hosted.

During their final year in the White House, the Fords hosted eleven state dinners. This large number of state dinners was, in part, due to great interest from foreign dignitaries in visiting the United States for a state dinner amid the United States Bicentennial celebrations. Ford made the decision that year to erect a tent in the White House Rose Garden to host dinners outside. For state dinners held using this tent, the receptions, entertainment, and dancing portions of the evenings were still held inside of the White House.

Among the most notable state dinners the Fords hosted was a July 7, 1976 state dinner honoring Queen Elizabeth II and Prince Philip, the Duke of Edinburgh. This dinner was part of the American bicentennial celebrations, and was held in the tent on the South Lawn of the White House.

Of the state dinners she planned, Ford said, "From the beginning, Jerry and I tried to make the White House a place where people could have fun and enjoy themselves. Most of all we wanted the state dinners to express the very best about America, particularly during the bicentennial year."

Dishes that Ford particularly liked serving at state dinners included wild rice, Columbia River salmon, soufflé, and flambé. The state dinners that Ford planned as first lady made a deliberate effort to showcase American ingredients. By late 1974, Ford had shifted to exclusively serving wine that was American-cultivated at state dinners. The November 12, 1974 state dinner for Austrian Chancellor Bruno Kreisky saw the first instance in which a wine from the Fords' home state of Michigan was served at a White House state dinner, with wine from the Tabor Hill Winery being served. It was not until 2016, during the presidency of Barack Obama, that a Michigan wine would again be served at a White House state dinner.

Additional images
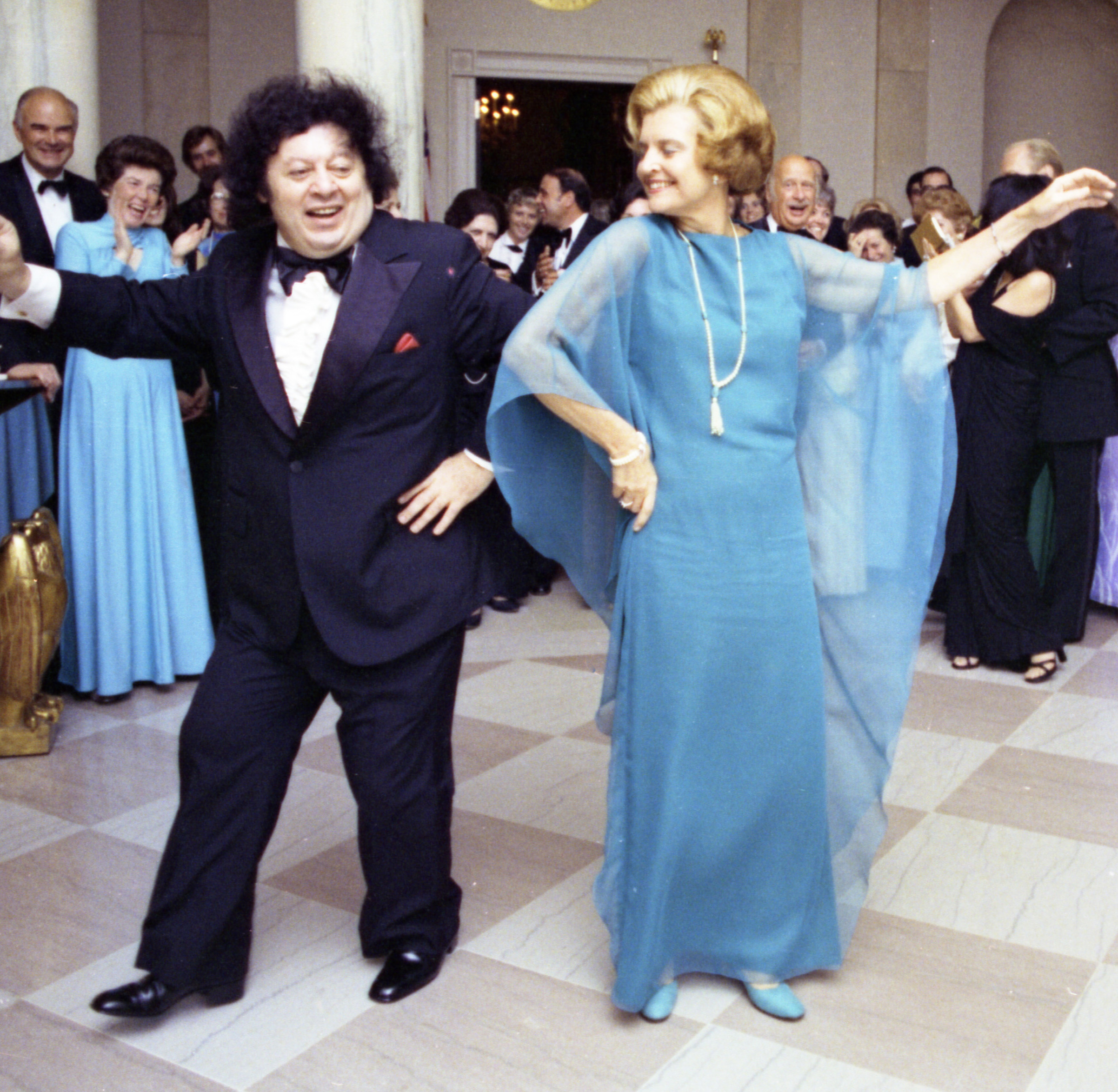
Ford dancing with comedian Marty Allen in the Entrance Hall of the White House of the White House during a September 21, 1976 state dinner in honor Liberian President William Tolbert

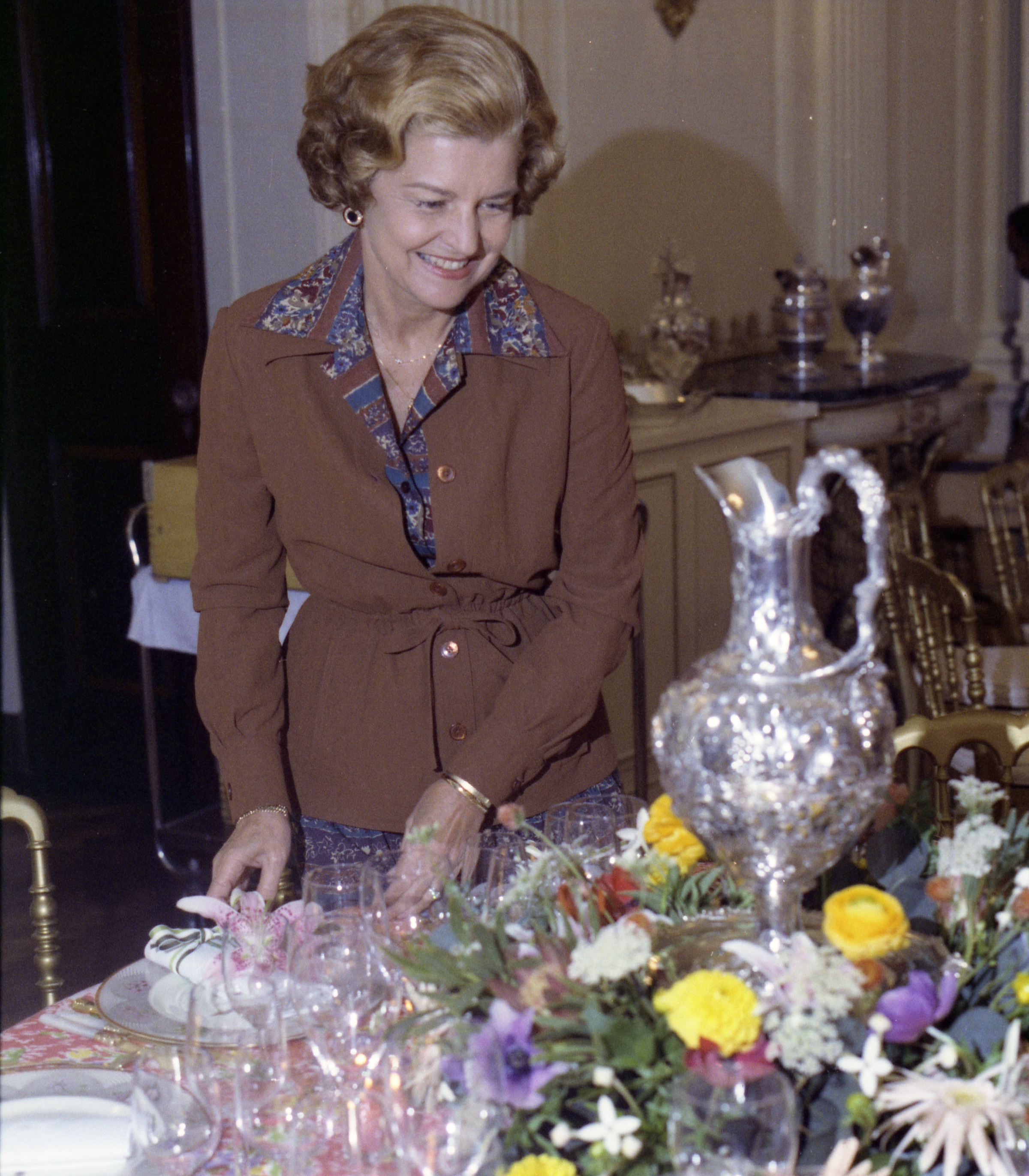
Ford reviews the table settings while preparing for the September 21, 1976 state dinner in honor of Liberian President William Tolbert.

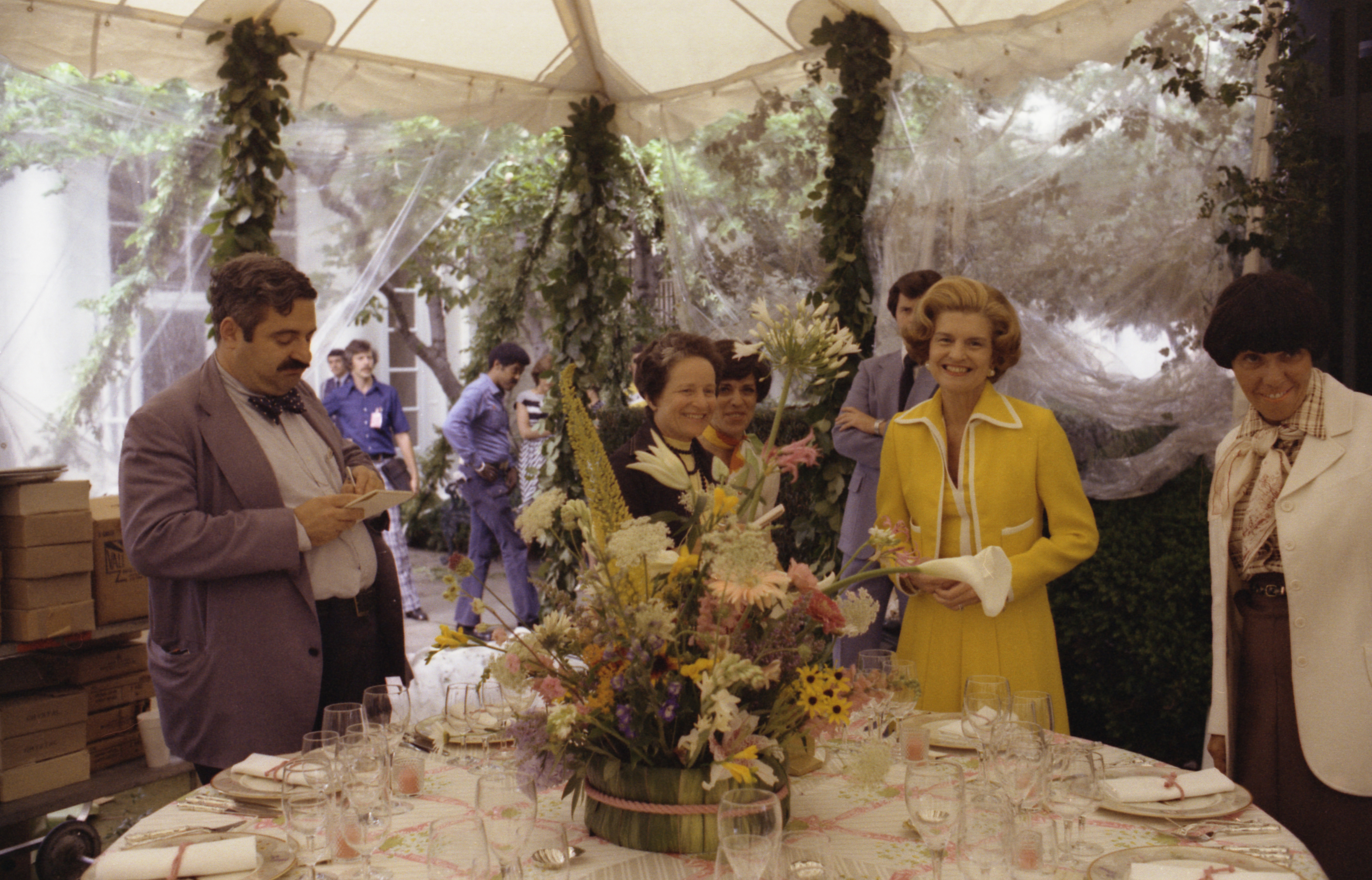
Ford and Social Secretary Maria Downs give the media a tour of the tent erected in the South Lawn for the July 1976 state dinner honoring Queen Elizabeth II and Prince Philip of Great Britain.

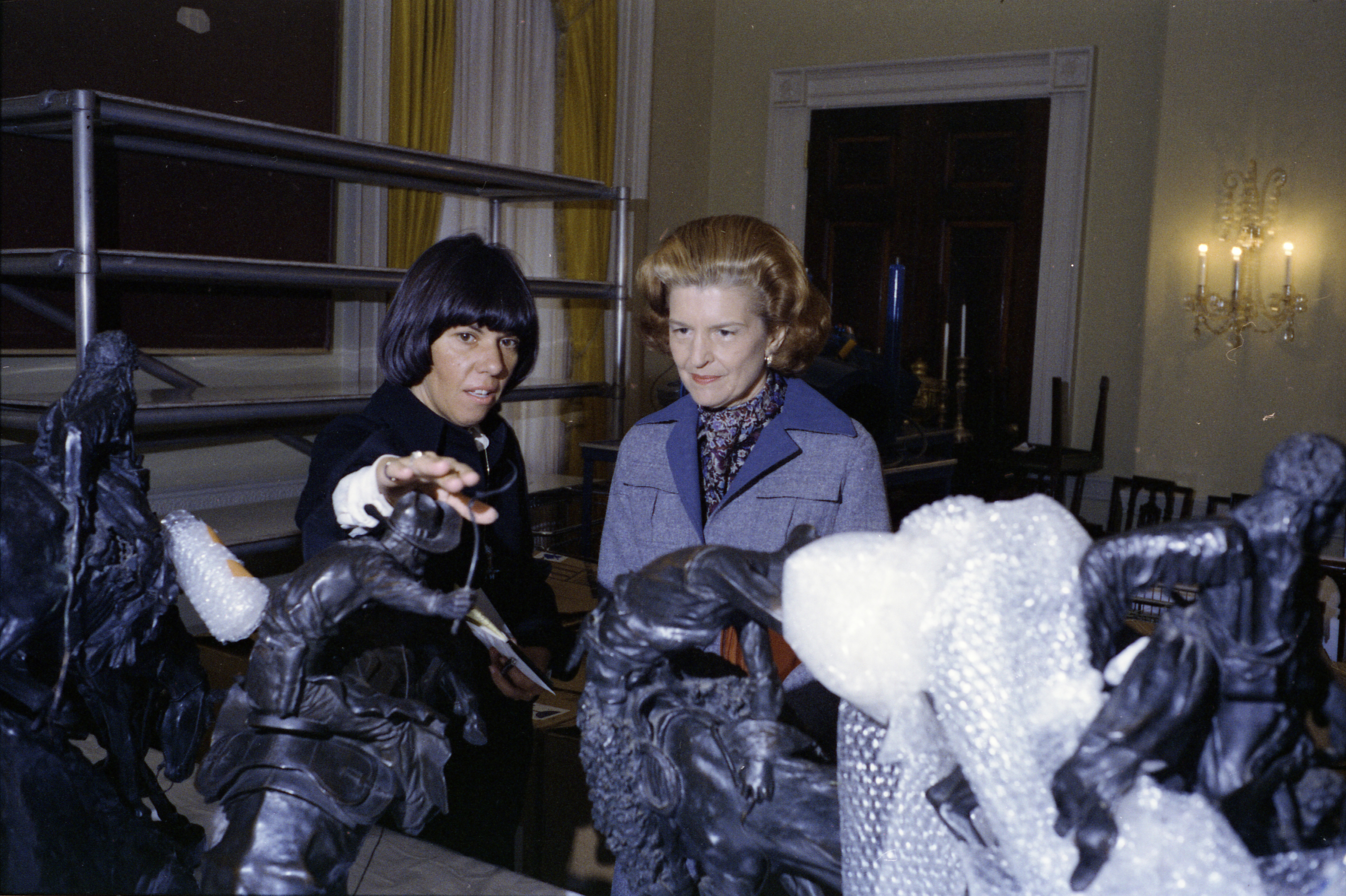
Ford and Social Secretary Maria Downs inspect centerpiece sculptures designed by Frederic Remington and Charles Russell ahead of an October 1975 state dinner honoring Anwar Sadat, the president of Egypt.

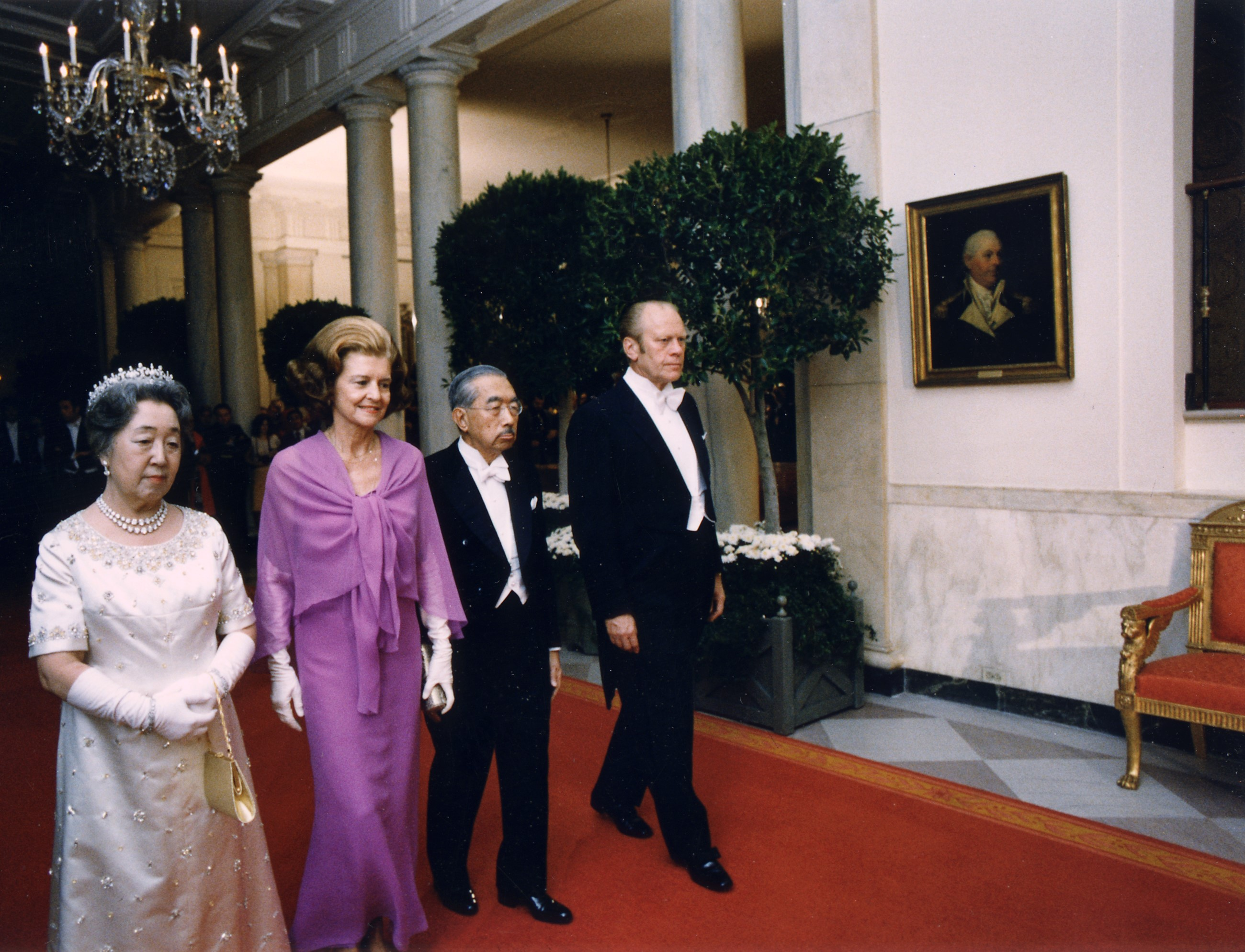
The Fords escort Japanese Emperor Hirohito and Empress Kōjun down the Cross Hall towards the East Room during an October 1975 state dinner honoring the Japanese royals.

=== Diplomatic trips ===
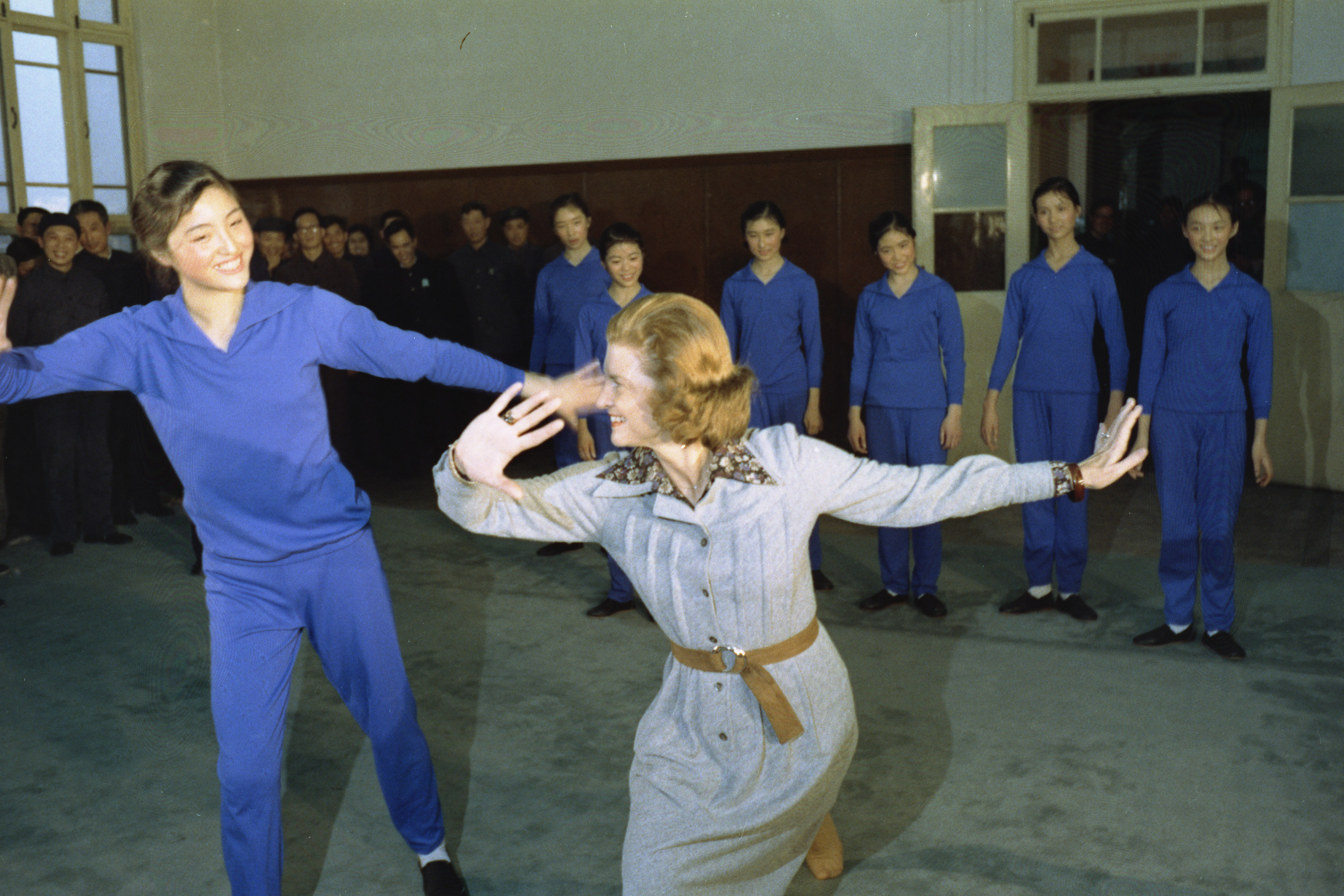
Ford joining dance students at the May 7th College of Art in Beijing, China (December 3, 1975)

Ford accompanied her husband abroad on several diplomatic trips. Among the nations that Ford accompanied her husband to were China, Poland, Romania, and Yugoslavia.

Ford did not take any solo trips abroad as first lady. She is the most recent first lady not to have done so. The first instance of a first lady conducting one had been Eleanor Roosevelt in 1942. Ford's recent predecessor Lady Bird Johnson was among other first ladies that did not conduct solo trips abroad.

During the Fords' December 1975 trip to mainland China, when being shown an exhibition by a Chinese arts college dance group, Ford decided to join the dancers. Photos of this moment were published widely in the American press, resulting in Betty Ford somewhat upstaging President Ford in the press.

=== Philanthropic causes ===
Ford supported numerous charities as first lady. Ford assisted in fundraising for the little-known Hospital for Sick Children in Washington, D.C., whose patients were predominantly African American. She also fundraised for No Greater Love, in appreciation of its work benefiting Children of Vietnam War MIA and POWs. She served as the honorary president of the National Lupus Foundation, regarding lupus as a disease which impacted women, yet received minimal public attention. Her philanthropic support additionally placed a specific focus on charities serving children with special needs.

=== Role in the 1976 presidential campaign ===
In November 1975, it was reported by the Associated Press that Ford's husband's advisors, who had previously worried her outspoken comments would hurt him in the 1976 presidential election, were now recognizing her popularity and desiring for her to have a greater role in the campaign. Ford ultimately played an important role in the 1976 election campaign. Ford made campaign appearances and delivered speeches across the United States.

Ford was also used, both by Ford supporters and detractors, as a symbol of liberal Republicanism. Supporters admired and detractors disapproved of how her politics contrasted with both the Republican Party's conservative and moderate wings.

During the campaign, many Ford supporters wore campaign buttons with phrases like "Betty's Husband for President in '76" and "Keep Betty in the White House". The use of Ford in such a manner to promote her husband's candidacy was not the work of the campaign itself, but rather, produced by supporters outside of the campaign organization. The campaigns of the previous three presidents that sought election to an additional term (Dwight D. Eisenhower, Lyndon B. Johnson, Richard Nixon) had needed to manufacture campaign publicity involving their first ladies (Mamie Eisenhower, Lady Bird Johnson, and Pat Nixon). In contrast, there was tremendous organic excitement for Betty Ford among supporters of the campaign.

Ford campaigned actively both during primary elections and the general election. A contrast was publicly drawn between Ford and Nancy Reagan, the wife of Ford's primary election challenger Ronald Reagan. Reagan had contrasting views on issues such as drug experimentation by teenagers and the Equal Rights Amendment (which she opposed passing). Many of Ford's views were aligned with, or even more liberal than, Rosalynn Carter, the wife of Ford's Democratic general election opponent Jimmy Carter.

During the primaries, Ford recorded radio advertisements on behalf of the campaign that were broadcast in New Hampshire. She also traveled to Iowa before its caucus, and delivered a speech on behalf of the president (who had been unable to make his planned appearance) in which she labeled herself as being his political partner. The campaign made a deliberate effort, ahead of the 1976 Republican National Convention, of sending Ford to liberal and moderate-leaning states and not more conservative states in the western and southern United States.

Between Labor Day and election day, for the general election campaign, Ford conducted multi-stop speaking tours, during which she visited western states (including California, Colorado, Texas, and Utah) as well was northern midwest states including Illinois, Michigan, and Wisconsin. In total, Ford made nine campaign stops on her husband's behalf during the general election campaign.

The heavy campaigning placed a strain on Ford's health. During the general election, her busy campaign activity saw the reigniting of her pinched nerve. However, even after this, Ford continued with her planned campaign schedule.

After Gerald Ford's defeat by Jimmy Carter in the 1976 presidential election, she delivered her husband's concession speech because he had lost his voice while campaigning. The speech was delivered on the day after the election. This is the only time that a major United States presidential candidate's spouse has delivered their concession on their behalf.

After her husband's narrow defeat, there was anecdotal speculation published that Ford may have simultaneously lost and gained her husband support from different ideological demographics. Such speculation posited that she had likely lost him votes from conservative Republicans, who were alienated by Betty Ford's public stances. Such speculation also posited that she had, however, likely increased the votes her husband received from liberal and moderate Republicans, Democrats, and independents.

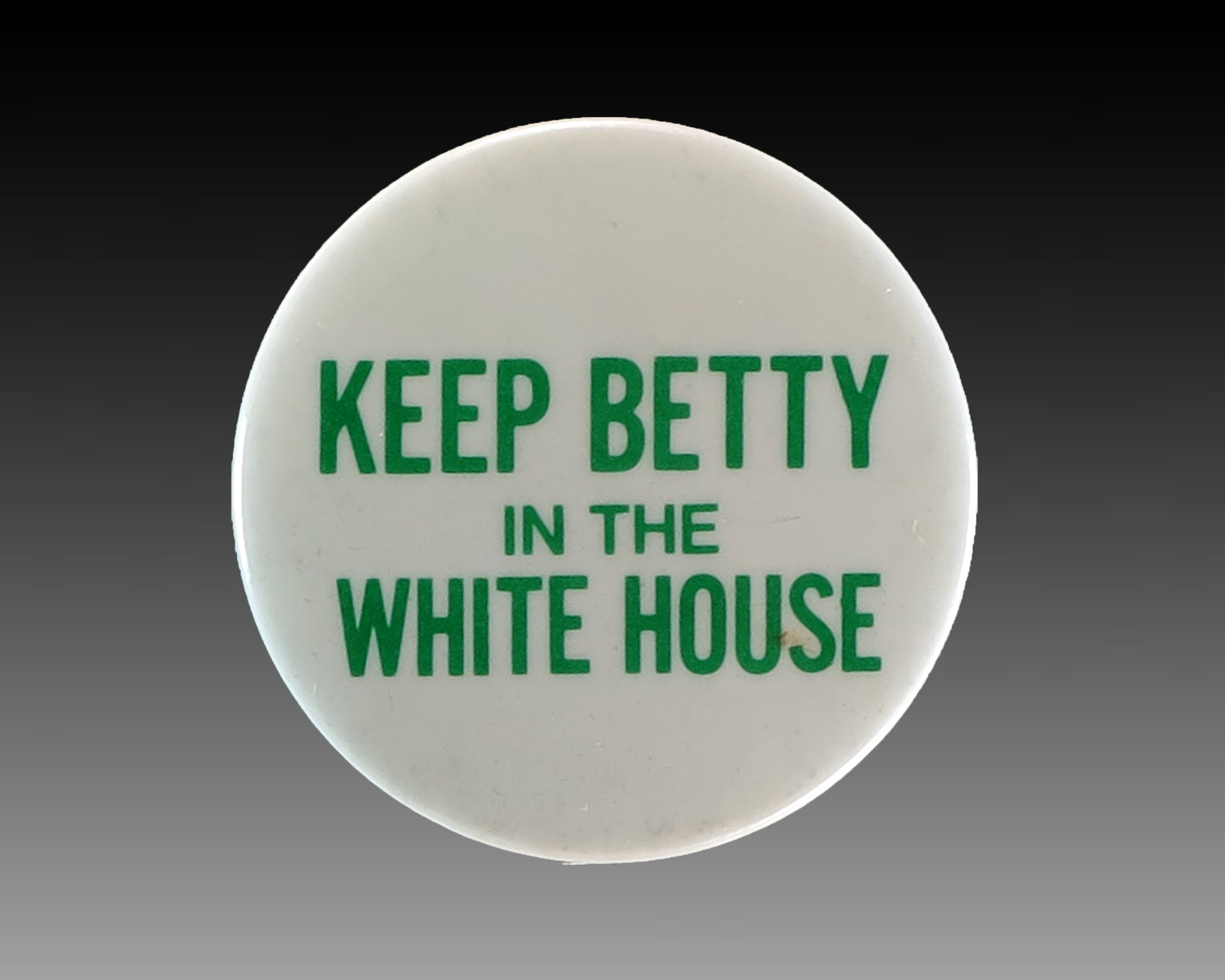
Campaign button in support of President Ford's 1976 presidential campaign with the phrase "Keep Betty in the White House"

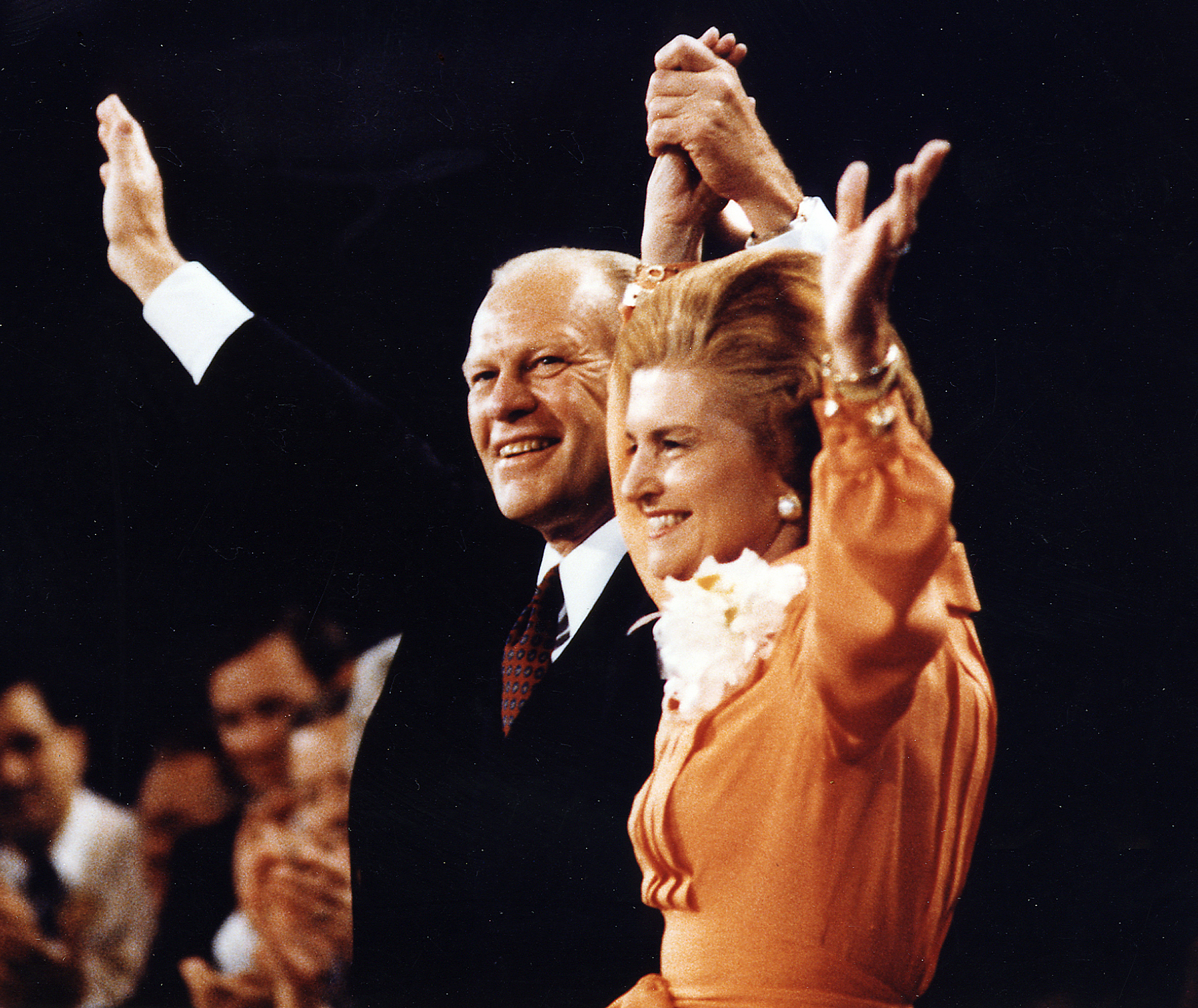
Betty and Gerald Ford onstage at the 1976 Republican National Convention

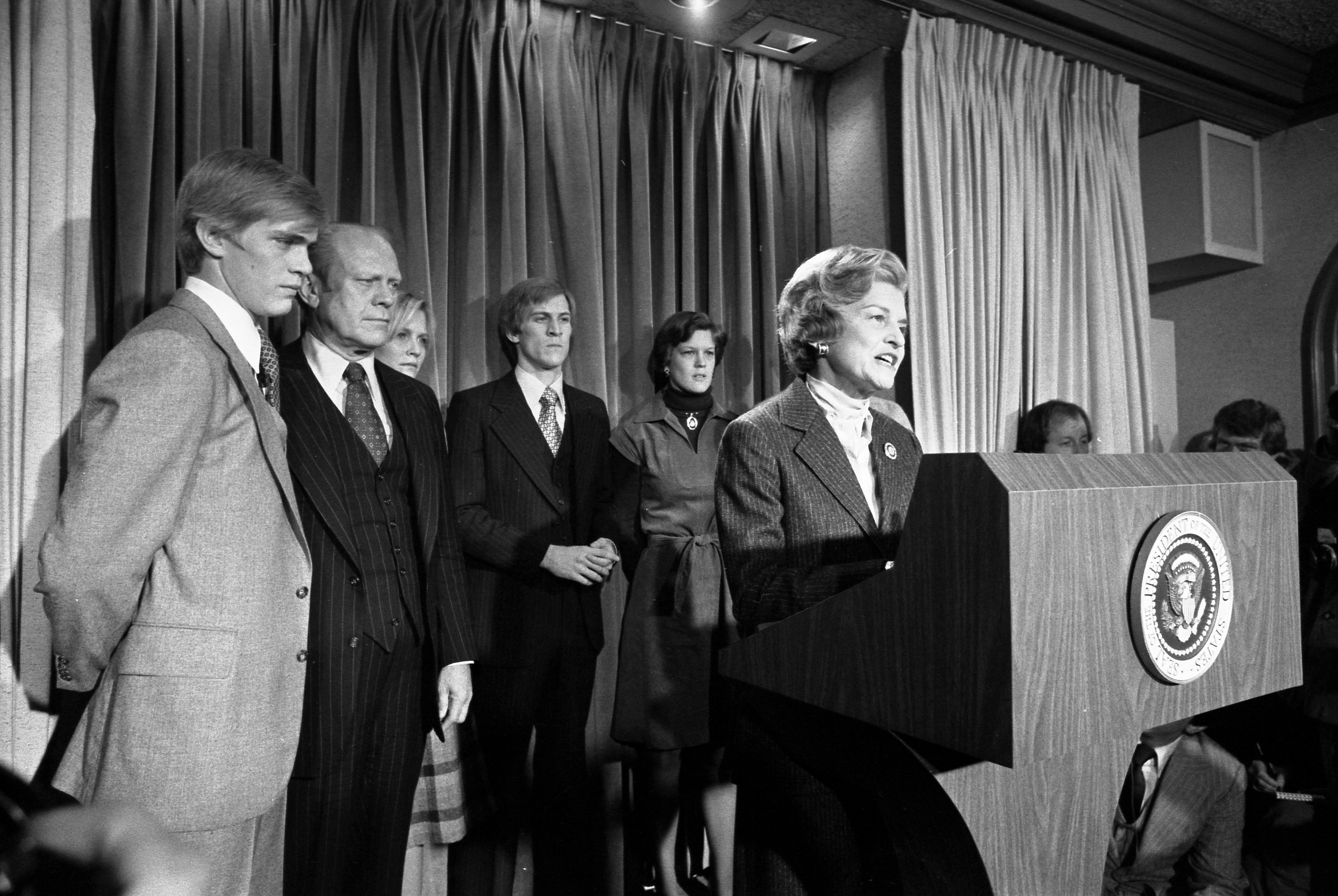
Ford reads her husband's 1976 presidential concession speech to the press.

=== Departure from the White House ===
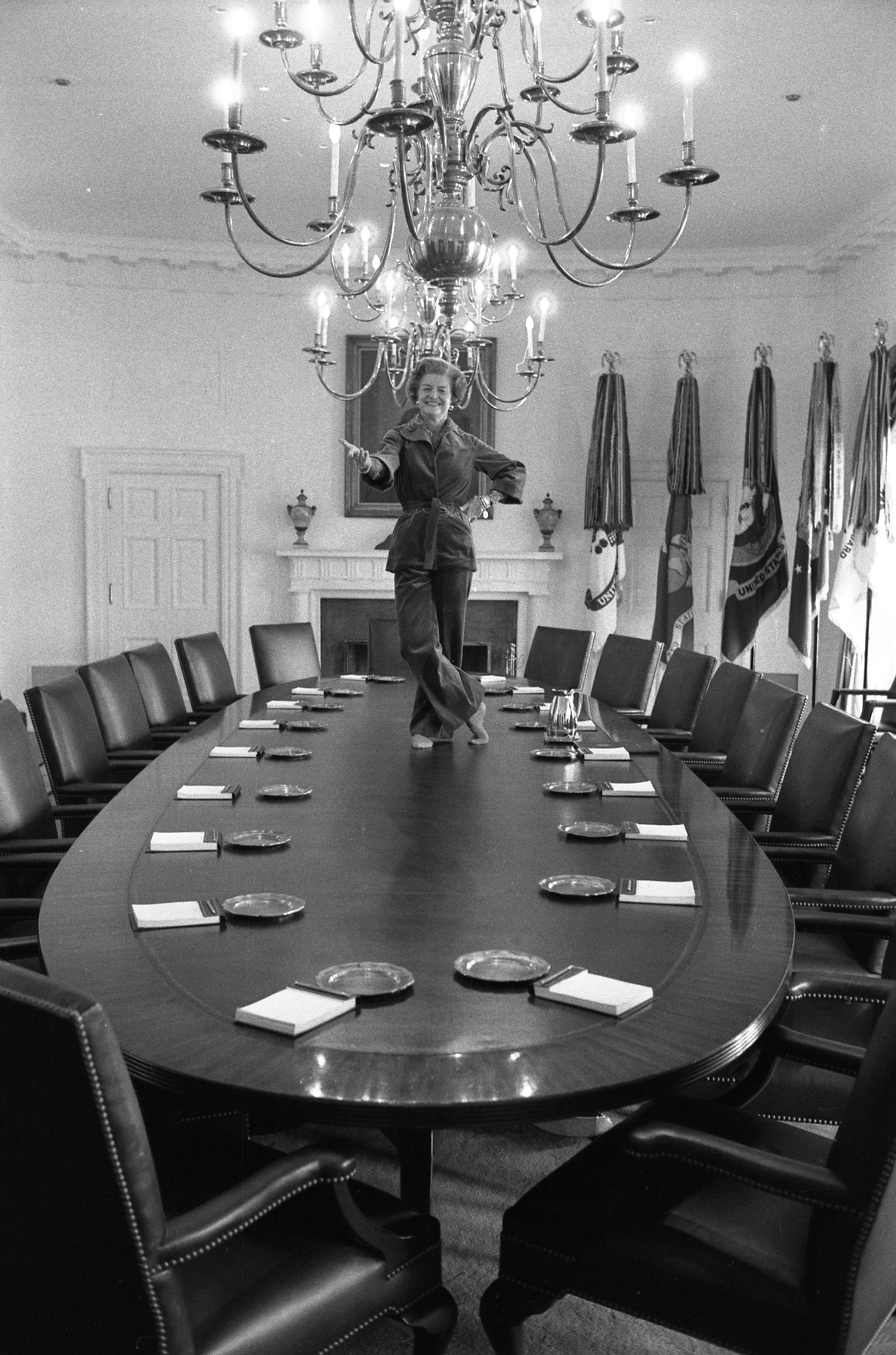
Photograph of Ford dancing on the table of the Cabinet Room

During the period after the election, Ford postponed scheduled plans to give her slated successor, Rosalynn Carter, a tour of the White House. Unknown to Carter at the time, this was likely due to Ford's fragility caused by her prescription drug abuse. When Ford attempted to postpone the plans a second time, President-elect Carter called the White House and threatened to make a fuss in the news if the tour was not held as planned. Ford capitulated and gave a brief, but cordial, tour of the White House to Rosalynn Carter on November 22, 1976, coinciding with President-elect Carter's White House meeting with President Ford.

On January 19, 1977, her last full day as first lady, Betty Ford used her training as a Martha Graham dancer to jump up on the Cabinet Room table. White House photographer David Hume Kennerly took a photo of her on the table. Gerald Ford did not know about or see the photo until 1994. A Ford family friend said that President Ford "about fell off his chair" when he saw the photo for the first time. The photo was subsequently published and is regarded as an "iconic" photograph of Ford's time as First Lady. Kennerly has touted the image as both capturing Ford's personality and being a symbolic image showing the feminist first lady posing in what had been a space occupied predominantly by white men.

Additional images
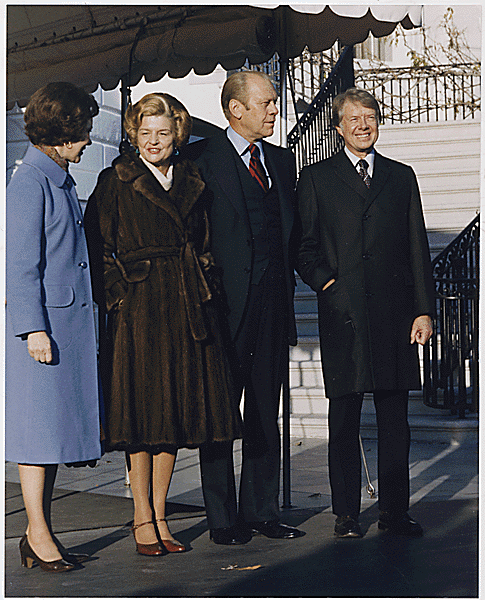
The Fords welcome President-elect Jimmy Carter and his wife Rosalynn Carter to the White House on November 22, 1976, during the presidential transition.

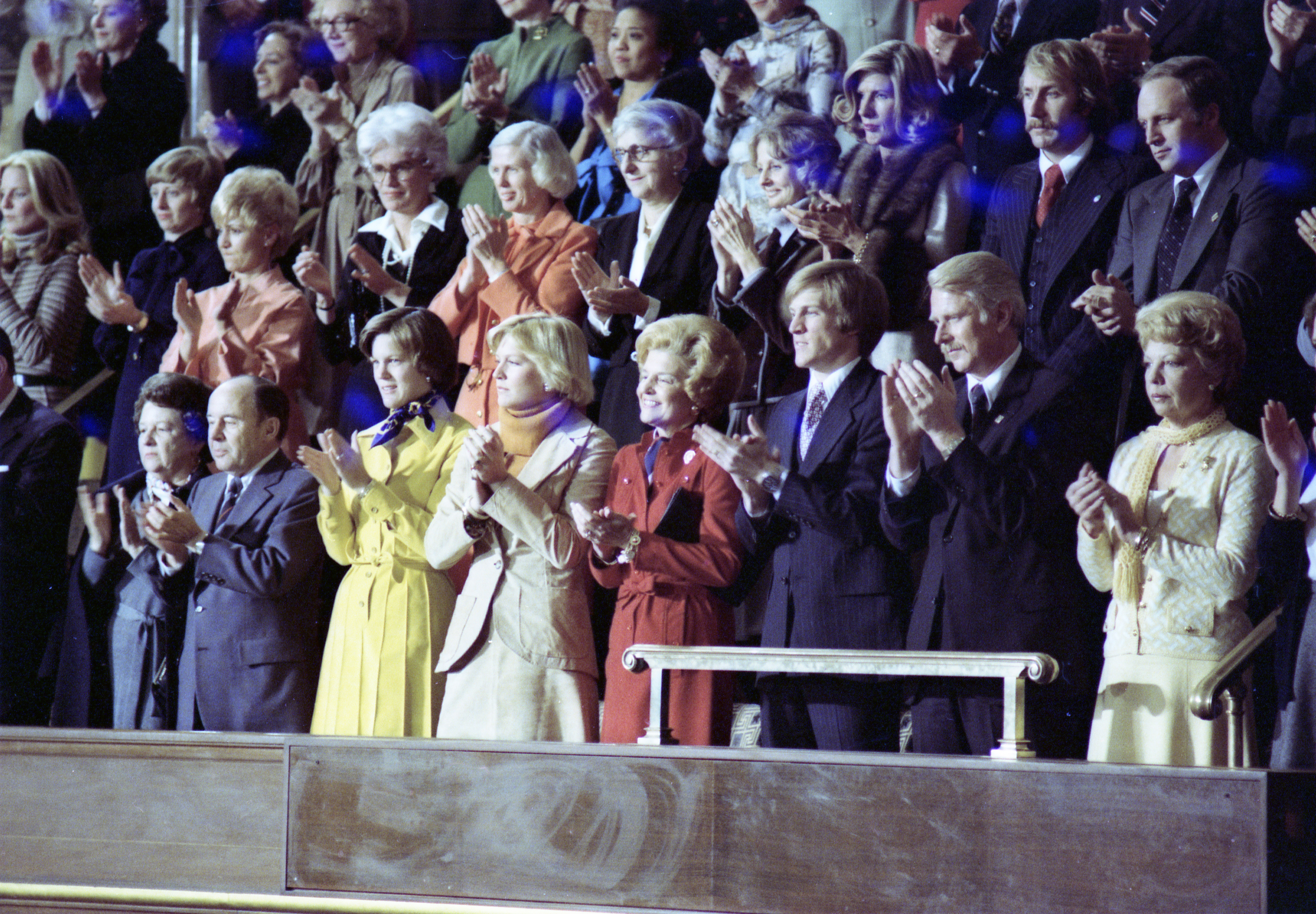
Ford and others applaud in the gallery during the 1977 State of the Union Address on January 12, 1977.

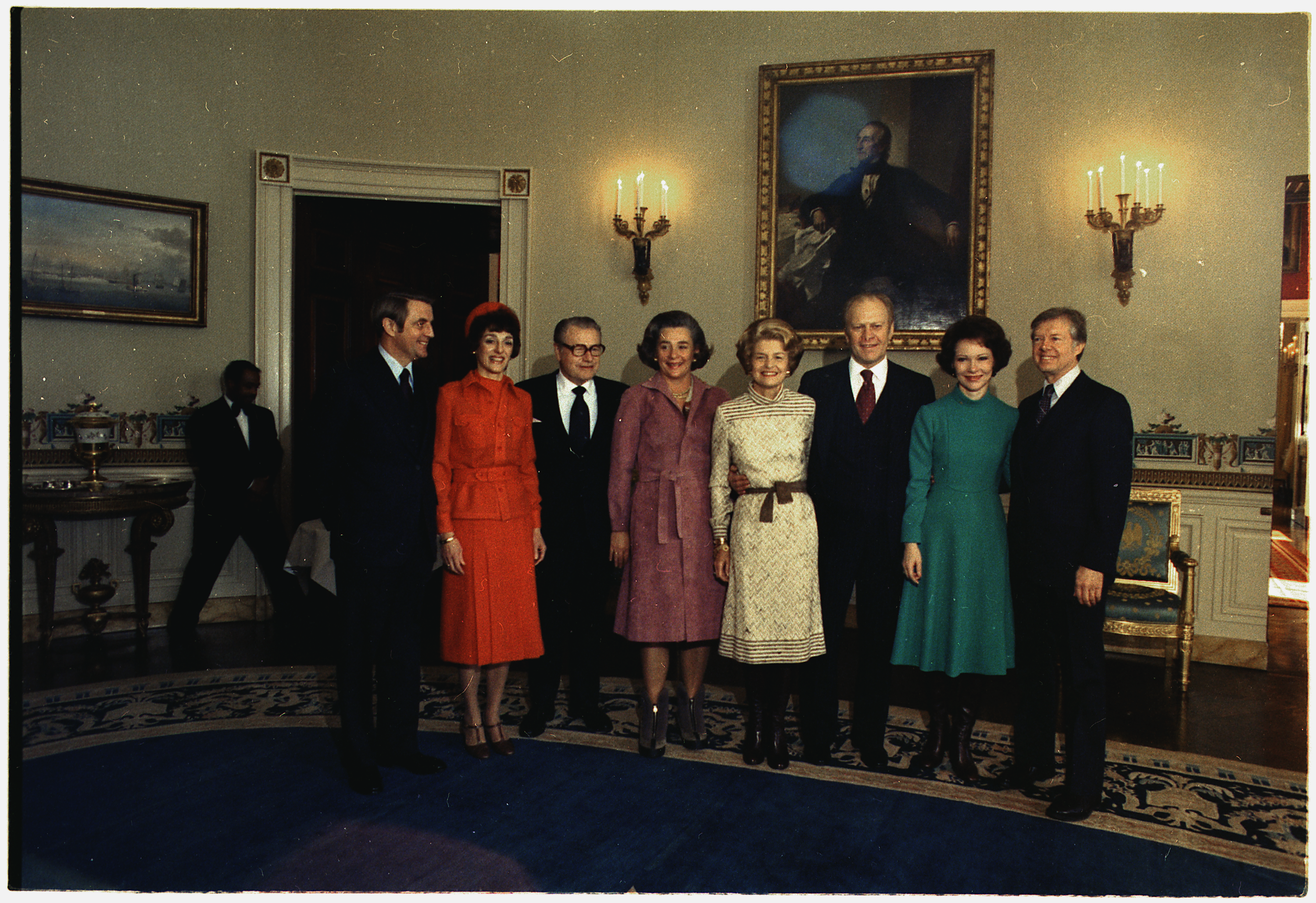
The incoming and outgoing first and second couples pose for a photograph at the White House on the day of the inauguration of Jimmy Carter. L-R: Vice President-elect Walter Mondale, incoming second lady Joan Mondale, outgoing Vice President Nelson Rockefeller, outgoing second lady Happy Rockefeller, Betty Ford, Gerald Ford, incoming first lady Rosalynn Carter, and President-elect Carter

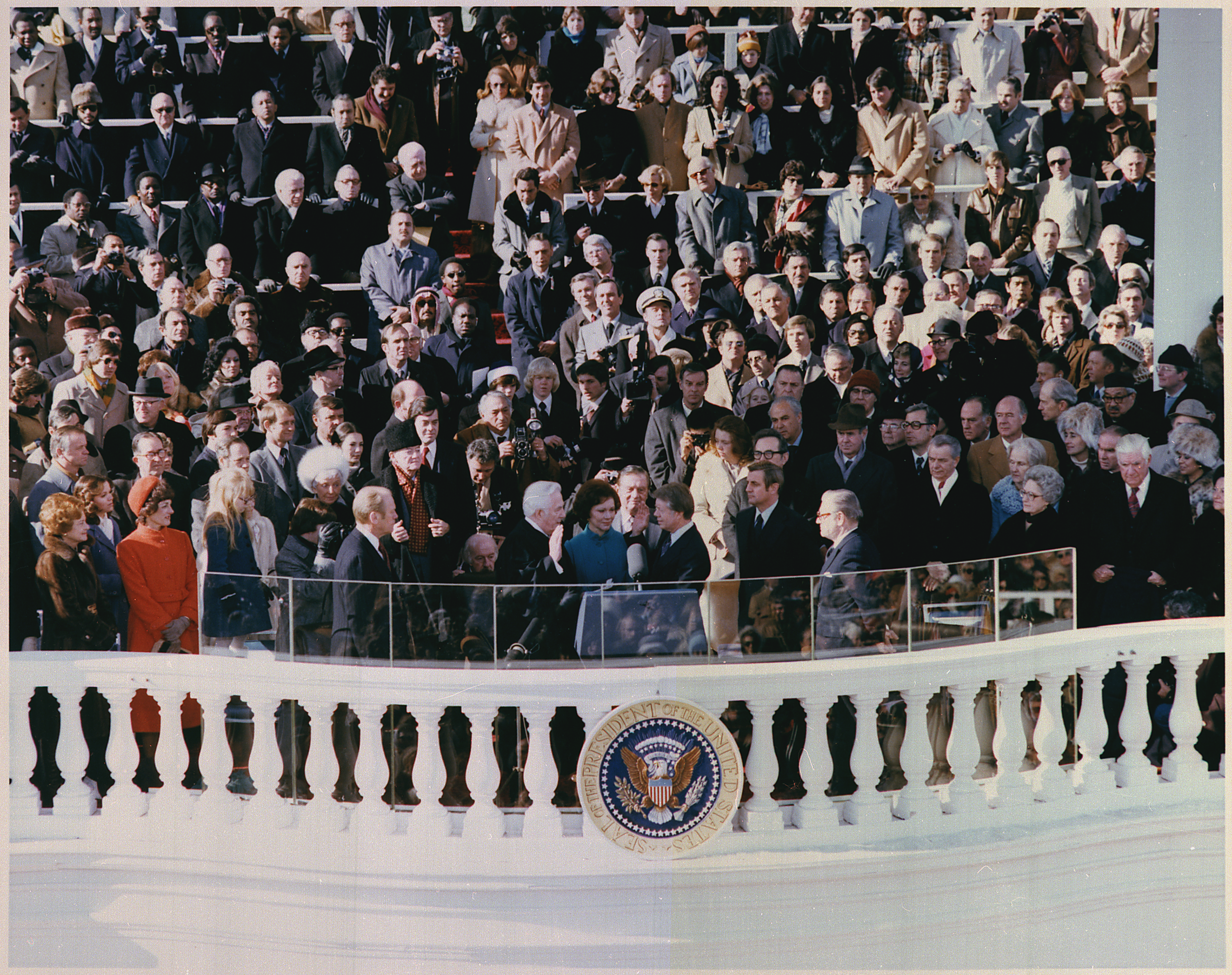
At his inauguration, Jimmy Carter takes the oath of office to succeed Gerald Ford as president. Betty Ford stands in the lower-left corner of this image.

== Post–White House life and career (1977–2011) ==
After leaving the White House in 1977, Ford continued to lead an active public life. In addition to founding the Betty Ford Center, she remained active in women's issues, taking on numerous speaking engagements and lending her name to charities for fundraising. Many of Ford's most significant contributions as an activist came following the Fords' departure from the White House.

In 1977, the Fords moved to Rancho Mirage, California.

In March 1977, Ford signed with NBC News to appear in two news specials within the following two years and to serve as a contributor to Today, and jointly signed a publishing deal alongside her husband for the rights to their forthcoming memoirs. In June 1977, Ford was a speaker at the Arthritis Association Convention. In September of that year, Ford traveled to Moscow for a television program taping and to serve as hostess for The Nutcracker. In November 1977, Ford appeared at the opening session of the National Women's Conference in Houston, Texas.

=== Recovery from alcoholism and prescription drug addiction ===
Ford had suffered from a dependency on prescription medication and from alcoholism prior even to her husband's presidency. She had, particularly, become addicted to prescription medication (opioid analgesics) that she had been originally prescribed in the early 1960s to treat a pinched nerve. Ford took doses of this medication in excess of her prescription. In her 1987 memoir, she reflected on these addictions, writing, "I liked alcohol, it made me feel warm. And I loved pills. They took away my tension and my pain". The fact that Ford had, for years, been given tranquilizers to treat a pinched nerve in her neck was public knowledge as far back as her time as second lady. During her time as first lady, there had even been some private speculation that Ford might have been suffering from substance abuse, as her friends and members of the press had observed occasional slurred speech from Ford.

After the Fords left the White House, her addictions became more evident to her family and appeared life-threatening. On April 1, 1978, her family staged an intervention. In order to be at Betty Ford's intervention, President Ford had made last minute cancellations of numerous appearances that he had been scheduled to make on the East Coast. In making these cancellations, the former president cited "personal and family reasons". The intervention forced Betty Ford to acknowledge the negative impact that her addiction was having on her health and family relationships. She agreed that day to detox from her medicine. She also, ultimately, agreed to attend rehab at the Naval Regional Medical Center in Long Beach, California. Ford registered herself at the hospital on April 11, 1978.

As she had previously been with her breast cancer diagnosis and treatment, Ford was transparent with the public about her addictions and admittance to rehab. Her transparency was praised by experts in drug abuse treatment, who predicted that it would make a major and positive impact towards removing social stigmas. The week she entered rehab, Ford disclosed her addiction to prescription medication. Days later, Ford also disclosed to the public that she had come to realize that she was additionally an alcoholic. She disclosed her alcoholism through a statement that a family spokesman read on her behalf at a press conference (at which Ford was not herself present) held outside of the hospital. In this statement, Ford disclosed, "I have found I am not only addicted to the medication I have been taking for my arthritis, but also to alcohol". In this statement, she also praised the reputation of the hospital's addiction treatment program, and declared her pleasure to have the opportunity to attend the treatment. The statement also declared, "I expect this treatment and fellowship to be a solution for my problems. I embrace it, not only for me, but all the many others who are here to participate." The Washington Post reported that Ford's disclosure of alcoholism came as a surprise to a number of her close friends, who had regarded her as merely a social drinker and were oblivious to her drinking problem.

Ford succeeded in getting sober. She published her first memoir, The Times of My Life, later in 1978 in which she wrote about her battle with addiction.

During a January 1984 address in Michigan to a crowd of individuals who were in the early stages of alcohol and drug dependency treatment, Ford reflected that the six years since she began her treatment for alcohol and drug abuse, "have been the best years in my life from the standpoint of feeling healthier and feeling more comfortable with myself".

=== The Betty Ford Center ===
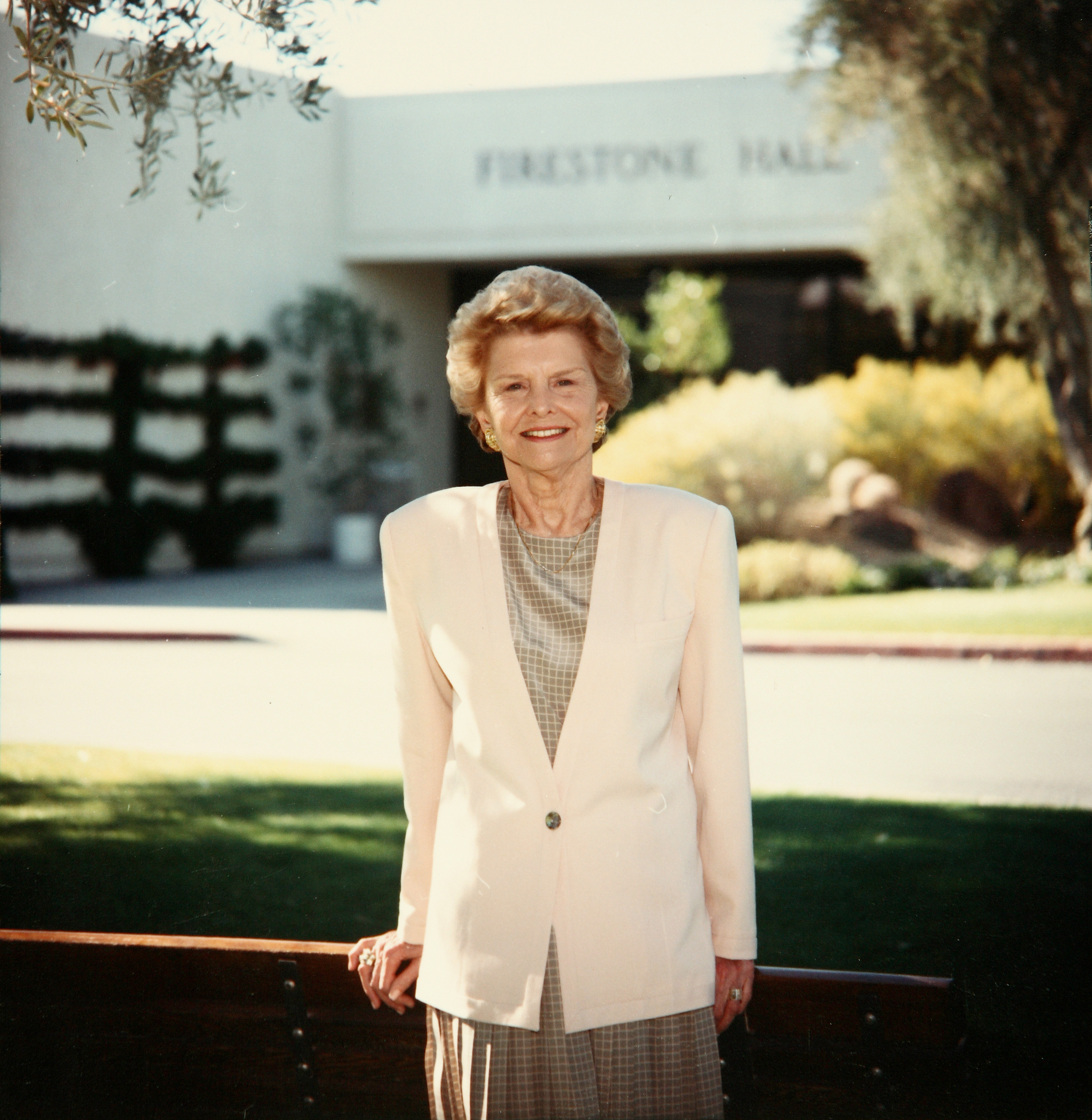
Photograph of Ford standing outside of the Betty Ford Center

In 1982, after recovering from her own addictions, Ford established the Betty Ford Center (initially called the Betty Ford Clinic) in Rancho Mirage, California. Its mission specializes in the treatment of chemical dependency, including treating the children of alcoholics. She partnered with her friend Ambassador Leonard Firestone to found it. She served as chair of the board of directors. She also co-authored with Chris Chase a book about her treatment, Betty: A Glad Awakening (1987). In 2003, Ford produced another book, Healing and Hope: Six Women from the Betty Ford Center Share Their Powerful Journeys of Addiction and Recovery. In 2005, Ford relinquished her chair of the center's board of directors to her daughter Susan. She had held the top post at the center since its founding.

Barbara Bush, a later first lady, opined that Ford, after discovering she was dependent on drugs, "transformed her pain into something great for the common good. Because she suffered, there will be more healing. Because of her grief, there will be more joy."

=== Women's movement ===
Ford continued to be an active leader and activist of the feminist movement after the Ford administration. She continued to strongly advocate and lobby politicians and state legislatures for passage of the ERA. In 1977, President Jimmy Carter appointed Ford to the second National Commission on the Observance of International Women's Year (the first had been appointed by President Ford). That same year, she joined First Ladies Lady Bird Johnson and Rosalynn Carter to open and participate in the National Women's Conference in Houston, Texas, where she endorsed measures in the convention's National Plan of Action, a report sent to the state legislatures, the U.S. Congress, and the President on how to improve the status of American women. Ford continued to be an outspoken supporter of equal pay for women, breast cancer awareness, and the ERA throughout her life. She was an active member of the Junior League.

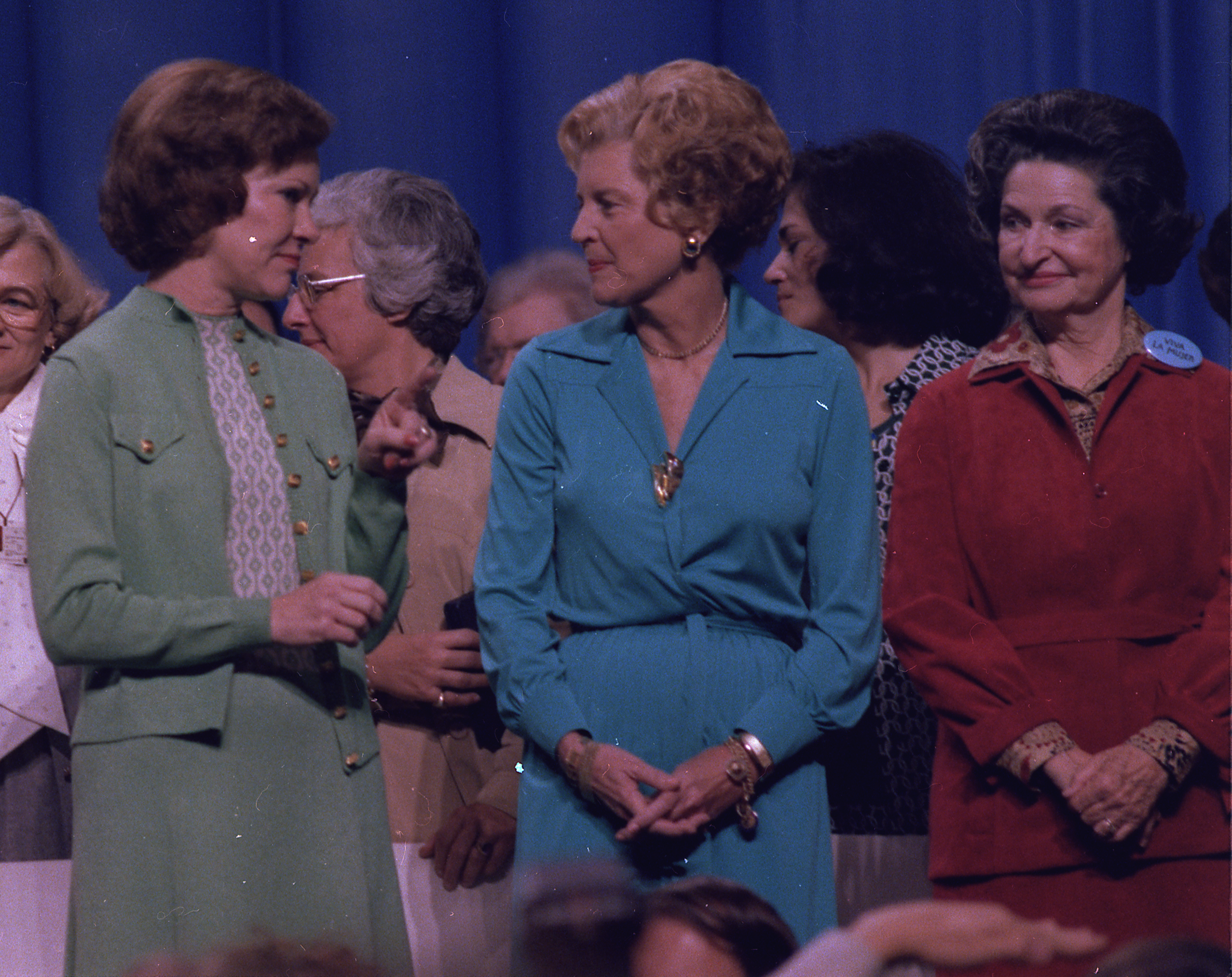
Ford (center) together at the 1977 National Women's Conference with First Lady Rosalynn Carter (left) and fellow former first lady Lady Bird Johnson (right)

Ford continued to advocate for the ratification of the ERA. In November 1977, Ford and First Lady Rosalynn Carter joined to advocate for its ratification at the National Women's Conference in Houston. In 1978, the deadline for ratification of the ERA was extended from 1979 to 1982, resulting largely from a march of a hundred thousand people on Pennsylvania Avenue in Washington. The march was led by prominent feminist leaders, including Ford, Bella Abzug, Elizabeth Chittick, Betty Friedan and Gloria Steinem. In 1981, Eleanor Smeal, the National Organization for Women's president, announced Ford's appointment to be the co-chair, with Alan Alda, of the ERA Countdown Campaign. In November 1981, Ford stated that Governor of Illinois James R. Thompson had not done enough in support of the ERA as well as her disappointment with First Lady Nancy Reagan not being in favor of the measure, though also relayed her hopes to change the incumbent First Lady's mind in further encounters with her. As the deadline approached, Ford led marches, parades and rallies for the ERA with other feminists, including First Daughter Maureen Reagan and various Hollywood actors. Ford was credited with rejuvenating the ERA movement and inspiring more women to continue working for the ERA. She visited states, including Illinois, where ratification was believed to have the most realistic chance of passing. On October 12, 1981, Ford spoke in support of the ERA on a rally held at the National Mall. The amendment did not receive enough states' ratification. In 2004, Ford reaffirmed her pro-abortion rights stance and her support for the 1973 U.S. Supreme Court decision in Roe v. Wade, as well as her belief in and support for the ratification of the ERA.

=== Other matters ===
In late 1978, Ford underwent a facelift procedure. She was publicly transparent about this cosmetic surgery.

Ford involved herself with the American Cancer Society and the Arthritis Foundation.

Decades later, in his 2014 memoir, television producer Norman Lear revealed that in the late-1970s Ford had played a significant role in helping to persuade television executives to purchase the syndication rights to the series Maude, of which she was an avid viewer. He wrote that, at his request, Ford had attended the National Association of Television Program Executives convention and spoke to executives about her love of the series to help pique their interest in the series.

Ford tackled the stigmatized issue of HIV/AIDS during the HIV/AIDS crisis. Through the work she did at the Betty Ford Center, Ford recognized the connection between drug abuse and the contraction of AIDS. She involved herself in the Los Angeles AIDS Project. In 1985, Ford received the Los Angeles AIDS Projects "Commitment to Life Award". Her acceptance speech spoke hopefully of the prospect that attitudes towards HIV/AIDS would shift, being de-stigmatized as cancer and alcoholism had (in part due to her contribution). When she attended the 1992 Republican National Convention, Ford wore an AIDS ribbon pin.

Ford supported gay and lesbian causes, speaking against discrimination in the United States military. In 1993, Ford was quoted as speaking against existing bans on gays serving in the military, remarking,

Constitutionally all citizens have the right to serve their country as long as they abide by the rules and regulations of military service. There have been gays and lesbians serving our country for many years. There haven't been any more problems than there have been in situations like Tailhook with heterosexuals. I do not believe they should be asked to leave the military.

In 1987, Ford underwent quadruple coronary bypass surgery and recovered without complications.

In 1985, Ford received the Award for Greatest Public Service Benefiting the Disadvantaged, an annual award given by the Jefferson Awards. That same year, Ford received the Golden Plate Award of the American Academy of Achievement. This was formally presented to her by President Ford, who was an Academy Awards Council member. In 1987, Ford was inducted into the Michigan Women's Hall of Fame. On November 18, 1991, she was awarded the Presidential Medal of Freedom by President George H. W. Bush. In 1999, she and President Ford were jointly awarded Congressional Gold Medals. That same year, a Golden Palm Star on the Palm Springs Walk of Stars was dedicated to her and her husband. In 2000, the Lasker Foundation awarded Ford its annual Mary Woodard Lasker Public Service Award. On May 8, 2003, Ford received the Woodrow Wilson Award in Los Angeles for her public service, awarded by the Woodrow Wilson Center of the Smithsonian Institution.

In the early 1990s, Ford voiced admiration for First Lady Hillary Clinton and praised her for taking an active role in policy within her husband's administration by leading the Clinton health care plan

During her and President Ford's later years together, they resided in Rancho Mirage and in Beaver Creek, Colorado. President Ford died, aged 93, of heart failure on December 26, 2006, at their Rancho Mirage home. Despite her advanced age and frail physical condition, Ford traveled across the country and took part in the funeral events in California, Washington, D.C., and Michigan. Following her husband's death, Ford continued to live in Rancho Mirage. Poor health and increasing frailty due to operations in August 2006 and April 2007 for blood clots in her legs caused her to largely curtail her public life. Ill health prevented Ford from attending the funeral of former First Lady Lady Bird Johnson's in July 2007, and her daughter Susan Ford Bales instead represented her at the funeral service.

Gallery of images
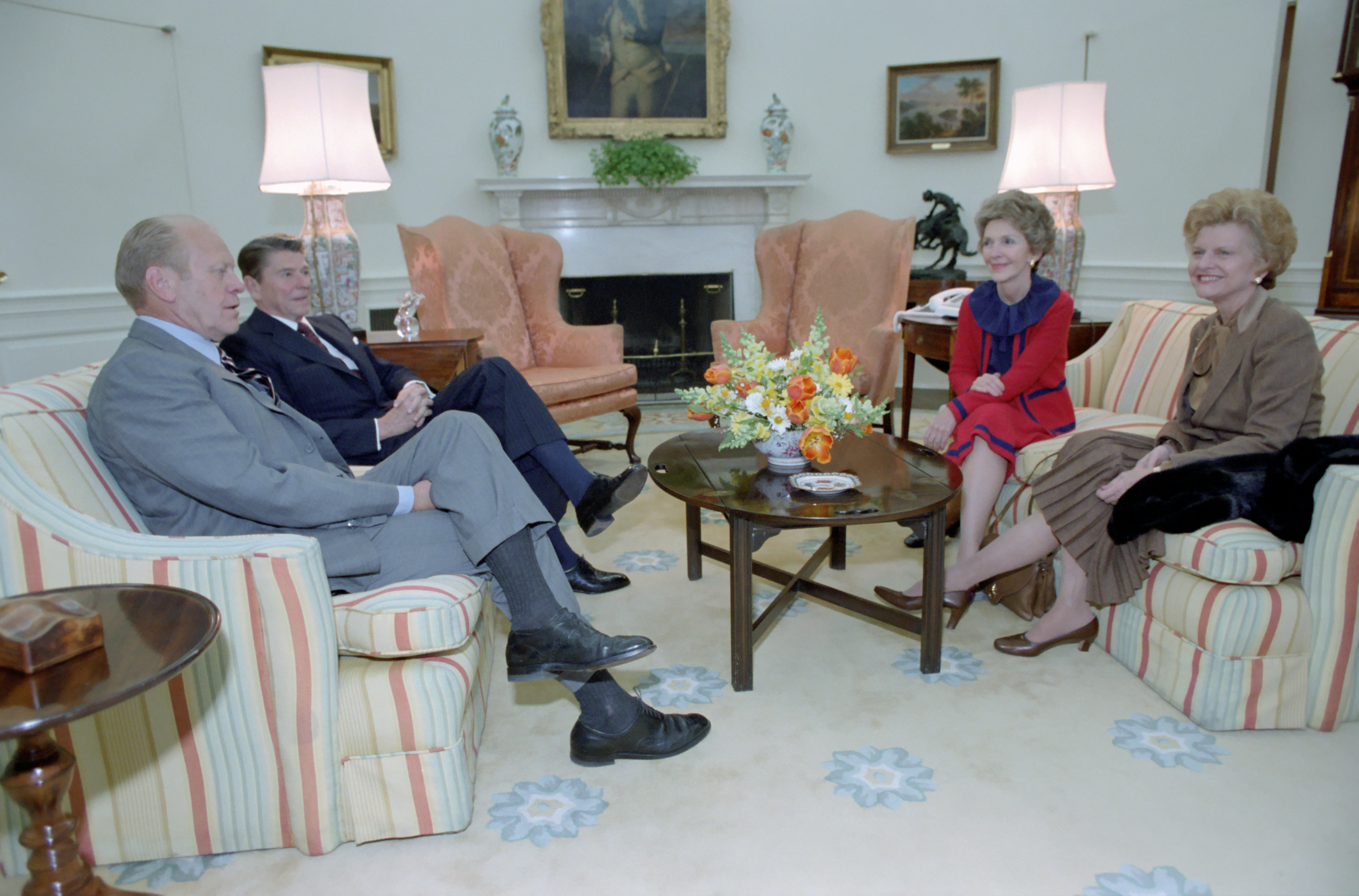
The Fords meeting with President Ronald Reagan and First Lady Nancy Reagan in the White House Oval Office in March 1981

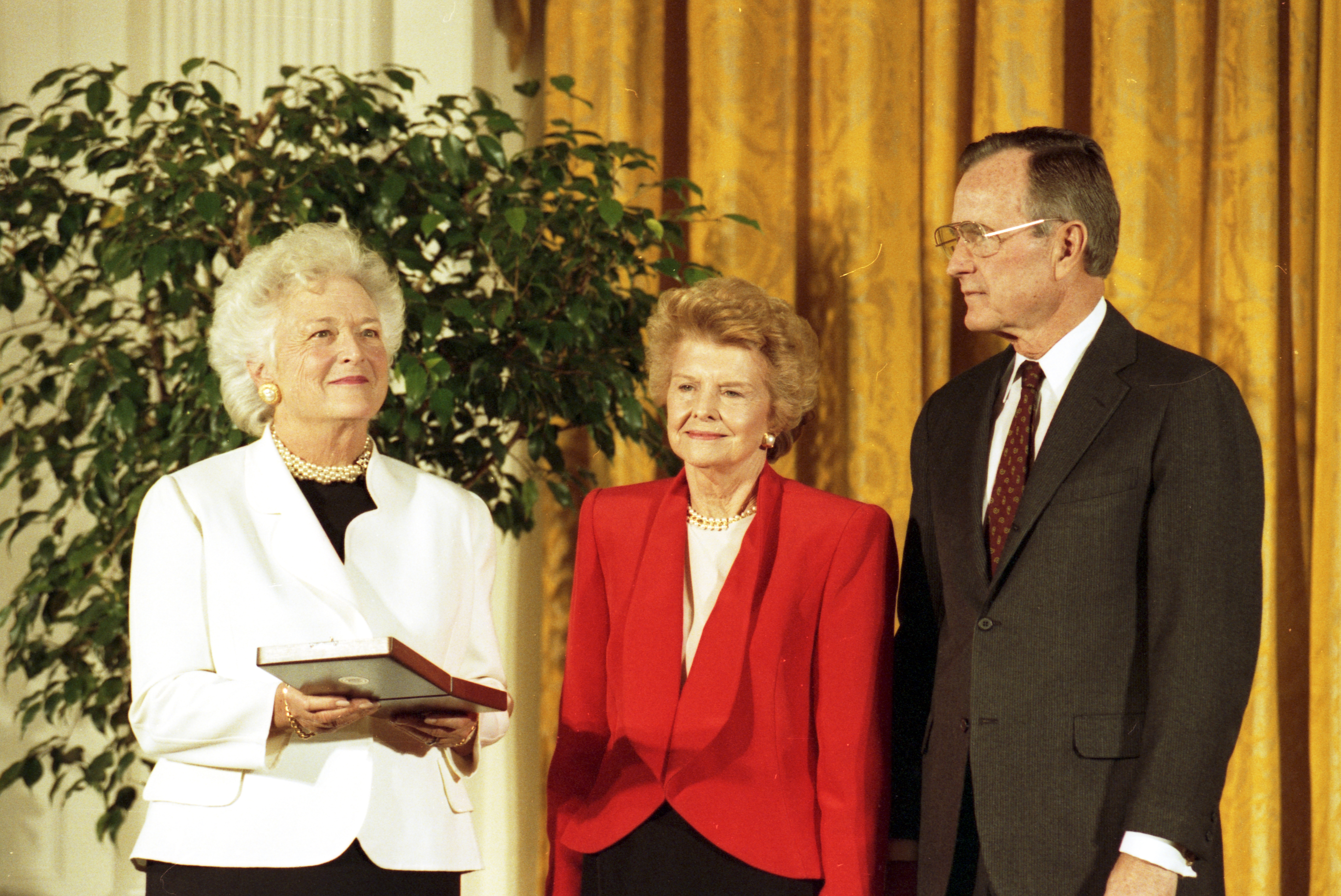
Betty Ford being awarded the nation's highest civilian honor, the Presidential Medal of Freedom, by President George H. W. Bush, 1991. First Lady Barbara Bush is holding the medal.

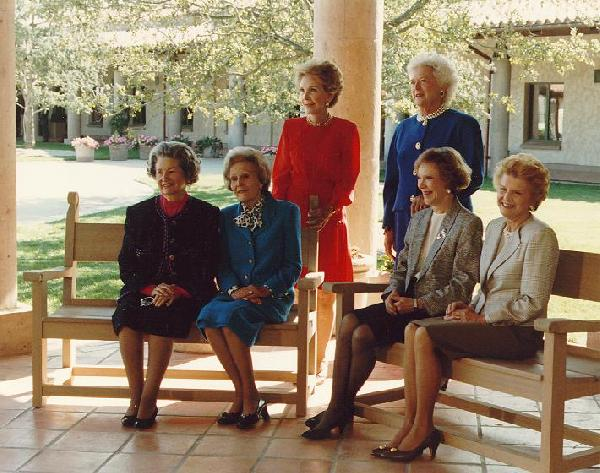
Ford with other U.S. First Ladies at the November 1991 opening of the Ronald Reagan Presidential Library. Seated (l–r): Lady Bird Johnson, Pat Nixon, Rosalynn Carter, Ford; Standing (l–r): Nancy Reagan, Barbara Bush

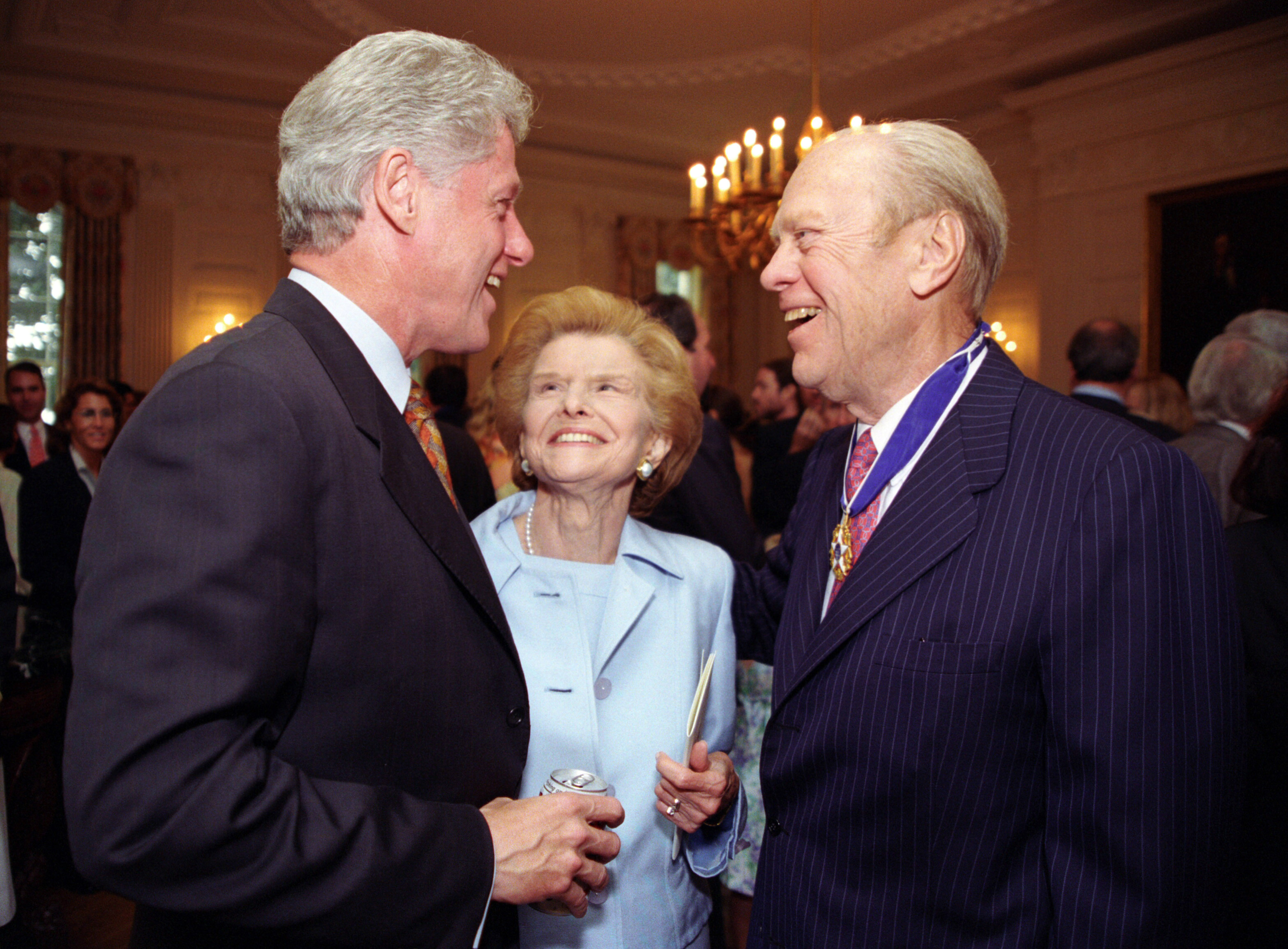
President Bill Clinton speaking with the Fords at the White House ceremony awarding the at a 1999 Presidential Medal of Freedom ceremony

Ford with other U.S. First Ladies at the 1994 National Garden Gala, which was themed "A Tribune to America's First Ladies". L–R: Nancy Reagan, Ladybird Johnson, Hillary Clinton, Rosalynn Carter, Ford, Barbara Bush

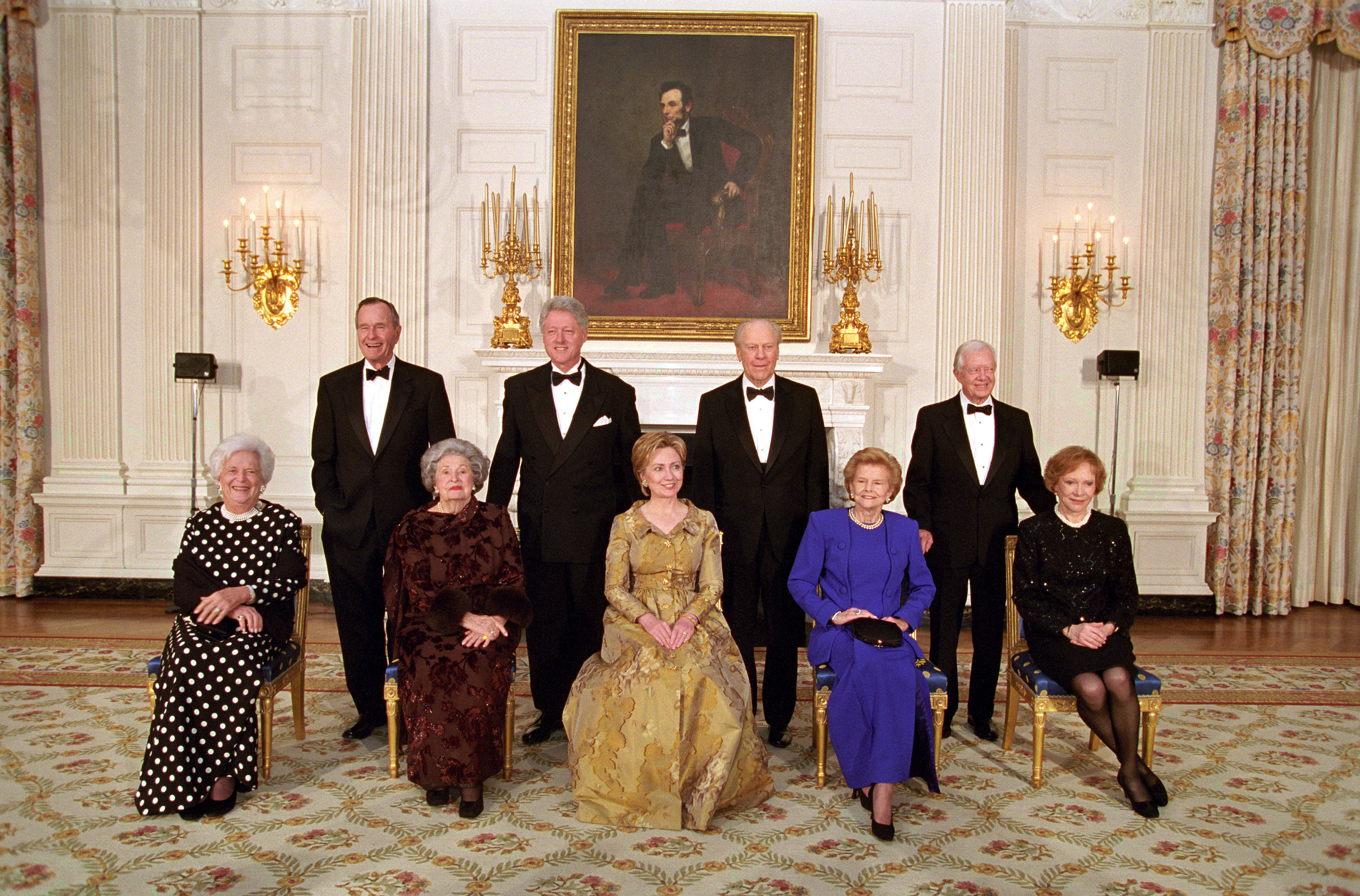
The Fords posing for a photograph with three other U.S. first couples (George H. W. and Barbara Bush, Bill and Hillary Clinton, Jimmy and Rosalynn Carter) as well as former first lady Lady Bird Johnson during at the 2000 White House Historical Association Dinner

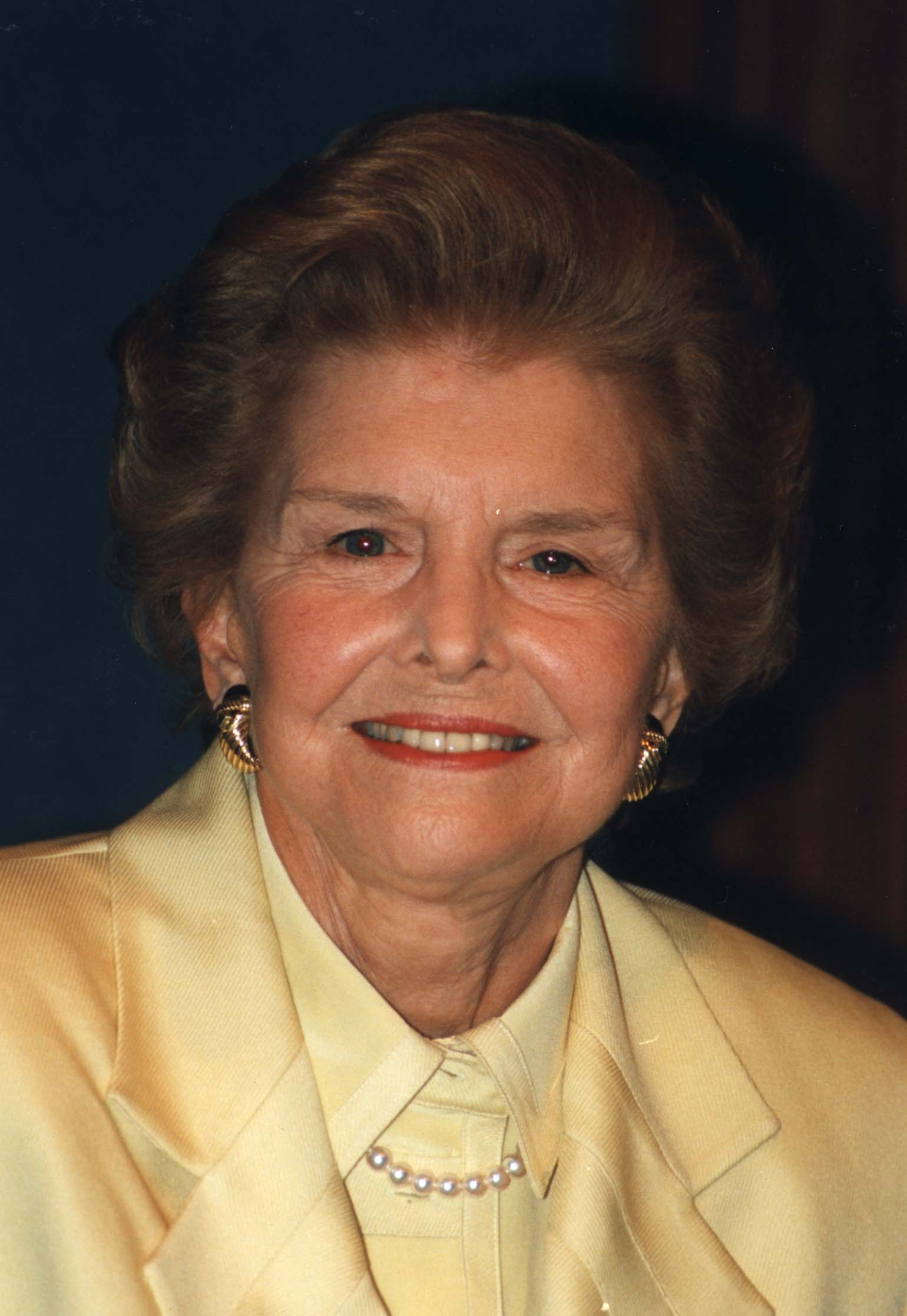
Ford attending a National Press Club event in 2001

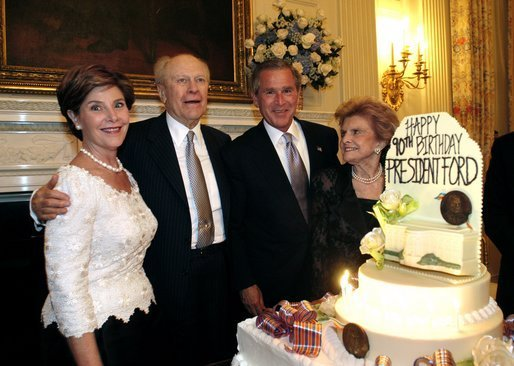
The Fords with President George W. Bush and First Lady Laura Bush at the White House in 2003 at a celebration President Ford's 90th birthday

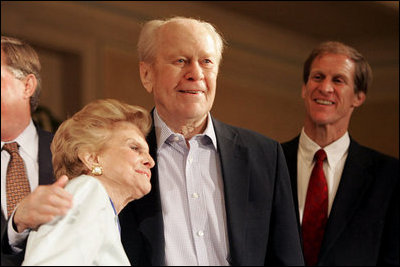
Ford and her husband at a June 2005 Gerald R. Ford Foundation dinner

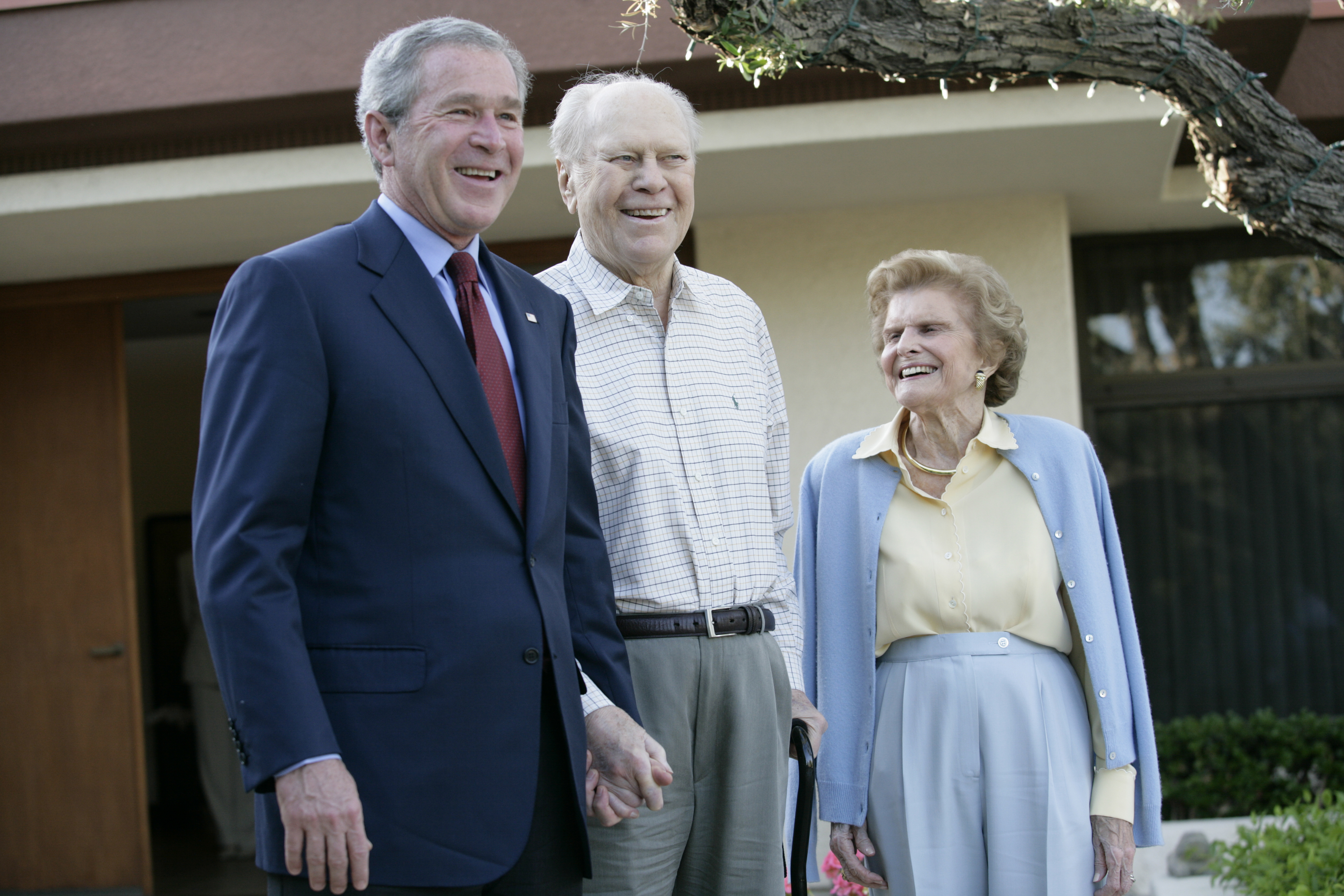
Betty Ford with her husband and President George W. Bush on April 23, 2006

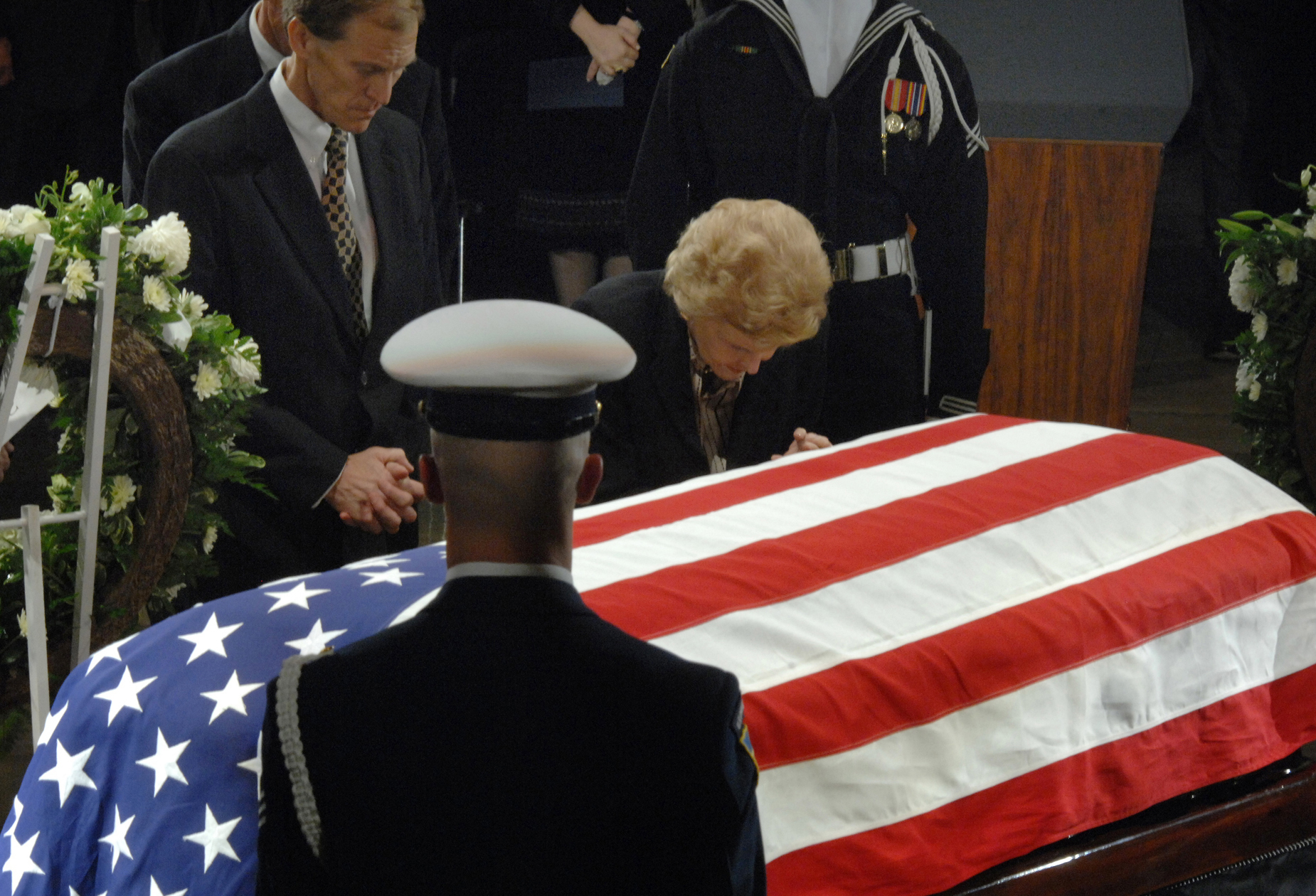
Ford leans over President Ford's coffin during memorial services for him held December 30, 2006 in the United States Capitol rotunda as part of his state funeral.

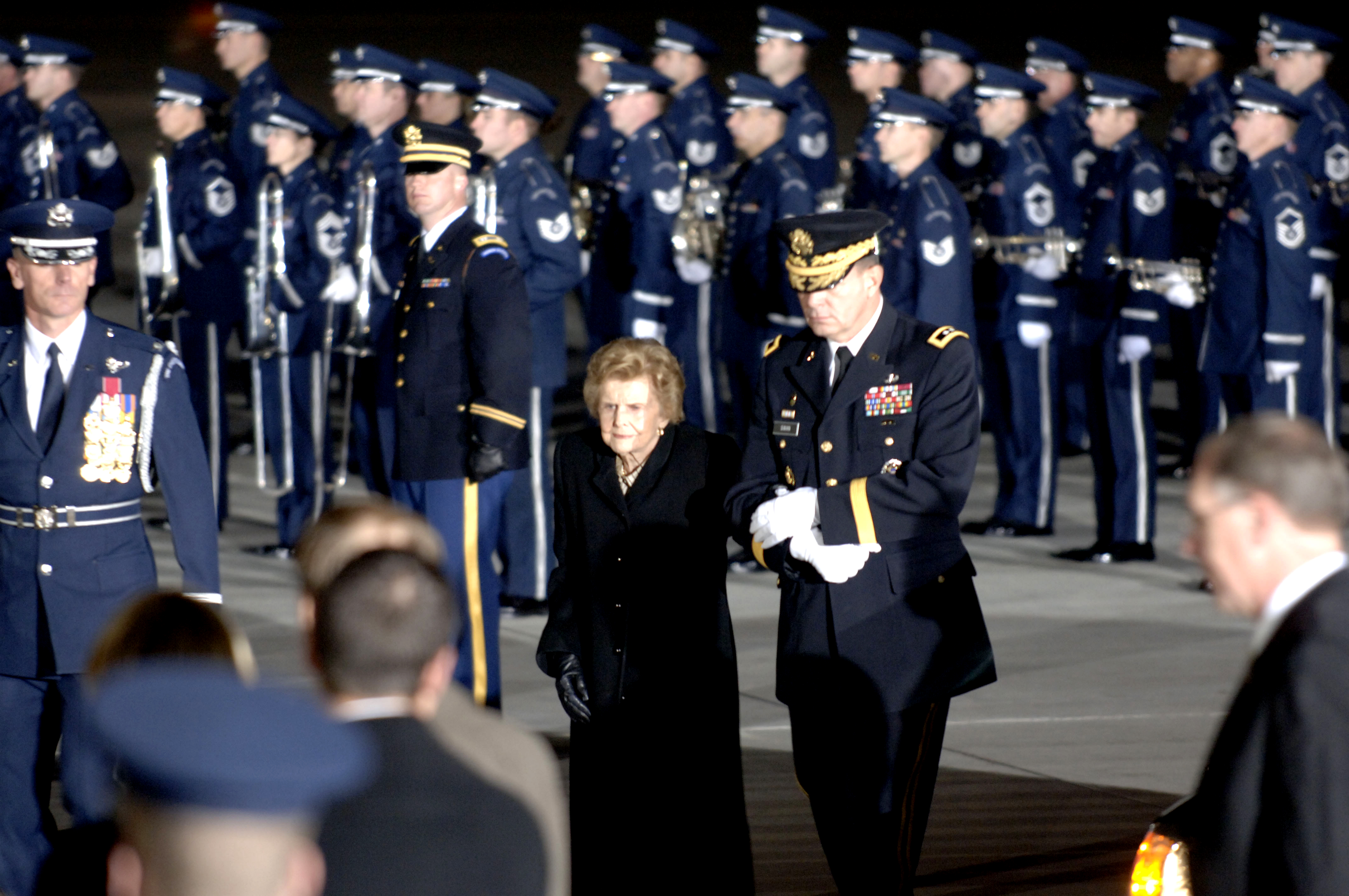
Ford being escorted by Army Major General Guy C. Swan III during a portion of the state funeral of her late husband

== Death and funeral ==
Burial site of Betty and Gerald Ford at the Gerald R. Ford Presidential Museum in Grand Rapids, Michigan

Betty Ford died of natural causes on July 8, 2011, at Eisenhower Medical Center in Rancho Mirage. She was 93. Ford left $500,000 to the Betty Ford Center.

Funeral services were held in Palm Desert, California, on July 12, 2011, with more than 800 people in attendance, including former president George W. Bush, then-first lady Michelle Obama, then-U.S secretary of state Hillary Clinton, herself a former first lady, former first ladies Rosalynn Carter, who gave a eulogy, and Nancy Reagan.

On July 14, a second service was held at Grace Episcopal Church in Grand Rapids, with eulogies given by Lynne Cheney, former Ford Museum director Richard Norton Smith, and Ford's son Steven. In attendance were former president Bill Clinton, former vice president Dick Cheney and former first lady Barbara Bush. In her remarks, Mrs. Cheney noted that July 14 would have been Gerald Ford's 98th birthday. After the service, Betty Ford was buried next to her husband on the museum grounds.

In July 2018, a statue of Ford was unveiled outside of the Gerald R. Ford Presidential Museum in Grand Rapids, Michigan.

== Historical assessments ==
According to John Robert Greene:

Only a part of Betty Ford's legacy will be that of her role as first lady. Throughout her post-Washington life, she established herself as one of the nation's first public advocates for women's self-examination, a prodigious fund-raiser for arthritis research, and, most important, a tireless campaigner for the rights and dignity of those afflicted with the disease of substance abuse. Her role as a public health advocate distinguishes her as one of the most influential women of the latter part of the twentieth century.

Since 1982 Siena College Research Institute has conducted occasional surveys asking historians to assess American first ladies according to a cumulative score on the independent criteria of their background, value to the country, intelligence, courage, accomplishments, integrity, leadership, being their own women, public image, and value to the president. Ford has consistently ranked among the top-nine most highly assessed first ladies in these surveys. In terms of cumulative assessment, Ford has been ranked:

- 6th-best of 42 in 1982
- 9th-best of 37 in 1993
- 8th-best of 38 in 2003
- 7th-best of 38 in 2008
- 8th-best of 39 in 2014
- 6th-best of 40 in 2020

The 2008 Siena Research Institute survey ranked Ford the 5th-highest of the twenty 20th and 21st century First Ladies. The 2008 survey also ranked Ford the 5th-highest in their assessment of first ladies who were "their own women" as well as 5th-highest in courage. In both the 1993 and 2003 Siena Research Institute surveys, Ford was similarly ranked the 5th-highest in historians' assessment of first ladies' courage. In supplementary questions asked during the 2014 Siena Research Institute survey, historians and scholars ranked Ford 3rd-highest among 20th and 21st century First Ladies in the greatness of post-White House service (with 16% ranking her as having had the best among all first ladies), 3rd-highest in advancement of women's issues (with 19% ranking her as having done the best), and 4th-highest in creating a lasting legacy (with 10% of respondents ranking her as having done the best). In the 2014 Siena Research Institute survey, Ford and her husband were ranked the 19th-highest out of 39 first couples in terms of being a "power couple". In supplementary questions asked in the 2020 survey, historians and scholars ranked Ford 4th-highest among 20th and 21st century First Ladies in the greatness of post-White House service (with 10% ranking her as having had the best among all first ladies) and 4th-highest in advancement of women's issues (with 18% ranking her as having done the best). They also ranked her work on women's rights as the third-most effective signature initiatives among those of the first ladies between 1964 and 2020.

In 2021, Zogby Analytics conducted a poll in which a sample of the American public was asked to assess the greatness of twelve First Ladies from Jacqueline Kennedy onwards. The American public ranked Ford as the eighth-greatest among these first ladies.

== Cultural depictions ==
Ford's life is the focus of the 1987 ABC biographical television film The Betty Ford Story, which has a story adapted from her memoir The Times of My Life. Gena Rowlands won both an Emmy Award and a Golden Globe Award for her portrayal of Ford. Ford is one of three former first ladies whose lives are the focus of Showtime's 2022 series The First Lady, in which she is portrayed by Kristine Froseth and Michelle Pfeiffer.

Ford was among the many celebrities featured on the cover art of the 1978 comic book Superman vs. Muhammad Ali.

== Awards and honors ==
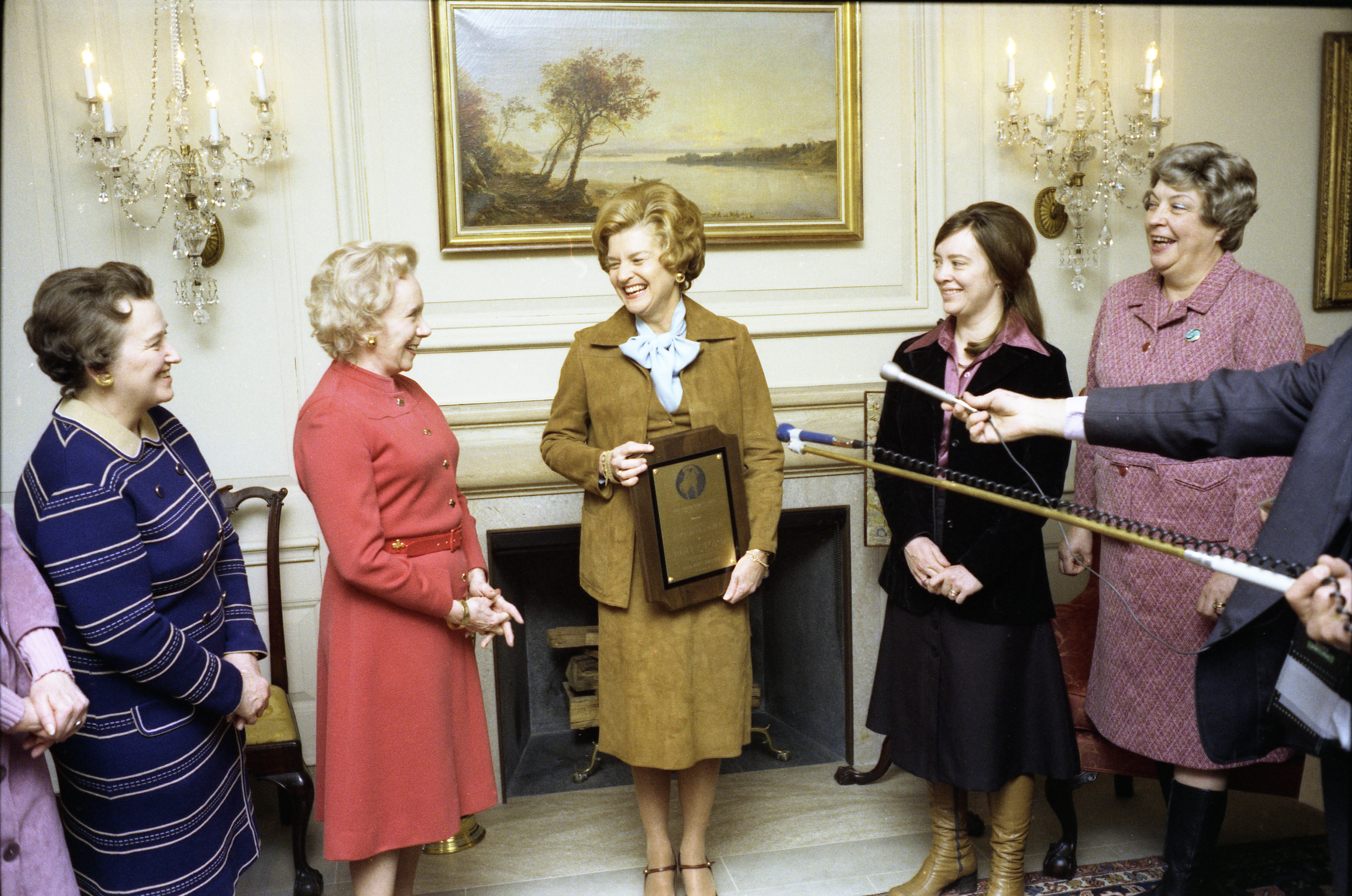
The National Woman's Party presents Ford with a plaque honoring her as its inaugural "Alice Paul Award" in the White House's Map Room on January 11, 1977 (the 92nd birthday of Alice Paul).

In 1975, when Time named "American women" as its "Time Person of the Year", the magazine profiled Ford as one of eleven women selected to represent "American women".

Other honors and awards include:

- 1975 National Woman's Party "Alice Paul Award"
- 1975 Philadelphia Association for Retarded Citizens "Humanitarian Award"
- 1975 National Art Association "Distinguished Woman of the Year Award"
- 1975 Anti-Defamation League Women's Division "Rita V. Tishman Human Relations Award"
- 1975 Florists' Transworld Delivery "Golden Rose Award"
- Order of the Pleiades (awarded in 1975 by Shah Mohammad Reza Pahlavi of Iran)
- 1976 Parsons Annual Critics Awards Show "Parsons Award" (an award given to individuals that, "not only advance the cause of American fashion, but in doing so serve as an inspiration for students who are about to assume professional and citizenship roles in American society.")
- 1976 honorary Doctor of Laws from the University of Michigan
- 1978 Eleanor Roosevelt Humanities Award
- 1981 Friends of Hebrew University "Scopus Award"
- 1982 American Cancer Society "Hubert Humphrey Inspirational Award"
- 1983 Susan G. Komen Foundation "Komen Foundation Award"
- 1984 National Arthritis Foundation "Charles B. Harding Award"
- 1985 Jefferson Awards for Public Service "Award for Greatest Public Service Benefiting the Disadvantaged"
- 1985 American Academy of Achievement "Golden Plate Award"
- 1985 AIDS Project Los Angeles "Commitment to Life Award"
- 1986 National Council on Alcoholism "Golden Key Award"
- Inducted into the Michigan Women's Hall of Fame in 1987
- 1987 International Center for the Disabled "Freedom of Human Spirit Award"
- 1988 College of Communication at the University of Texas "McGovern Distinguished Leadership Award"
- Presidential Medal of Freedom (awarded in 1991 by President George H. W. Bush)
- 1991 International Women's Forum "Hall of Fame Award"
- 1995 Samaritan Institute "National Samaritan Award"
- 1995 Columbia Hospital for Women "Breast Cancer Awareness Lifetime Achievement Award"
- 1995 Center on Addiction and Substance Abuse "Distinguished Service Award"
- 1996 Bob Hope Classic Ball awardee
- 1997 American Institute for Public Service "Jefferson Award"
- 1997 Michigan Women's Foundation "Women of Achievement & Courage" award
- 1997 Women's International Center "Living Legacy Award"
- 1998 Common Wealth Award of Distinguished Service
- 1998 Ronald McDonald House Charities "Award of Excellence"
- Congressional Gold Medal in 1999 (jointly awarded to Betty and Gerald Ford)
- Golden Palm Star on the Palm Springs Walk of Stars (jointly awarded to Betty and Gerald Ford in 1999)
- 1999 American Hospital Association "C. Everett Koop Health Award"
- 2000 Lasker Foundation Mary Woodard Lasker Public Service Award
- 2003 Smithsonian Institution Woodrow Wilson Center "Woodrow Wilson Award"
- National Women's Hall of Fame (inducted posthumously in 2013)
- 2024 United States Postal Service commemorative postage stamp

=== Things and places named for Ford ===
- Betty Ford Cancer Research Center at Cedars-Sinai Hospital in Los Angeles, California (named after Ford in 1978)
- Betty Ford Center for Comprehensive Breast Diagnosis at Columbia Hospital for Women in Washington, D.C. (named for Ford in 1980; hospital now defunct)
- Betty Ford Alpine Gardens in Vail, Colorado
- Susan G. Komen Foundation "Betty Ford Award" (formerly known as the "Women Foundation Award")

== Books authored ==
- Ford, Betty; Chase, Chris (1978). The Times of My Life. New York City, New York: Harper & Row. ISBN 978-0-06-011298-1.
- Ford, Betty; Chase, Chris (1987). Betty, a Glad Awakening. Garden City, New York: Doubleday. ISBN 978-0-385-23502-0.
- Ford, Betty; Betty Ford Center (2003). Healing and Hope: Six Women from the Betty Ford Center Share Their Powerful Journeys of Addiction and Recovery. New York City, New York: Putnam (Penguin Group). ISBN 978-0-399-15138-5.

== See also ==
- List of breast cancer patients according to occupation
- List of first ladies of the United States
- Second-wave feminism

Honorary titles
Vacant Title last held by Judy Agnew	Second Lady of the United States; 1973–1974	Vacant Title next held by Happy Rockefeller
Preceded by Pat Nixon	First Lady of the United States; 1974–1977	Succeeded by Rosalynn Carter
Preceded by first	Chairwoman of Betty Ford Center; 1982–2005	Succeeded by Susan Ford Bales
