= Leah Novick =

Leah Novick (born 1932) is a Renewal rabbi and the second oldest woman rabbi in the United States. She lives in Carmel, California.

She graduated from Brooklyn College and also earned a master's degree in public policy. She worked as a social science researcher when her three children were young. In the late 1950s, she was part of in sit-ins and lie-ins to integrate Westchester, Pennsylvania's swimming pools. Later she moved to Westchester County, New York, where she helped organize Jewish groups to attend the 1963 March on Washington. She ran unsuccessfully for the New York state Legislature in 1970 and moved to Washington to work as chief aide for Bella Abzug. In 1977, she helped to coordinate the National Commission on the Observance of International Women's Year. In 1978, she worked as a guest professor at Stanford. During much of the 1980s she taught at U C Berkeley's graduate school of public policy.

Novick was a founding member of OHALAH: Association of Rabbis for Jewish Renewal. She was ordained as a Jewish Renewal rabbi in 1987.

She is the author of the book "On the Wings of Shekhinah" Rediscovering Judaism's Divine Feminine (Quest Books 2008). As of 2013 she serves as president of the educational non-profit Spirit of the Earth.
