= Jill Ruckelshaus =

American feminist activist

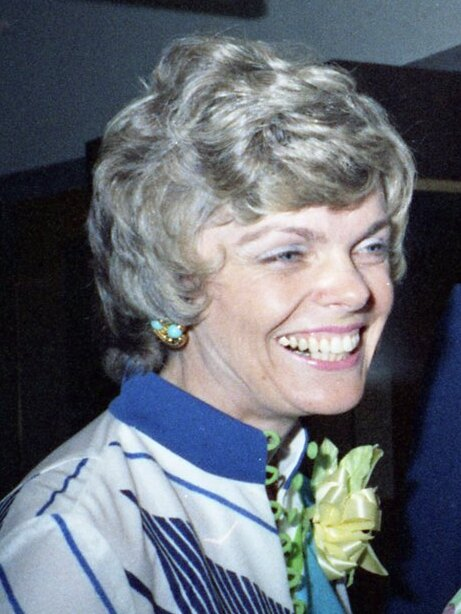
- Ruckelshaus in 1975

Personal details
- Born: Jill Elizabeth Strickland; February 19, 1937 (age 89) Indianapolis, Indiana, U.S.
- Party: Republican
- Spouse: William Ruckelshaus (m. 1962–2019)
- Children: 3
- Education: Indiana University, Bloomington (BA); Harvard University (MA)

Jill Elizabeth Ruckelshaus (née Strickland; born 1937) is a former special White House assistant and head of the White House Office of Women's Programs and a feminist activist. She also served as a commissioner for the United States Commission on Civil Rights in the early 1980s. Currently, she is a director for the Costco Wholesale Corporation.

Ruckelshaus is known for her role as a leading Republican advocate for feminist policies, such as the Equal Rights Amendment and women's reproductive choice, during the peak of political influence for second-wave feminism in the United States. For this, she was referred to as the "Gloria Steinem of the Republican Party" for her outspoken positions on women's issues. Her role in the movement, portrayed by Elizabeth Banks, was dramatized in the Mrs. America miniseries, with the sixth episode of the series in her name.

== Political career ==
Ruckelshaus was born and grew up in Indianapolis, Indiana. She is a graduate of Indiana University, where she obtained her undergraduate degree, and also of Harvard University, where she received a master's degree in English.

The couple's national political career started in 1968, where Ruckelshaus's husband, William Ruckelshaus, ran against incumbent senator Birch Bayh in the United States Senate election of that year. In the following year, he was appointed as a U.S. Assistant Attorney General in the Civil Rights division by President Richard Nixon. With this appointment, the couple moved together to Washington, D.C., with their family.

She was one of the founding members of the National Women's Political Caucus in 1971, and one of its most prominent Republican members. She would serve as the NWPC spokesperson to the 1972 Republican National Convention. Through the convention, she was influential in the adoption of a women's rights plank in the party's 1972 platform.

=== White House appointments ===
Following the 1972 presidential election, Ruckelshaus served as an assistant to Anne Armstrong and head of the White House Office of Women's Programs. She resigned in 1974, having been part of the White House staff for a little more than a year.

She was later appointed by President Gerald Ford as presiding officer of the National Commission on the Observance of International Women's Year in 1975. In this capacity, she was a leading advocate for congressional funding that would support the 1977 National Women's Conference. She was also one of the four representatives in the U.S. Delegation to the United Nations World Conference of the International Women's Year in Mexico City, which was from June 19 to July 2, in 1975. She resigned from her position as presiding officer in June 1976 as her family moved to Washington state, remaining as an ordinary member for the rest of the year.

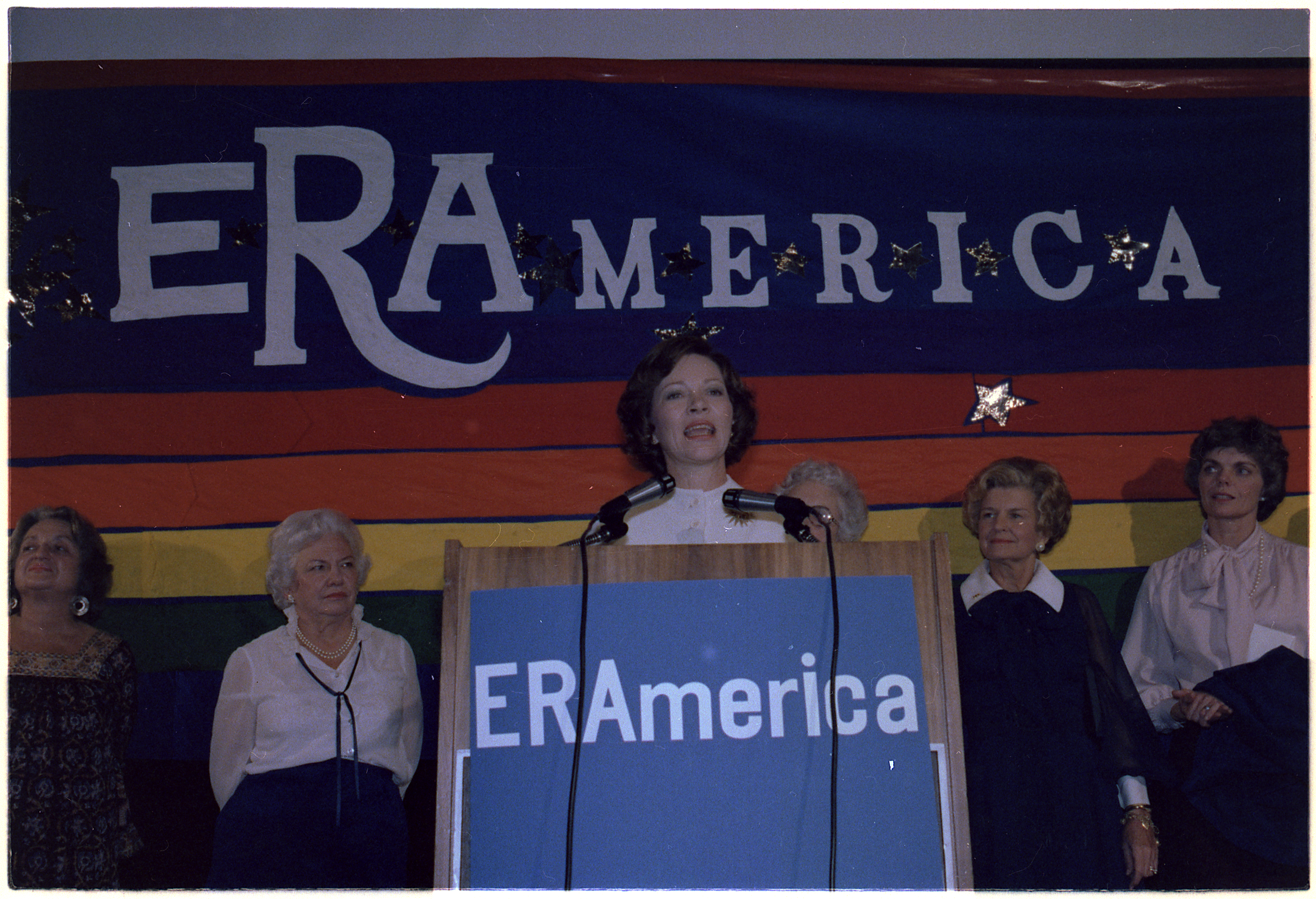
First Lady Rosalynn Carter speaks during ERAmerica fundraiser gala during 1977 Conference. Ruckelshaus is pictured far right.

=== National Women's Conference ===
She attended the 1977 National Women's Conference in Houston as the former presiding officer of the commission that would be the organizing body of the conference. Although part of the organizing committee for the Washington State Conference for Women and a candidate for national delegate, she withdrew her nomination during the state conference before voting began. Her participation included leading delegates in a collective pledge from the opening ceremonies. She was photographed by Diana Mara Henry as part of her participation in the conference.

After the conference, she was named as one of the members of the President's National Advisory Committee for Women, co-chaired by Bella Abzug and Carmen Delgado Votaw. She, along with 24 other members, resigned from the committee in January 1979 in response to Abzug's firing.

=== Civil Rights Commissioner ===
In 1980, she was appointed as a commissioner for the United States Commission on Civil Rights by President Jimmy Carter. As a Republican appointee by a Democratic president, she was one of the few to survive an initial challenge to her position, with President Reagan nominating a replacement in 1982. This nominee would ultimately not be taken up by Congress for approval. As a member of the commission, she joined the majority membership frequently criticizing the administration's positions on women and minority groups.

She would hold the position through late 1983. While it was anticipated that her term on the commission would be extended, she was ultimately replaced in that year. In a 2005 interview, she alleged this was because of her moderate political views. Indeed, in an internal White House memo, she was characterized as a "thorn" for the administration, given her popular support in Congress and her critical position of the administration's policies. As part of a negotiated deal to reform the Civil Rights Commission, the membership moved from congressional approval of presidential nominees to an even split of four presidential appointees and four congressional appointees. While some had expected Ruckelshaus to be named as one of the congressional appointees by the House Minority Leader (then a Republican), she was not put forward for renomination along with fellow Republican feminist Mary Louise Smith.

Within a month of her replacement and the reconstitution of the commission, the new members would reverse previous positions held by the old membership on affirmative action and would become substantially more susceptible to the political whims of the presidency.

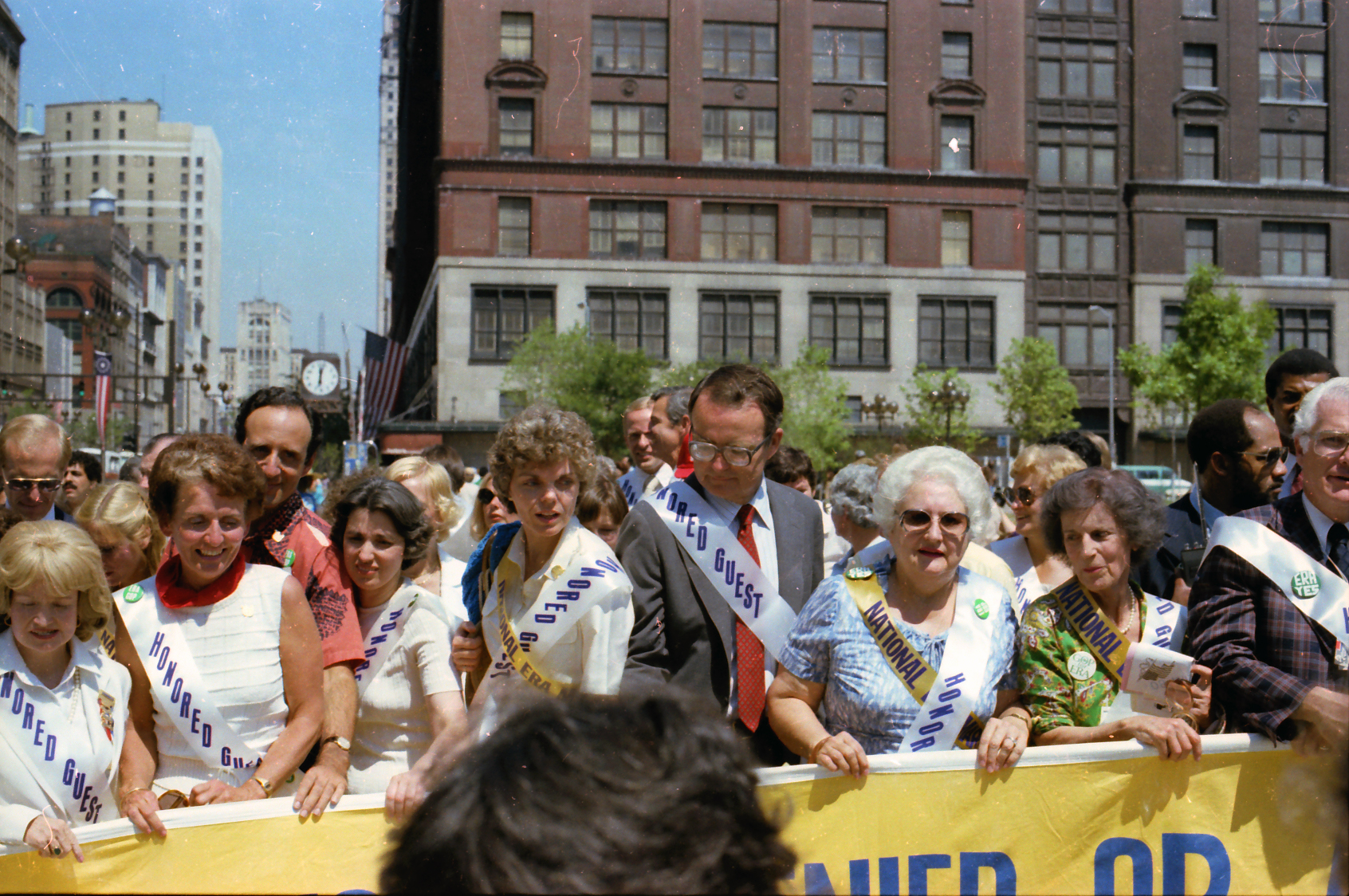
Ruckelshaus (front row, fourth from left) helps lead Pro-ERA march during 1980 Republican National Convention

=== Last stand on Equal Rights Amendment ===
She attended the 1980 Republican National Convention in Detroit, leading a march of roughly 4,500 supporters of the Equal Rights Amendment to rally for the Republican Party's reaffirmation of support for the proposed amendment. Although unsuccessful in preserving her party's support for the ERA, she was part of a group of feminist women Republicans who secured a private commitment from then-nominee Ronald Reagan to appoint the first woman to the Supreme Court of the United States. A year later into his presidency, Sandra Day O'Connor was appointed to join the court.

== Personal life ==
She married William Ruckelshaus in 1962, and they raised five children together, including two from William's previous marriage.

== Portrayal in popular media ==
Ruckelshaus is a main character in the 2020 FX on Hulu mini-series, Mrs. America, where she is portrayed by Elizabeth Banks. Her character is used as the centerpoint for the Republican Party's transition from a party generally supportive of issues like the ratification of the Equal Rights Amendment to a more socially conservative position, influenced in part by Phyllis Schlafly's campaigning on the ERA and other Evangelical Christian factions, such as the Moral Majority, that become more dominant political forces. This transition is featured in the sixth episode of the series, titled "Jill" after Ruckelshaus.
