= Diana Mara Henry =

American journalist (born 1948)

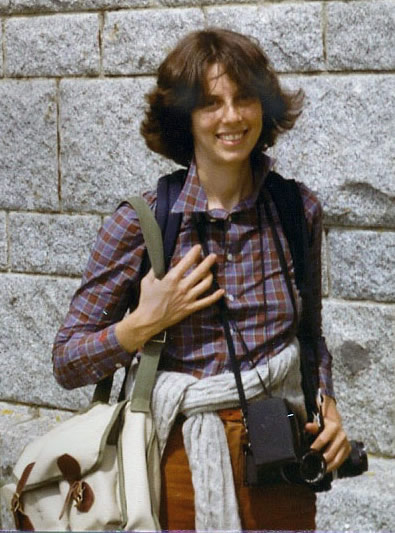
- Henry in 1980
- Born: June 20, 1948 (age 78); Cincinnati, Ohio, U.S.
- Occupations: Photographer, photojournalist
- Website: http://www.dianamarahenry.com

Diana Mara Henry (born June 20, 1948, in Cincinnati, Ohio) is an American freelance photographer and photojournalist.

== Biography ==
=== Early life and education ===
After attending Miss Doherty's College Preparatory School for Girls in Cincinnati, Henry entered the Lycée Français de New York where she pursued the Classique course of studies including six years of Latin and four years of Greek. During the summer of 1963 she stayed for several weeks with the family of Georges Simenon at their Chateau d'Echandens. Admitted a year early to Radcliffe College, she received Harvard's Ferguson History Prize (1967) for her sophomore essay, "The Concept of Time and History", published that same year in the Foundation for the study of Cycles Cycles Magazine, Vol XVII, pages 67,68,69. In the summer of 1968, she worked at publicity assistant on location for the David Wolper production of the film If It's Tuesday, This Must Be Belgium. She received her A.B. in Government from Harvard University in 1969.

Before turning to photography full-time in 1971, she worked as a researcher for the NBC News documentary, From Here to the Seventies, in 1969, and as a general assignment reporter, news and features, for the Staten Island Advance, a Newhouse daily, in 1970.

=== Introduction to photography ===
Henry followed her father Carl Henry's path to Harvard College, from which he graduated in 1934. He gave her daughter her first camera, an Ansco Pioneer, when she was three years old and had himself been a filmmaker of his family's European travels in 1927 and 1929. Together they attended avant-garde film showings at the Cincinnati Museums and viewed North By Northwest multiple times. Henry's mother, Edith E. Henry, was a handbag and shoe designer. Henry began her career in photojournalism at Radcliffe College, as photo editor of the Harvard Crimson from 1967 to 1969. Her photography was also published during that time in Harvard Alumni Bulletin, the Harvard Lampoon Overkill Number, Brian Kahin's student film Barbara Baby (starring Barbara Lanckton Connors), The Boston Globe, Harvard Today, and Time magazine.

Her first paid assignments were for Dana Hall School and were published in the Dana Hall Bulletin Vols. 30 and 31. She illustrated the "Clean for Gene" (McCarthy) campaign pro bono. She also wrote feature and news articles for the Crimson about Jerry Rubin and Frank Bardacke and the Boston Black Panther Party and "Probing Antioch College's Novel Psyche"

=== Legacy ===
Diana Mara Henry first set foot at the Alice Austen House in 1970, when she was writing a feature article for the Staten Island Advance, the NYC borough's Newhouse daily newspaper for which she was working as a General Assignment reporter.

The house was in disrepair and deteriorated further over the years, as DMH researched the work of the owner (1866–1952) for whom it is named, pioneering photographer E. Alice Austen. Diana Mara Henry, who had left the Advance to take up a career in photography, wanted to produce a book of famous women photographers to inspire and encourage young women to adopt the profession by offering them role models of other daring and accomplished women in the field. Upon discovering that Ann Novotny was preparing a book to be entitled Alice's World, Henry contacted her and joined The Friends of Alice Austen. The group undertook to place a marker in a ceremony at Alice Austen's gravesite and, after Ann Novotny's demise, to have a Staten Island ferry named in her honor. Henry's documentation of the condition of the house and the progress of the restoration were included in the Historic Structures Report that preceded and accompanied the saving of the house. The Alice Austen House, also named Clear Comfort, became a NYC Landmark when, as Vice-President of the Friends of the Alice Austen House, under the leadership of Margaret Riggs Buckwalter, Diana Mara Henry lobbied successfully for the city to grant $1,025,000 to restore the house and open it as a museum. Now a National Historic Landmark, the house was inducted in 2002 into the National Trust for Historic Preservation's highly selective group of Historic Artists' Homes and Studios.

Besides her photography of the Women's Movement, including paid assignments for the National Commission for the Observance of International Women's Year, Henry chose to photograph many events on her own initiative such as the Women's Pentagon Action in 1980 and the demonstration at The New York Times for the use of the term Ms in 1974, demonstration against decades-long sex experiments on cats at the Museum of Natural History, the 1977 strike at radio station WBAI against Pacifica, and other often obscure events and personalities that she considered historic and that would be unknown to this day without her visual testimony.

For the decade 1971–1981, she continued the reportage she had begun in 1970 with her feature articles about Ed Murphy, an early Vietnam Veterans Against the War leader, for the Staten Island Advance and photographed the Memorial Day demonstration at Boston Common and at Lexington and Concord in the days preceding. She continued on to photographing the hunger strike at the VA Hospital in Westwood. Ron Kovic was moved to write to her on July 25, 2010: "Your photos are beautiful and represent such a powerful and passionate time in American history. I believe these photos will last and many years from now they will be looked at and studied just as Mathew Brady's classic and haunting Civil war photos are today." For each of the events she photographed, she collected and preserved massive amounts of documentation in the form of leaflets, press releases, guest lists, personal monograph statements, and continued the conversations, documentation and publication of the ephemera through her website. This historic collection, along with the photographs, has found a home at the Du Bois Library of U Mass Amherst.

== Assignments, teaching, writing ==
In 1971, Henry began to learn the technical side of photography by working as an assistant at Steve Eisenberg's studio at 123 West 28th Street, and by starting to photograph one of her most enduring subjects: the anti-war movement, including a demonstration at the Internal Revenue Service "Don't Pay War Taxes."

One of Henry's first and most successful assignments was to photograph Elizabeth Holtzman on the Brooklyn Bridge for her primary campaign in 1972. Besides being used in the campaign literature, her photographs were published in Juris Doctor magazine and in the Congresswoman's autobiography, Who Said it Would be Easy? The Congresswoman credits Henry's photograph for helping her win her seat in Congress. That was the year Henry also began to photograph Bella Abzug, her most enduring friend and significant client. Henry's photographs were used in all the Congresswoman's subsequent campaigns for Senate and Mayor.

Henry's adventures with the George McGovern campaign, starting with getting on the press bus in New Hampshire and going through the convention in Miami Beach, at which she photographed a young Bill Clinton, are detailed in her book, Women on the Move. In her introduction to Henry's book, Professor Nancy C. Unger, author of Beyond Nature's Housekeepers: American Women in Environmental History (Oxford University Press) writes: "In Women on the Move, Diana Mara Henry's striking photographs bring to life the excitement, the tension, the joy, and the drama of this inspiring period in which anything seemed possible ... Through Henry's eyes, we see these women as heroic, but also deeply human. Her image of Eunice Shriver's careworn face in a pensive moment at the 1972 Democratic Convention reveals a profound beauty." Henry's photographs for Reliable Source in Miami illustrated articles including "The issue is more than women" by Gloria Steinem on October 7, 1972. Henry also became the staff photographer for the short-lived newspaper Brooklyn Today.

In 1973 she photographed James Brown in performance at Riker's Island at the behest of William Van den Heuvel. She began her annual report work with Camflo Mines that extended for the years 1974, 1975 and 1976, along with the sister company La Luz Mines in 1975 and 1976. In 1973 Henry also photographed Fashion Week at the Plaza for [More], later republished in the premier issue of a reborn Reliable Source and the Second A.J. Liebling (journalism) Counter Convention. Further assignments under Events, Subjects.

In 1973–1974, Henry returned to her alma mater to teach English at the Lycee Francais de New York, where Pierrette Fleutiaux asked her to teach photography to the teachers, her first photography teaching. In 1974, Henry volunteered at the International Center of Photography before it opened, and was then hired by Via Wynroth to attend to the Education program. Cornell Capa, founder of the ICP, then asked her to create and run the Community Workshop Program, in which she also taught black and white photography until she left the ICP in 1979. She also headed up the Photography Department at the Convent of the Sacred Heart, 1976–1982. Having taken a course and received a "certificate of honor in recognition of outstanding achievement in color photography-prize winning prints" in Ektacolor printing at Germain School of Photography in 1975 taught by Hollingsworth, she developed a course in Cibachrome printing that she taught at the ICP.

She was invited to speak as a presenter or panelist on the topic of women's history and her photography, topics and occasions have included the Society for Photographic Education Northeastern region conference, slide show, 1982; the American Society of Picture Professionals, slide show, 1983; The Radcliffe Club of NY at the Harvard Club, a presentation on the work of Alice Austen, 1985; "Photography as a Political Art" with panelists Alex McLean and Anne Whiston Spirn, 40th reunion of the class of 1969, Harvard, 2004; "Making Women's History Visible" panel presentation "Preserving the Passion of the Past" at Smith College, 2003.

Henry wrote about photography for the American Society of Picture Professionals in 1981: "Fifty Great Women Photographers; An Annotated Checklist"

Since 1985, she has been writing, translating from the French, publishing and speaking about the Natzweiler-Struthof concentration camp and its Nacht und Nebel political prisoners, including the Jewish spy Andre Scheinmann. Conferences at which she has been invited to present include the Association for Jewish Studies /AJS 41st Annual Conference, Los Angeles, December 2009, and the 40th Annual Scholars Conference on the Holocaust and the Churches at St. Joseph's University, 2010. Henry's paper entitled "Call Me Andre: Memoirs of a Jewish Spy in the Resistance" was published in the Journal of Ecumenical Studies.. Her book I Am André, German Jew, French Resistance Fighter, British Spy about André Joseph Scheinmann was published by Chiselbury in 2024.

== Exhibitions and galleries ==
- 1973: Group exhibit at Hanratty's, curated by Lee Romero, with Rachel Cowan et al.
- 1975: "Breadth of Vision: Portfolios of Women Photographers" juried by Liliane de Cock, Barbara Morgan, Marge Neikrug, Anne Tucker
- "The Bus Show" with Bill Cunningham, Lois Connor, Scott Hyde, Lilo Raymond, Ruth Orkin, W. Eugene Smith, Jim Alinder, et al.
- 1976: "Images of Women", Portland, Maine
- International Women's Arts Festival: "Woman Photographs Man: A Slide Presentation", Rockefeller Center.
- 1978: "City Games", Midtown Y Gallery, with Larry Fink, Nancy Rudolf, Arthur Tress, et al.
- NY Photographers' Forum exhibit, Milwaukee Center for Photography.
- 1979: "East Side-West Side: New York Photography", Roanoke College, Olin Hall Gallery.
- 1980: Women, Image, Nature", Temple University, Tyler School of Art, all galleries, curated by Martha Madigan, with Joan Lyons, Barbara Morgan, Bea Nettles, Barbara Crane, Mary Beth Edelson et al.
- 1981: "The Finished Print", curated by Larry Fink and Martha Madigan
- 1982: "Focus on Women", The First Women's Bank, with James Van der Zee, Bettye Lane, Tana Hoban, et al.
- 1983: "Photographs from France", solo exhibit, Overseas Press Club.
- "One Room Schools and Schoolteachers", Granite Hills Photography Gallery, Hardwick, VT,
- "Photographs: Selected Work of the Last Fifteen Years", solo exhibit, Ballard Mill Center for the Arts, Malone, NY.
- 1984: "One Room Schools and Schoolteachers of Vermont" solo exhibit, curated by Rod Faulds, text by Professor Margaret Nelson, at the Brattleboro Museum,
- "First National Photography Resume Exhibition", Project Arts Center, Cambridge, MA
- 1985: National Women's Hall of Fame, solo exhibit, official photographs of the First National Women's Conference, March 1983
- 1986: Catskill Center for Photography 8th and 9th (1987) Annual Benefit Auction of Contemporary and Vintage Photographs and Works on Paper
- 1987: "One-Room Schools of Ulster County" solo exhibit of the documentary project funded by an Individual Artist's Grant from the NY State Council on the Arts, shown at the Women's Studio Workshop, Inskirts Gallery, Rosendale, NY, the Erpf Catskill Cultural Center and the Catskill Center for Photography, Woodstock, NY
- 1988: "Libel", an exhibit of Photographs and Words, solo exhibit, Pacific Grove Arts Center,
- 1989: Slide show at intermission of the first Broadway run of The Heidi Chronicles, with Bettye Lane and Ken Regan
- Member Exhibit, Pacific Grove Art Center,
- Monterey County Women's Exhibition, sponsored by the Monterey County Cultural Council
- 1990: "Photowork '90", curated by Barbara Millstein,
- "The Divine Feminine"
- 1991 "Vanishing Jews of Alsace and the Natzweiler-Struthof Concentration Camp", solo exhibit with text of L'Enfer d'Alsace by Eugene Marlot voiced by 4 dozen residents of Carmel, CA, at the Carl Cherry Center, March 1991.
- "Dreaming Art", Carl Cherry Foundation, 4/6-28/91 (also 1993)
- 1993: "The Creative Feminine", Santa Cruz Art League,
- Artists' Studio Tour of Henry studio at the Carl Cherry Foundation (also 1994 and 1995)
- "The Subject is Women"
- 1994: "The Way We Were", solo exhibit of photographs taken for the Harvard Crimson, 1967–1969, at the Science Center, Harvard, June 1994
- 1995: "Redefining Legacies", National Juried Exhibition,
- Membership Exhibition Women's Caucus for Art National Conference, San Antonio,
- "Reflections of Our Jewish Identity" – Jewish Women Artists Network Exhibition curated by Marcia Goren Weser, UT Health Science Center Auditorium Foyer Gallery; "Our Secret Selves" Jewish Women Artists Network xerox project
- "Mentors and Role Models" presented by Diana Mara Henry / Alice Austen and Margaretta Mitchell / Nell Dorr, part of the Fireside Lecture series of the Monterey Bay Women's Caucus for Art, June 22, 1995
- Women and Animals", Society for Photographic Education / SPE conference
- 2013: "Photographer DMH" an online exhibit at UMass Amherst's Dubois Library by Chuck Abel

== Publications ==
Her photographs have appeared in many magazines and books such as The Perfect Portfolio by Henrietta Brackman, The Photograph Collectors' Guide by Lee Witkin and Barbara London; The Best of Photojournalism 4: Newsweek's Pictures of the Year 1977; The Best of Popular Photography; and as a slide show during the intermission of the first run of the 1989 Pulitzer and Tony award-winning play, The Heidi Chronicles.

Her photography is also featured on the covers of the books: "The American Women's Movement 1945–2000", by Nancy McLean; Feminist Coalitions: Historical Perspectives on Second-Wave Feminism in the United States by Stephanie Gilmore; "On the Move: American Women in the 1970s" by Winifred D.Wandersee; and in the books: Red Feminism by Kate Weigand; Dear Sisters; Dispatches from the Women's Liberation Movement, edited by Rosalynn Baxandall Linda Gordon; Malcolm Forbes: Around the World on Hot Air and Two Wheels, Spiritual Radical: Abraham Joshua Heschel in America by Edward K. Kaplan; Women in America: Half of History, by Mary Kay Thompson Tetreault; Through Women's Eyes, An American History with Documents by Ellen Carol DuBois and Lynn DumenilThe Liberals' Moment: The McGovern Insurgency and the Identity Crisis of the Democratic Party, by Bruce Miroff; Betty Friedan and the Making of the Feminine Mystique by Daniel Horowitz; The Decade of Women: A Ms. History of the Seventies in Words and Pictures; A Pictorial History of Women in America by Ruth Warren; The World Split Open: How the Modern Women's Movement Changed America by Ruth Rosen Coretta Scott King: Keeper of the Dream by Sandra Henry and Emily Taitz; The Harvard Crimson Anthology: 100 years at Harvard edited by Greg Lawless; Stayin'Alive: The 1970s and The Last Days of the Working Class.(selected list.)

- 1973: Cover photo: La Forteresse, by Pierrette Fleutiaux, Juillard
- 1977: High Lady: For Women Who Dare: feature about "Tania Temerson, a 28-year-old American whose career as a jockey has taken her to ...France."
- "18 Women, 417 Men", with Henry's photo of Elizabeth Holtzman, one of 18 women in Congress; flyer reprinted as a promotional piece from November issue of Good Housekeeping
- 1978: Viva Magazine, "They Shoot Pictures, Don't They?" interview with Henry et al. by Eddie Adams
- 1979: Women in American Life Video Series by the National Women's History Project, Program 5: "1955–1977: New Attitudes Force Dramatic Change" and subsequent NWHP publications: 1997 Gazette, "Living the Legacy", full cover photo and double-page centerfold; "150 Years for Equality, 1998; "Our History is Our Strength: A women's Perspective", gazette and poster, 2011

== Collections ==
Diana Mara Henry's photographs were the first contemporary collection of photographs to be housed at the Schlesinger Library, in 1976. Her photographs of the First National Women's Conference were exhibited there in 1998. The "Diana Mara Henry: Twentieth Century Photographer" collection is now housed at the Du Bois Library, U Mass Amherst. That collection includes more than 50,000 negatives, 10,000 color slides, 5,000 prints, and documentation for the history of the last four decades of the 20th century as seen in her photographs. The Du Bois has created an online exhibit as well as an introduction to the collection and some 1,000 images already online.

== Notable portrait subjects ==
1967–1969: Daniel Patrick Moynihan, Walter Gropius, Nathan Pusey, Erik Erikson, Stanley Hoffman, Martin Peretz, Jacques Lipchitz, Mary Ingram Bunting, Elma Lewis, Peggy Cass, Elsa Martinelli, Donovan, Suzanne Pleshette, Mildred Natwick, Ian McShane, Rowland Scherman

1972: George McGovern, Eleanor McGovern, Bella Abzug (through 1980), Elizabeth Holtzman (through 1980), Hubert Humphrey, Edmund Muskie, Thomas Eagleton, Sargent Shriver, Eunice Shriver, Shirley Chisholm, Charles Rangel, Yvonne Brathwaite Burke, Jesse Jackson, Gloria Steinem (through 1980), Lawrence O'Brien, Norman Mailer, Allen Ginsberg, Edward Kennedy, Richard Tuck, Richard Wade, Allard Lowenstein (through 1980), Herman Badillo, John Lindsay, Abraham Beame, Robert Wagner, David Dinkins, Robert Drinan, Arnold Weiss, Jean O'Leary, Abraham Joshua Heschel, Henry Jackson,

1973: William Fulbright, Lowell Weicker, Paul O'Dwyer, David Halberstam, Art Buchwald, Carl Bernstein, Brit Hume, Anne Klein, Bob Mackie, Eleanor Lambert Beckson, Clovis Ruffin, Giorgio di Sant' Angelo, Ralph Lauren, Calvin Klein, Ogden Reid, Mario Cuomo, Mario Biaggi, Bill Cosby, Rosie Casals, Billie Jean King, Bud Collins, Betty Friedan (and decade following), Donna Shalala

1974: John Paul Getty III, Egon von Fürstenberg, Lowell Nesbitt, Andrew Crispo, Jeannette Watson (and decade following), Katherine Johnson, Frank Oz, Cookie Monster, Victor Gottbaum, Ann Beatts

1975: Salvador Dalí, Mary Lasker, Sylvia Crane, Robert Polo, Dominick Dunne, Charles James, Karl Lagerfeld, Robert Motherwell, Andy Warhol (and decade following), Rudi Gernreich, Deborah Turbeville, Eugene McCarthy,

1976: Diana Vreeland, Marisa Berenson, Bill Blass, Pauline Trigere, Sister Joan Kirby, Lillian Carter, Billy Carter, Jimmy Carter, Hugh Carter, Las Barrera, Leroy Jolly, Ramsey Clark, Walter Mondale, Howard Metzenbaum, Lubbavitcher Rebbe Menachem Mendel Schneerson, Ralph Demers, Dyan Cannon, Jeanne Moreau

1977: Christopher Forbes, Joseph Hammer, Jane Stanton Hitchcock, Susan Watson, Patti Smith, Robert Forbes, Peter Galassi, Barbara Jordan, Rosalynn Carter, Betty Ford, Patsy Mink, Margaret Mead, Coretta Scott King, Phyllis Schlafly, Jean Stapleton, Mary Burke Nicholas, John Mack Carter, Hugh Carey, C. Delores Tucker, Jill Ruckelshaus, Caroline Bird, Mildred Jeffrey, Clara Beyer, Kathryn Clarenbach, Mary Crisp, Maya Angelou, Lucy Komisar, Helvi Sipila, Margaret Heckler

1978: Tip O'Neill, Geraldine Ferraro, Sarah Weddington

== Notable events photographed ==
1971: Vietnam Veterans Against the War demonstration on Boston Common; camp-out and arrests in Lexington, Memorial Day weekend; demonstration against the invasion of Cambodia in front of the ITT building on Park Avenue, NYC.

1972: Democratic National Convention, Miami Beach; Allard Lowenstein congressional campaign

1973: A.J. Liebling Counter-Convention; Manhattan Women's Political Caucus Tennis Celebrity Fundraiser at the Park Avenue Armory; William Van den Heuvel primary campaign; Senate Watergate Committee at the Capitol; New Democratic Coalition Convention; mock bombing street theater and demonstration against the invasion of Cambodia in front of the ITT Building, Park Avenue, NYC; Ramsey Clark senatorial campaign

1974: Impeach Nixon rally, Brooklyn College; Demonstration in front of The New York Times for the use of the term MS (which the paper adopted in 1986); Cookie Monster's debut with Frank Oz at the Advertising Council's Media News conference, New Democratic Coalition Convention; "Titters presents: A Seminar on Funny Womanhood"; Bali, Kathmandu, Istanbul, Hong Kong, Hawaii, Zurich (photographed in color)

1975: Gala Fashion as Fantasy event at Rizzoli bookstore; Dorothy Pirozzi, blind cosmetologist at work at the Lighthouse for the Blind; Metropolitan Museum of Art Fashion Institute opening; demonstration against Senate Bill 1, Foley Square, by the Committee against Repressive Legislation; Concord Bicentennial reenactment of "the shot heard 'round the world"; Holography exhibit opening, International Center of Photography/ICP and Henri Lartigue/Louise Dahl-Wolfe workshop; Fortieth Anniversary of the Hayden Planetarium party Howard Samuels campaign for Governor; fabrication of Robert Murray's "Quinnipiac" statue

1976: International Center of Photography / ICP 2nd Anniversary party, "Masters of the Camera" opening; Plains, Georgia, in the week before and election night; the Triple Crown: Preakness, Derby and Belmont Stakes; Democratic National Convention, Madison Square Garden and vicinity, including the Women's Caucus and street rallies; marches for the ERA in NYC; National Women's Political Caucus Democratic Task Force and the Democratic Women's Agenda "A Party with a Purpose: To Strengthen the Role of Women in Politics" fundraiser at Lincoln Center; Second International Festival of Women's Films party at the French consulate; Second Annual Ed and Sylvia Sullivan Award to Howard Cosell at the Waldorf Astoria; The Paris Opera "coming to the US for the first time in its 307-year history as France's bicentennial gift"; press conference of the National Committee to Reopen the Rosenberg Case.

1977: 13th Annual Avant Garde Festival of New York at the World Trade Center; Museum of Modern Art / MOMA Charlotte Moorman performance playing cello in a bag; Lynn Glauber Darryl Gray and Dancers at the 92nd St. Y; campaigns of Carol Bellamy, Joel Harnett; NY State Women's Meeting and First National Women's Conference, Houston, November 19–21, photographed on assignment as official photographer for the National Commission on the Observance of International Women's Year
