= National Commission on the Observance of International Women's Year =

IWY Commission
- National Commission on the Observance of International Women's Year

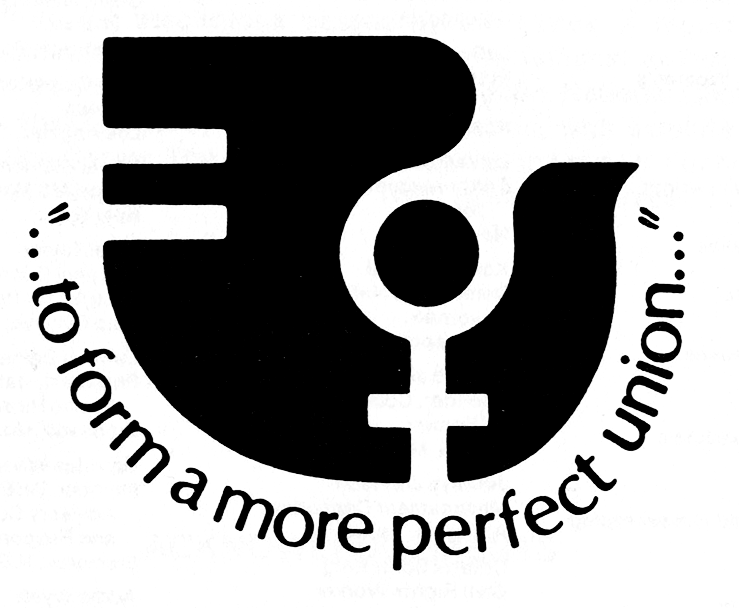
- Logo used by the Commission, adapted from the United Nations official logo

History
- Status: Defunct
- Established by: Gerald Ford on January 9, 1975
- Disbanded: March 31, 1978
- Related Executive Order number(s): 11832, 11889, 11979, 11980

Membership
- Chairperson: Jill Ruckelshaus (1975-6), Elizabeth Athanasakos (1976-7), Bella Abzug (1977-8)

Jurisdiction
- Purpose: Promote the national observance in the United States of International Women's Year; later, organizing 1977 National Women's Conference
- Policy areas: Women's rights

The National Commission on the Observance of International Women's Year was a presidential commission created by Gerald Ford on January 9, 1975 to promote the national observance in the United States of International Women's Year. The commission was tasked with "encouraging cooperative activity in the field of women's rights and responsibilities" in conjunction with International Women's Year, which had been declared by the United Nations in 1972. It was established by Executive Order 11832 and originally composed of 35 private citizens appointed by the president.

The Commission was extended by congressional statute by HR 9924 beyond 1975 to March 31, 1978. The Commission enjoyed continued support by President Jimmy Carter after his assumption of office in January 1977, culminating in the organizing of the 1977 National Women's Conference and its 1978 report, The Spirit of Houston, which was a summary of the 26 planks adopted as the National Plan of Action at the conference.

After the commission's expiry in March 1978, Carter established the National Advisory Committee for Women by executive order.

== Membership ==
The Commission's membership was originally composed of 35 private citizens appointed by the President. This number was expanded to 45 by executive order from President Carter.

While the Carter presidency did originally consider reappointed a larger number of members from the Ford administration, only a handful did so: Elizabeth Athanasakos, the outgoing presiding officer; Audrey Rowe Colom, chairperson of the National Women's Political Caucus; Martha Griffiths, the first woman elected to Congress from Michigan; Lenore Hershey, editor of Ladies' Home Journal; Ersa Poston, a civil servant from New York; and Gerridee Wheeler, Republican political official from North Dakota. The ex officio congressional members were all retained, with the exception of Bella Abzug, who lost her election to be a Senator for New York, who became the new presiding officer and was replaced by fellow New York Democratic congresswoman Elizabeth Holtzman.

The first Presiding Officer was Jill Ruckelshaus until June 1976, after which it was Elizabeth Athanasakos. The Commission also included four Members of Congress, two Senators and two Representatives in its membership. Those members were: Senator Birch Bayh (D), Senator Charles H. Percy (R), Representative Bella Abzug (D), and Representative Margaret Heckler (R). Other members during the Ford presidency (1975-8) were:

- Alan Alda
- Ethel D. Allen
- Anne Armstrong
- Margaret Long Arnold
- Barbara Bergmann
- Patricia Carbine
- Weston Christopherson
- Mary Stallings Coleman
- Audrey Rowe Colom
- Helen K. Copley
- Richard Cornuelle
- Casey Eike
- Paula Gibson
- Gilda Gjurich
- Ella T. Grasso
- Martha Griffiths
- Katharine Hepburn
- Lenore Hershey
- Velma Murphy Hill
- Patricia Hutar
- Rita Johnston
- Ellen Groves Kirby
- Dorothy Vale Kissinger
- Clare Boothe Luce
- William Crawford Mercer
- Ersa Poston
- Sister Joel Read
- Betty Smith
- Mary Louise Smith (Sep 1975-7)
- Barbara Walters (1975 only)
- Annie Dodge Wauneka
- Gerridee Wheeler
- Winfield C. Dunn

During the Carter presidency, the presiding officer was Bella Abzug, a former ex officio member as a U.S. representative. Other members included:

- Ruth Abram
- Maya Angelou
- Elizabeth Athanasakos
- Betty Blanton
- Cecilia Preciado Burgiaga
- Liz Carpenter
- John Mack Carter
- Sey Chassler
- Ruth C. Clusen
- Audrey Rowe Colom
- Jane Culbreth
- Harry T. Edwards
- Rita Elway
- Beverly Everett
- Betty Ford
- Bernice S. Frieder
- Martha Griffiths
- Dorothy Haener
- Rhea Mojica Hammer
- LaDonna Harris
- Lenore Hershey
- Koryne Horbal
- Mildred Jeffrey
- Jeffalyn Johnson
- Coretta Scott King
- Mary Anne Krupsak
- Margaret Mealey
- Jean O'Leary
- Mildred Persinger
- Connie Plunkett
- Ersa Poston
- Claire Randall
- Alice S. Rossi
- Gloria Scott
- Eleanor Smeal
- Jean Stapleton
- Gloria Steinem
- Ethel Taylor
- Carmen Delgado Votaw
- Gerridee Wheeler
- Addie Wyatt

The membership of the Carter years of the Commission was notable for its diversity and its inclusion of minority groups. Prominent African American poet Maya Angelou and civil rights leader Coretta Scott King were added as members, as was Jean O'Leary, as a representative voice from the National Gay Task Force. This carried notable consequences for the commission's work, including the proposition of a plank around lesbian rights in the National Plan of Action, one of the most controversial sections and one of the highest level debates for LGBT rights at its time.

== Activities ==
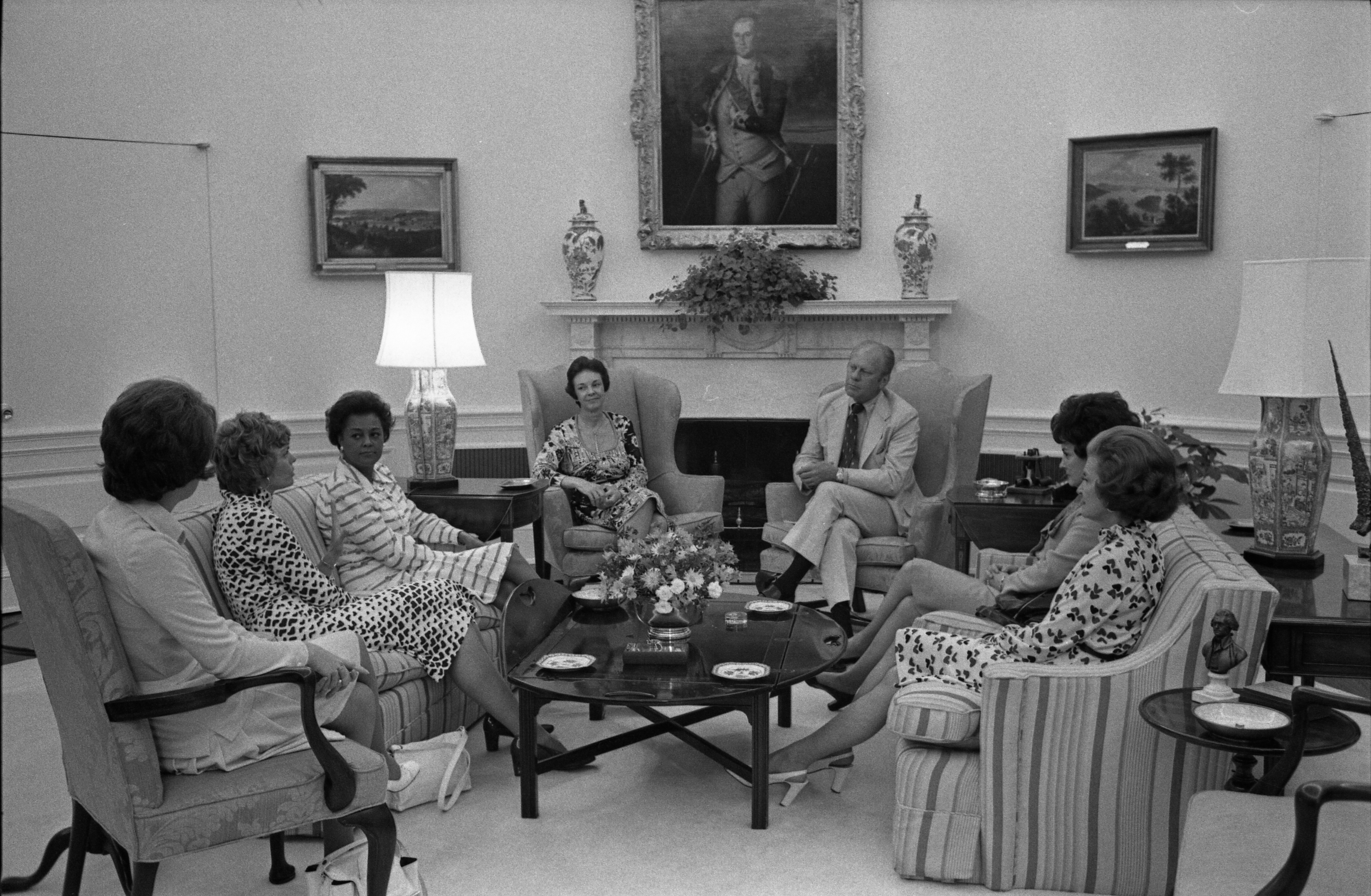
President Gerald Ford (center right) and First Lady Betty Ford with members of the US delegation to the World Conference on Women, 1975, two weeks after the conference.

The activities of the commission changed over time, in line with the political interests of the presidents at the time. In both presidencies, the adoption of the Equal Rights Amendment was a prominent theme, with its ratification debate lasting throughout the duration of the Commission's existence.

=== World Conference on Women, 1975 ===
The United Nations' activities around International Women's Year focused on the World Conference on Women, 1975, held in Mexico City. The United States participated in the conference, sending three representatives: Patricia Hutar, delegation head and U.S. Representative to the U.N. Commission on the Status of Women; Jewel LaFontant, former Deputy Solicitor General of the Department of Justice and U.S. Representative of the Conference; and Jill Ruckelshaus. The conference culminated in a World Plan of Action, which the United States voted against due to its inclusion of anti-Zionist language.

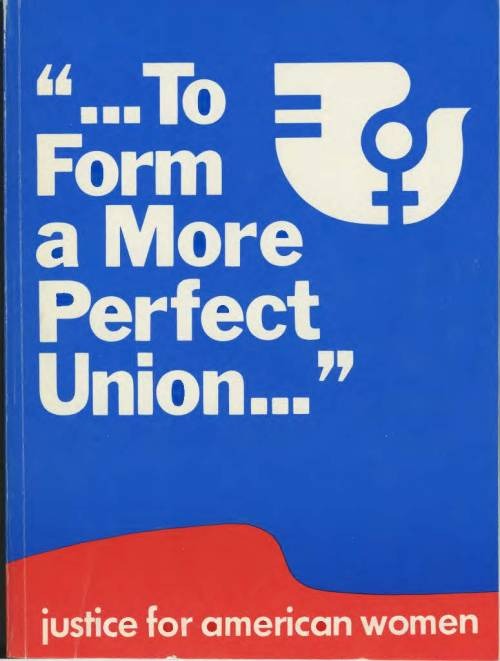
Cover the Commission's 1976 report

While the United States did not sign the World Plan of Action, the Commission published a report to the United States President, entitled "To Form a More Perfect Union...": Justice for American Women. The report focuses on a number of issues, including gendered divisions of domestic labor, the Equal Rights Amendment, the under-representation of women in public life, and child care. The report is notable for its endorsement of the Supreme Court's decision in Roe v. Wade and asked the government to continue to remove other barriers "to permit women greater choice with regard to their reproductive lives."

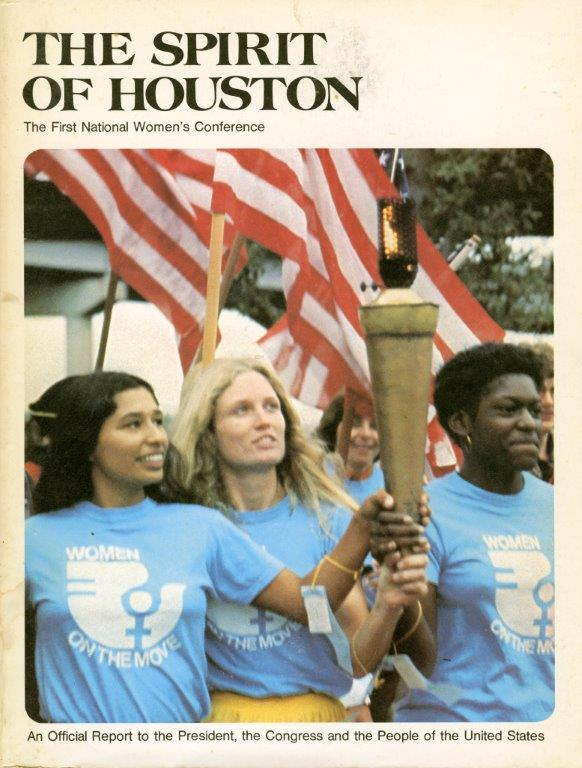
Cover of the Spirit of Houston, the official report that represented the commission's final output.

=== 1977 National Women's Conference ===
In the Carter years, the Commission turned its focus to the 1977 National Women's Conference and its 56 supporting state and territorial conventions, where delegates for the national conference were to be selected. The event was one of the first events of its kind to be funded by the U.S. government and came at the pinnacle of second-wave feminism in American politics. The conference was a key part of the FX on Hulu television series Mrs. America, where many of the Commission's members, including two of its three presiding officers, were main characters.
