= National Advisory Committee for Women =

United States presidential commission

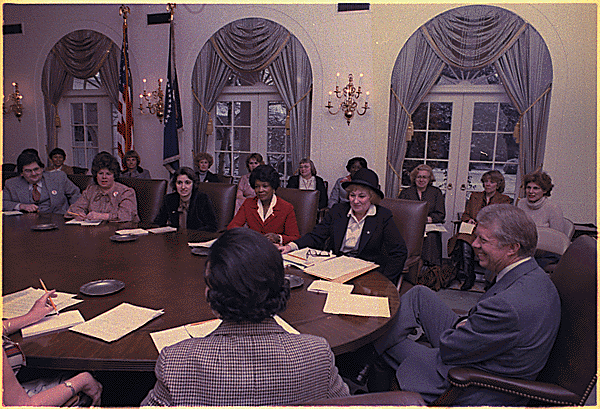
- President Jimmy Carter (bottom right) meets with NACW members, including Bella Abzug (center right, in hat) and others. Abzug would be dismissed shortly after this meeting, and the committee would completely change within days.

History
- Status: Defunct
- Established by: Jimmy Carter on April 4, 1978
- Disbanded: December 31, 1980
- Related Executive Order number(s): 12050, 12135

Membership
- Chairperson: Bella Abzug and Carmen Delgado Votaw (1978-9, co-chairs); Lynda Bird Johnson Robb (1979-1980)

Jurisdiction
- Purpose: Advise the President on a regular basis of initiatives needed to promote full equality for American women; assist in reviewing the applicability of such initiatives, including recommendations of the 1977 National Women's Conference, to particular programs and policies; and promote the national observance of the United Nations Decade for Women.
- Policy areas: Women's rights, Equal Rights Amendment, 1977 National Women's Conference

The National Advisory Committee for Women (NACW) was a presidential commission established by President Jimmy Carter in 1978. It was renamed the President's Advisory Committee for Women (PACFW), with a reduced mandate, in 1979.

It was the successor to the National Commission on the Observance of International Women's Year, with many of the outgoing members of that commission serving on the advisory committee. It was replaced by the Task Force on Legal Equity for Women, launched in December 1981 by President Ronald Reagan with Executive Order 12336.

== History ==
The first body appointed by the U.S. president to focus on the status of women in the United States was the Presidential Commission on the Status of Women, appointed by President John F. Kennedy and chaired by former First Lady Eleanor Roosevelt. Since then, each president to date had formed an appointed body of some form.

President Gerald Ford established the National Commission on the Observance of International Women's Year (IWY Commission) in 1975, as connected to the United Nations' declaration of 1975 as International Women's Year. This commission participated in the World Conference on Women, 1975, and then became the statutory body by congressional legislation to organize the 1977 National Women's Conference.

The IWY commission, extended by congressional statute rather than presidential order, was then limited in its mandate to finish its work within six months of the 1977 conference. It published The Spirit of Houston, which engrossed the 26 planks adopted by delegates at the conference and included provisions around the Equal Rights Amendment, abortion rights, child care, and sexual orientation.

== Original mission ==
The committee was constituted as an extension of the IWY Commission's work. It included the promotion of the United Nations Decade for Women as part of its mandate and included a number of members from the previous commission in its membership. However, the committee found little success in its early days and did not meet with President Carter until January 1979, nearly nine months after the committee's appointment. A 15-minute opportunity was offered by the White House in November 1978, tentatively accepted by Abzug before the committee overruled her decision and canceled the meeting.

=== Membership ===
The co-chairs of the committee were Bella Abzug, the outgoing chair of the IWY Commission, and Carmen Delgado Votaw, also an outgoing member of the Carter-era IWY Commission. Another ten commission members returned to the advisory committee:

- Cecilia Preciado-Burciaga, academic at Stanford University
- Sey Chassler, editor-in-chief of Redbook magazine
- Koryne Horbal, U.S. Representative on the U.N. Commission on the Status of Women
- Mildred Jeffrey, president of the National Women's Political Caucus
- Jeffalyn Johnson, academic at the Federal Executive Institute
- Jean O'Leary, co-executive director of the National Gay Task Force
- Claire Randall, general secretary of the National Council of Churches of Christ in the USA
- Jill Ruckelshaus, former presiding officer of the IWY Commission during Ford administration
- Eleanor Smeal, NOW president
- Addie Wyatt, labor advocate

The membership of the advisory committee included a number of other members, including a number of advocates from minority and religious groups and from the labor movement. These members are:

- Owanah Anderson, Democratic political official
- Unita Blackwell, mayor of Mayersville, Mississippi
- Erma Bombeck, author
- Marjory Bell Chambers, president of the American Association of University Women
- Mary D. Crisp, pro-choice Republican Party official
- Miriam Cruz, board member for the National Conference of Puerto Rican Women
- Piilani Desha, president of Business and Professional Women's Clubs
- Donna de Verona, former Olympic swimmer
- Gretta DeWald, director of the DNC Women's Division
- Charles E. Guerrier, attorney and executive director of Women's Law Fund, Inc.
- Judie Heuman, deputy director the Center for Independent Living (Berkeley)
- Lane Kirkland, secretary-treasurer of AFL-CIO
- Odessa Komer, vice president for International Union-United Auto Workers
- Florine Koole, labor activist
- Elizabeth Koontz, former president of the NEA
- Esther Landa, president of the National Council of Jewish Women
- Brownie Ledbetter, women's business advocate
- Mary Helen Madden, executive director of the National Council of Catholic Women
- Billie Nave Masters, member of the DNC Indian Women's Caucus
- Joyce D. Miller, labor advocate
- Nancy Neuman, president of the League of Women Voters
- Brenda Parker, high school senior and Future Homemakers of America president
- Carolyn Reed, NWPC member
- Ann Richards, Travis County Commissioner and NWPC member
- Richard Rossie, attorney
- Tin Myaing Thein, researcher
- Marlo Thomas, actor-producer
- Maxine Waters, California state legislator
- Patricia Ybarra, feminist activist

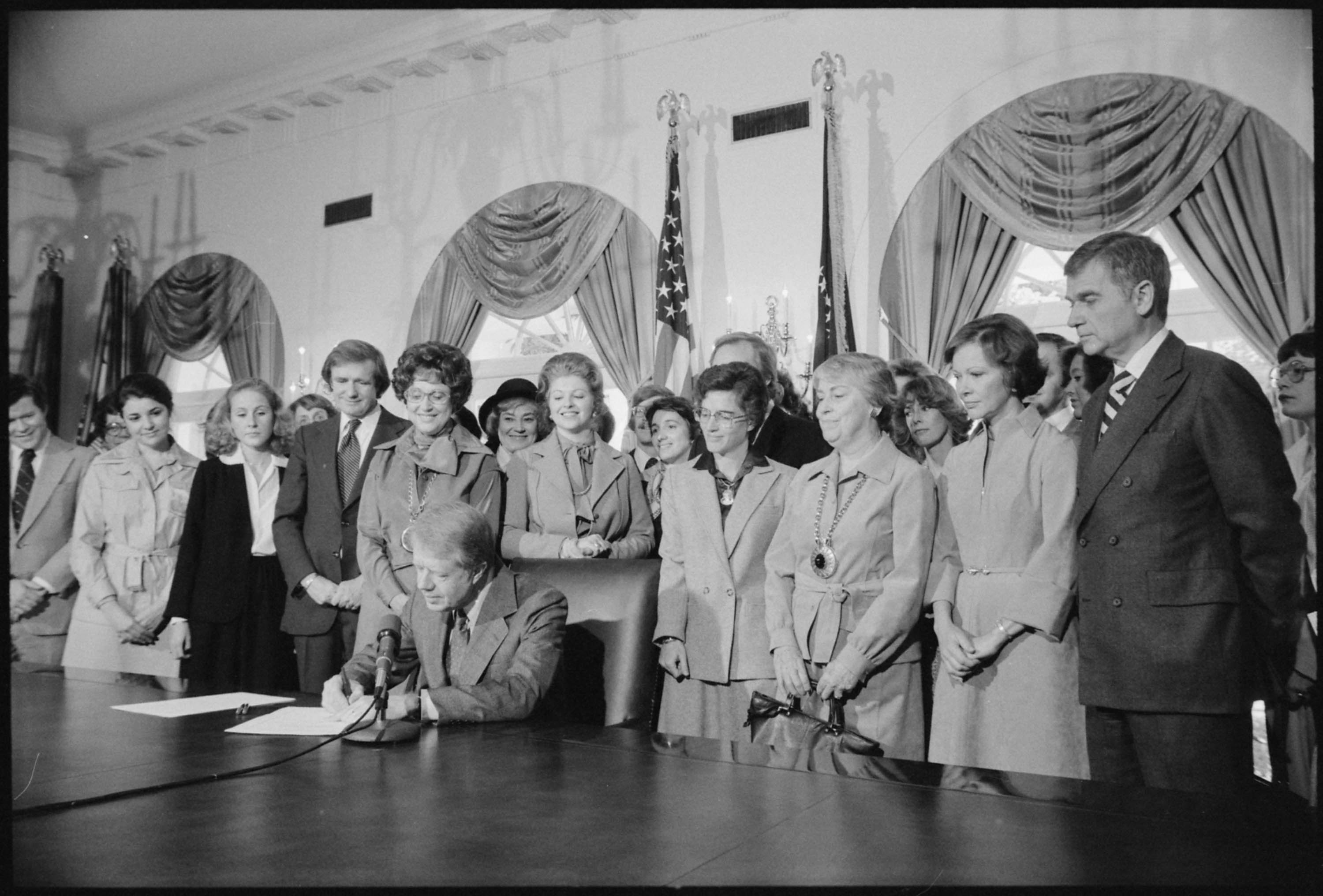
President Jimmy Carter signing the extension of the ERA's ratification deadline. NACW co-chair Bella Abzug pictured two rows behind Carter, with the hat.

=== Extension of the Equal Rights Amendment ===
One of the few political victories of the committee was the three-year extension of the Equal Rights Amendment's ratification deadline from March 1979 to June 1982. During this extension, no further states ratified or rescinded their ratification of the amendment.

=== Dismissal of Abzug and fallout ===
On January 12, 1979, following the first meeting with the advisory committee, Abzug was invited to additional private meeting with Hamilton Jordan and Robert J. Lipshutz, where Abzug was dismissed as the co-chair. This was done in response to a press release distributed by the advisory committee that was critical of President Carter's economic policies. Later evidence suggests that the decision to fire Abzug was already agreed internally by the White House before the NACW meeting even took place.

In the following days, a majority of the committee's members – at least 26 of the original 40 – resigned in solidarity with Abzug, including co-chairperson Delgado Votaw. This included all committee members who also served on the IWY Commission. Presidential assistant Sarah Weddington, despite characterizing the January 12 meeting as "excellent", recognized the public relations damage of the resignations. Two members, Tin Myaing Thein and Billie Nave Masters, each a spokesperson for minority group caucuses within the Democratic Party, later returned and stayed with the President's Advisory Committee.

This episode of the committee's history was dramatized in the final episode of the FX on Hulu miniseries Mrs. America.

== Reform to President's Advisory Committee ==
After the dismissal of Bella Abzug and the collective resignation of 26 of the committee's 40 members, President Jimmy Carter reconstituted the committee and appointed Lynda Bird Johnson Robb as the new chairperson. Robb would serve in that capacity for the remainder of the committee's duration.

=== Criticisms ===
Critics, such as Abzug and Steinem, said that the reformed committee was "seriously impaired by the President" in terms of its independence. The PACFW had two key changes in its mandate from the NACW: it lost its mandate on the promotion of the United Nations Decade for Women, now limited to "advice on appropriate ways to promote" it, and it had its mandate to disseminate related materials limited to "newsletters or other appropriate means, to the Executive Branch and to interested members of the public." These changes were confirmed in a legal opinion from the DOJ Office of Legal Counsel, which confirmed that the 1979 reconstitution of the committee "removed its nonadvisory functions."

=== Final report and decommissioning ===
The committee formally ended its work in line with its 1979 mandate with the December 1980 publication of the Voices for Women report. The report dedicates its entire second chapter to the Equal Rights Amendment and focuses the remaining chapters on its report on education (Chapter 3), health (Chapter 4), human services (Chapter 5), and work and income security (Chapter 6).

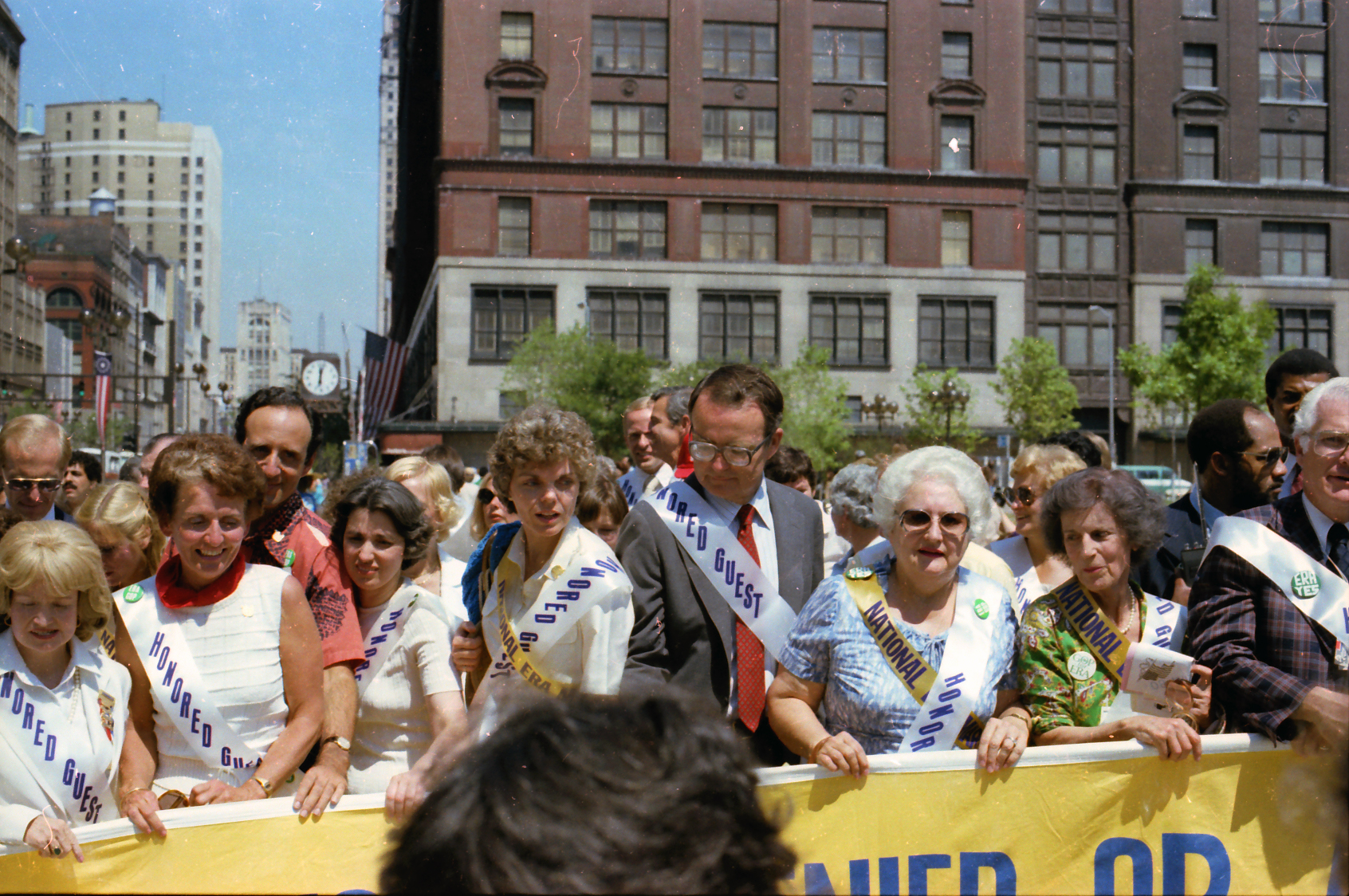
Pro-ERA march during 1980 Republican National Convention, where the party dropped their support

== Legacy and impact ==
Much of the committee's work, closely aligned with second-wave feminism in United States politics, did not see continuation. With the 1980 presidential election and as Ronald Reagan took office, his administration pursued a number of more socially conservative policies and the transition of feminist policies as a partisan issue. The Equal Rights Amendment, a key part of the committee's foundations, did not meet its original ratification date and remains a political debate today. Instead, at the 1980 Republican National Convention, the party would abandon its support of the Equal Rights Amendment for the first time in four decades. The party would also harden its position against abortion.

The committee's tumultuous and short history sits in the context of a history of Carter's administration underwhelming feminist activists. The ERA would fail to add any additional ratifications during his presidency. The Hyde Amendment, which prohibited federal funds from being used to enable access to abortion for low-income women, was passed by Congress and with public, personal support from Carter. Feminist activist Midge Costanza would resign her position in the White House in August 1978, with critics suggesting she was fired from her role.

It also marked the maturation of feminist organizations as independent political forces. Women's issues would remain a dominant political issue for the Democratic Party. At its 1980 national convention, the plank around the Equal Rights Amendment was subject to fierce debate between feminists, organized by the National Organization for Women and the National Women's Political Caucus, and the Carter administration. Feminists would emerge victorious in part because of the support of delegates from the National Education Association.

Four years later in 1984 and encouraged by the very same critical organizations whose members resigned in great numbers with Abzug's dismissal, Democratic presidential candidate Walter Mondale would select U.S. Representative Geraldine Ferraro as his vice presidential running mate. This would mark the first woman from a major U.S. political party to be part of a presidential ticket.
