= 1977 National Women's Conference =

Four-day event in Houston, Texas

National Women's Conference of 1977
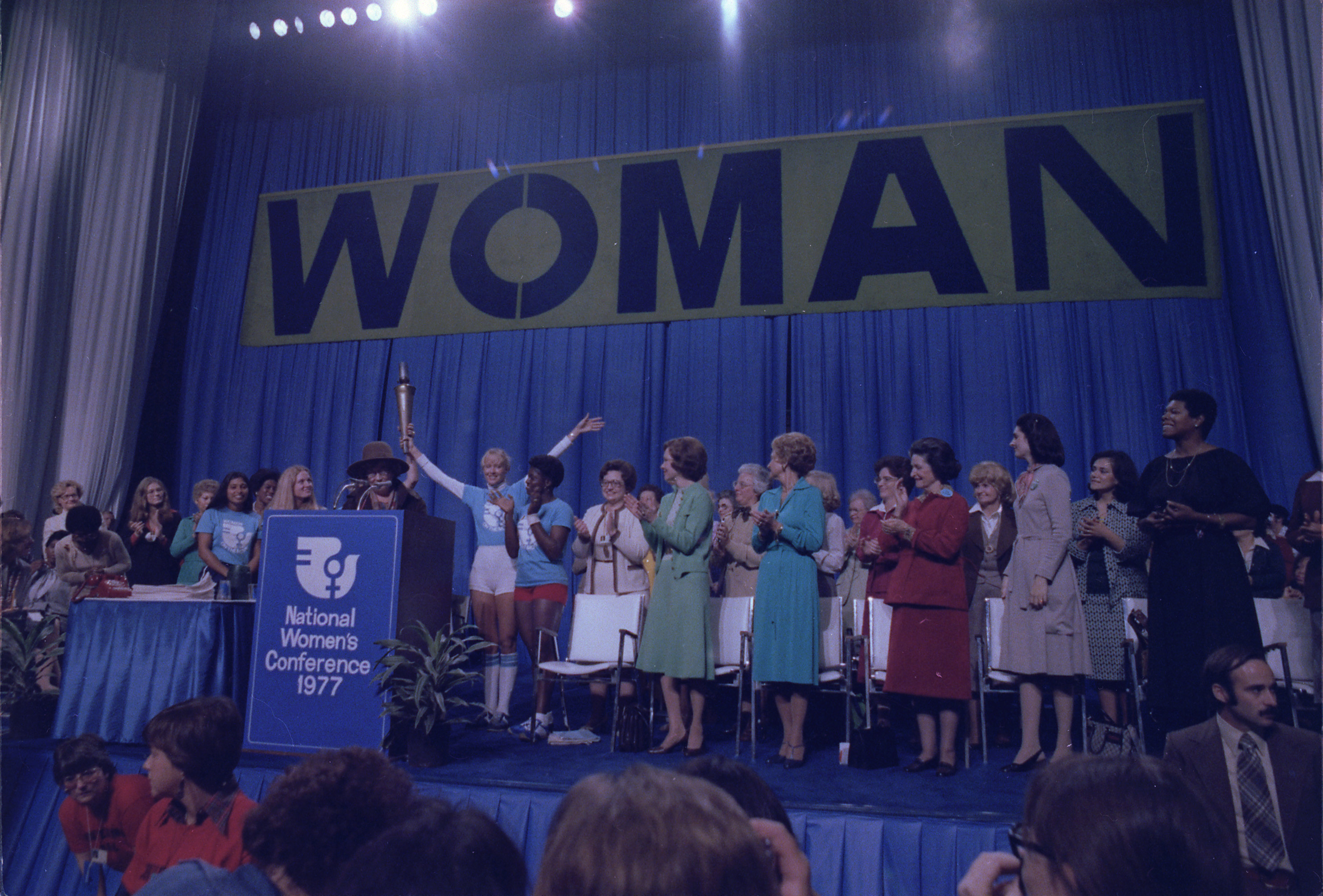
- The arrival of the torch, carried by a relay of women runners from Seneca Falls, New York, to Houston, Texas, during the Opening Ceremonies of the Conference. Conference Chairperson Bella Abzug (behind the podium); First Ladies Rosalynn Carter, Betty Ford, and Lady Bird Johnson (front row on right, L-R in green, blue, and red); and poet Maya Angelou (far right) on stage.
- Date: November 18–21, 1977
- Duration: 3 days
- Venue: Sam Houston Coliseum
- Location: Houston, Texas
- Theme: Women's issues, ratification of the Equal Rights Amendment
- Budget: $5,000,000
- Organised by: National Commission on the Observance of International Women's Year
- Outcome: The Spirit of Houston

The National Women's Conference of 1977 was a four-day event during November 18–21, 1977, as organized by the National Commission on the Observance of International Women's Year. The conference drew around 2,000 delegates along with 15,000-20,000 observers in Houston, Texas, United States. The United States Congress approved $5 million in public appropriations for both the state and national conferences as HR 9924, sponsored by Congresswoman Patsy Mink, which Ford signed into law. In 1977 at the start of his presidency, President Jimmy Carter chose a new Commission and appointed Congresswoman Bella Abzug to head it. Numerous events were held over the next two years, culminating in the National Women's Conference.

The conference represents a turning point for the political history of second-wave feminism in the United States. A number of controversial issues, including abortion rights and sexual orientation, were flashpoints in the event's program. Historian Marjorie J. Spruill argues that the anti-feminists led by Phyllis Schlafly had a more successful follow-up. They moved the Republican Party to a more socially conservative position. As the Reagan administration came into office in January 1981, much of the political support for the conference and its output, The Spirit of Houston, dissipated in national politics.

== History ==
In 1972, the United Nations proclaimed 1975 as International Women's Year. In the spirit of that proclamation, U.S. President Gerald Ford issued Executive Order 11832, creating a National Commission on the Observance of International Women's Year "to promote equality between men and women." Jill Ruckelshaus would be appointed its first chairperson.

This commission would become the organizing body for the conference as part of the provisions of congressional legislation that would appropriate $5,000,000 for the conference.

Before the Opening Ceremonies of the Conference, there was a relay of important women who brought a torch from Seneca Falls, New York to Houston, Texas. Seneca Falls was the location of the seminal women's rights convention in 1848, and this relay took place over 51 days to show and recognize the link between these two historical conferences. This relay was put together by multiple organizations, including the Road Runners of America, and the President's Council on Physical Fitness and Sports. Those taking part in the relay wore easily recognizable bright blue T-shirts with the words "Women on the Move" written on them. Some of the most notable people involved in this relay included Katherine Switzer (the first women to officially compete in the Boston Marathon), Donna de Varona (Olympic gold medalist and Women's Sports Foundation activist), and Billie Jean King.

== Event ==
The goal was to hammer out a "Plan of Action" to be presented to the Carter Administration and Congress for consideration and/or adoption. Each of the twenty-six Resolutions on Women's Rights in the Plan was proposed to the attendees and voted upon collectively. The Conference was chaired by Congresswoman Bella Abzug.

The opening ceremony speakers included: First Ladies Rosalynn Carter, Betty Ford and Lady Bird Johnson, activists Coretta Scott King, Bella Abzug, Betty Friedan, Barbara Jordan, Liz Carpenter, and Jean Stapleton. Maya Angelou read the Declaration of American Women 1977.

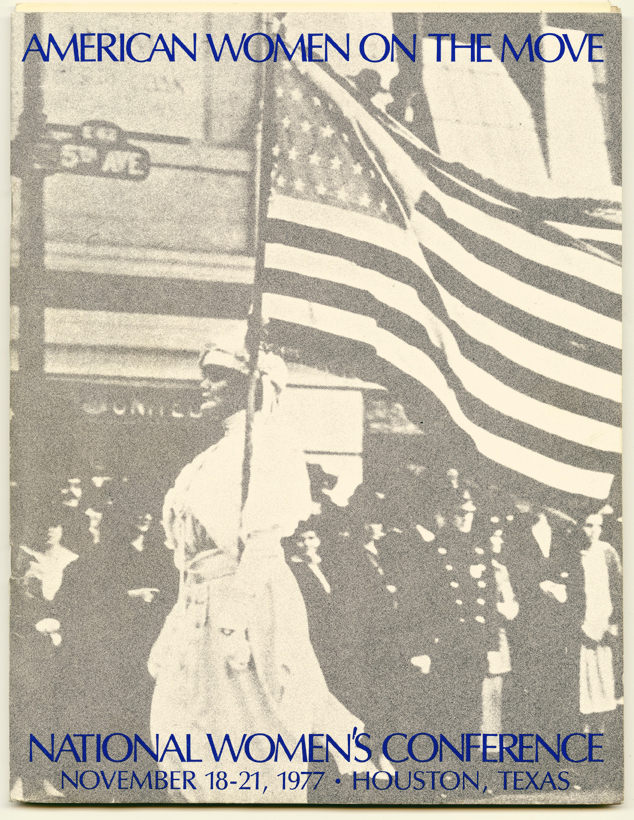
American Women on the Move, the cover of the program for the National Women's Conference

Heated debates ensued over 26 major topics addressed at the conference, such as the Equal Rights Amendment (ERA), reproductive rights, the nuclear family, child care funding, sexual orientation, education reform, and the rights of disabled, minority, and aging women. At the conference, there was also a lengthy discussion about nuclear disarmament and a series of talks featuring women who had reached important positions of responsibility in government such as chair of Equal Employment Opportunity Commission (EEOC), Assistant Secretary for the United States Department of Commerce, and head of the Environmental Protection Agency (EPA).

On the other side of Houston, at the Astrodome, almost fifteen thousand conservative women under the leadership of Phyllis Schlafly held their own counter-conference in which they vowed to uphold traditional pro-family values. The competing Houston conferences demonstrated the discord among women over key issues, and Schlafly's message that women had something to lose, not something to gain, from feminism continued to resonate in the increasingly conservative political climate. Nowhere was this clearer than in the battles over reproductive freedom and the Equal Rights Amendment, the issues most associated with feminism in the public mind in the 1970s.

An abundance of people attended the 1977 National Women's Conference and "delegates ranged from students and homemakers attending their first women's conference to Presidents of National Women's groups." The head of the conference was Congresswoman Bella Abzug who spoke in front of more than 20,000 of her fellow advocates.

Many people who were interested in feminism were at the 1977 National Women's Conference to support women's rights. The inspiring author Betty Friedan attended the conference, the feminist Gloria Steinem attended the conference along with a new feminist leader Eleanor Smeal. Celebrities in education and sports like the anthropologist Margaret Mead, the advocate for women in sports Billie Jean King, the poet Maya Angelou, Commissioner Jean Stapleton, Commissioner Coretta Scott King. Congresswomen included Bella Abzug, Republican Jill Ruckelshaus, Congresswoman Margaret Heckler, Mary Louise, Mary Crisp, Republican Elly Peterson, Democrat Elizabeth Holtzman, Pat Schroeder, Lindy Boggs, Martha Griffiths, and Barbara Jordan. Past, and at the time, current first ladies Rosalynn Carter, Betty Ford, and Lady Bird Johnson were also in attendance at this conference.

All of these women banded together in the Conference to create the 26 planks described above and discuss the rights of women as well as how women should not be discriminated against.

== Outcomes ==
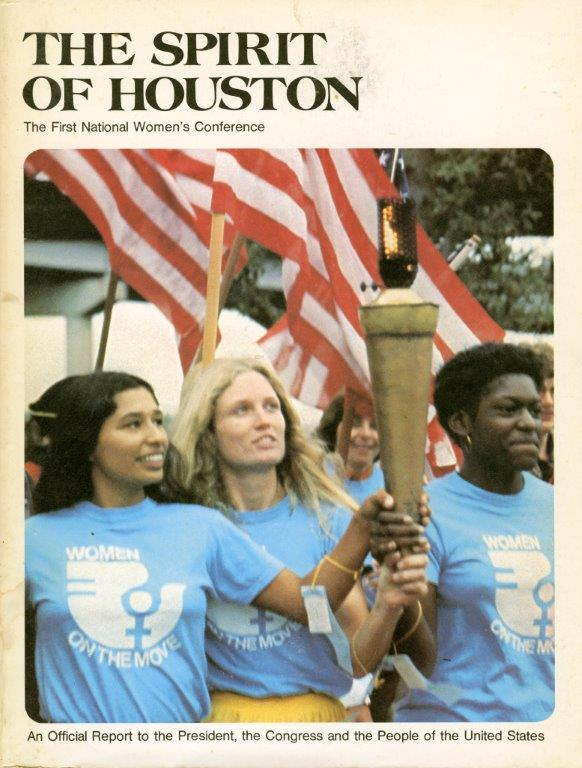
Cover Page of The Spirit of Houston, including the adoption of the 26 planks of the National Plan of Action agreed by delegates

The Spirit of Houston, the official report on the first national women's conference, was submitted to President Carter and Congress in March 1978. A month later, Carter established the National Advisory Committee for Women. The Senate granted a three-year extension for ratification of the ERA within a year of the Houston meeting; this unprecedented move was viewed as a major post-conference achievement, despite the final failure of the amendment in 1982, at which point only 35 of the required 38 states had ratified the amendment. Under political pressure, President Carter fired Abzug from the Commission. No further action was taken by the Administration or Congress on the Plan.

=== National Plan of Action ===
Included in the official conference report, the conference produced a National Plan of Action, a culminating document that comprised a series of demands for more revisions, changes in enforcement, and new policies to improve the living conditions of women in American society. The National Plan of Action included 26 planks representing issues and concerns of interest to American women. The planks were discussed at the state-level women's meetings that preceded the 1977 conference and were then open to debate on the floor at the Houston conference. Seventeen of the planks were adopted by conference delegates by wide majorities, and only 20% of delegates opposed certain planks, representing a consensus among conference delegates and attendees on "what American women need and want to achieve equal rights, equal status, and equal responsibilities with men."

=== Declaration of American Women ===
This plank declared that all women from different backgrounds, cultures, and beliefs deserved the same rights and privileges as men. Equality was an important theme throughout this conference and this plank brought to light the significance of women finally being able to achieve the same privileges as men. At the time, women did not have the right to vote in politics, own housing property, have more power politically, or have the same pay as men in the workplace. The conference concentrated on emphasizing the why women's rights should be implemented into society, and how close women were to achieving these rights.

=== Arts and Humanities ===
Opportunities for manager positions and employment jobs in Arts and Humanities were little to non-existent before this conference. This plank was introduced to point this out to society and hopefully inspire a change. Another issue in this department was that women were having a difficult time obtaining art grants, whereas their male counterparts were finding success in this area. If men were the only ones receiving funding for art projects, how would women ever be able to showcase their talent and education to be able to do the same? Being withheld from receiving art grants would be very detrimental to the progression of an artist's career. This was unfortunately the sad reality many aspiring female artists were having to face and a large reason why this plank was brought up at the conference for debate.

=== Battered Women ===
A common theme in society was violence against women, which because of its prevalence and importance, earned its own plank at the conference for discussion. They voiced that the amount of violence that women were receiving should be stopped/minimized however possible. A solution that came out of the conference was to provide shelters for women who have experienced violence. It was also announced that these programs should be offered with bilingual and cultural options in order for them to be able to help and benefit a larger portion of society.

=== Business ===
At the time of this conference, "less than one percent" of businesses were owned by women. This statistic, among other reasons, gained this issue a spot as a plank at the conference. It was determined that female entrepreneurs in government activities were to be included as a part of government and granted the same opportunities as men to own a business. Additionally, the Executive Order 11625 of October 13, 1971, was put into place to protect minorities and women with small businesses and the benefits of this order were applauded at this conference.

=== Child Abuse ===
Another important issue in society was the problem of child abuse. There really was not any support for the victims of this, so the conference brought up the topic of Child Care to work towards a way to help the victims. The conference determined that the government should provide support, funds, and protective services to help prevent child abuse and assist those affected by it. Also, it was decided that the government should provide equal child care programs for minority women, and improve schools as well as parenthood programs. The "care must be low cost and high quality" in programs in order for Child Care programs to be efficient in assisting the public.

=== Credit ===
This plank argued that women should have equal credit and be informed of their rights pertaining to credit. In order to ensure that women had equal access to credit, regardless of gender, the conference determined that the Equal Credit Opportunity Act needed to be passed. Consequently, the credit issue was the only plank out of all 26 that "was approved unanimously". Everyone at the conference was in agreement that due to the prevalence of this important issue in society, the Equal Credit Opportunity Act needed to be passed immediately.

=== Disabled Women ===
During this time period, society did not give much credit to people that were disabled; additionally, they were not given equal opportunities. The conference discussions led to the decision that disabled women should be able to have the right to education and employment, take care of their children, and be protected from discrimination.

=== Education ===
Due to the discrimination against women's education, the conference brought up this plank to argue for law prohibiting this. Discussion on this plank brought to light the lack of women in educational textbooks and leadership positions in society. In order for young women to have more influential role models to inspire them to benefit future generations, there needed to be more female leadership in education. To ensure that these changes were placed into society, "Title IX must be enforced".

=== Elective and Appointive Office ===
There was a serious lack of women in leadership roles before this conference. Most high status and upper pay grade jobs went to males and this kept women from aspiring to achieve more in the workforce. Instead of settling for the less important jobs and positions, the conference decided that women should be allowed more positions in office and more opportunities to move up in the work force. The prejudice that women belonged at home and not in an office was old-fashioned and the discussions at this conference helped to open people's eyes to the importance of aiming higher in the job arena. This factor would also be crucial in inspiring the younger female generations into believing that they too could succeed in the world and were able to do more than past generations.

=== Employment ===
The employment plank goes along with the elective and appointive office plank; more women should be allowed into the workforce with higher paying positions. The conference decided that there should be no discrimination in employment and all employment should have equal pay, no discrimination for pregnancy, and special attention to minority women.

=== Equal Rights Amendment ===
The ratification of the Equal Rights Amendment which establishes equal rights for all people was discussed. Although this amendment was never ratified, the conference succeeded in earning a three-year extension from the Senate for further discussion on it.

=== Health ===
All women should have equal opportunities to health benefits. Additionally, the food and drug administration should be expanded so that food overall could be safer to consume. Another aspect of this plank the conference deemed important was low-cost reproductive health services as well as research into the effects of women's contraception.

=== Homemakers ===
All women should be equal to their partners when it comes to owning property. If divorced with children, then the children's needs should come first as well. These topics were reviewed by the convention and ultimately ended up deciding that homemakers should have access to social security because a difficult economic situation would arise from a divorce or death of a spouse. If their significant other died and the homemaker did not have social security, they would be left broke.

=== Insurance ===
There should be no discrimination between women and insurance, all insurance should be equally provided to women and insurance.

=== International Affairs ===
Women should be allowed to be more involved with international affairs, especially in the UN Commission and the UN Decade, Country Development, Human Rights, Peace and Disarmament, Education

=== Media ===
All jobs in the media should be able to hire women and women should be given the proper training as well. Additionally, more women should have leadership roles in the media jobs. Federal agencies should look into how mass media impacts sex discrimination.

=== Minority Women ===
Some people at the convention felt that the needs and concerns of women of color were not accurately discussed or solved. For example, attendee, Jane Hickie commented, "I don't believe that Anglo women had heard directly expressed sorts of frustrations from other women who were Mexican American or Puerto Rican Americans, Latinas, ever before". The conference discussed how all minority women should be respected and treated equally, and the government should give them equal rights to work and education, etc. Another aspect that the conference went over about minorities was how all minority cultures should be accepted into the United States.

=== Offenders ===
There should be no discrimination with women in facilities, the health services should be improved, and protection from sexual abuse should be more prominent. Also, children should have special care if their mother is in prison. The mother in prison would not be able to adequately care for her children due to her situation, so an alternate care program would need to be open to the children that this circumstance applied to.

=== Older Women ===
All health and social services should be provided to older women so that they can "live with dignity". These services would allow the older population to live comfortably after they retire and not have to worry about running out of money in their old age.

=== Rape ===
The government should revise their rape laws to have "graduated penalties depend on the amount of coercion, apply assault by or upon both sexes, include all types of sexual assault". The creation of rape centers to help survivors and provide survivor compensation, would make it more accessible for those that have been hurt by rape to get help. In order to make it financially easier on married women that attempt to file a rape accusation against their spouse, the definition of rape should be broadened to include marital rape. Additionally, the government should provide programs to schools to help prevent rape and try to stop this issue from being as prevalent in future generations.

=== Reproductive Freedom ===
The convention argued that women should have reproductive freedom and be able to have private facilities relating to reproductive freedom. Sex-education should be in schools to educate teens to promote STD awareness and hopefully lessen teenage unplanned pregnancies. Also, the convention determined that promoting the backing of Roe v Wade, family planning, and Medicaid payment use for abortion would be in the best interests of everyone.

=== Rural Women ===
Rural women should have the same rights as rural men, as well as establish a rural education policy. The convention was centered around eliminating female discrimination in mostly all debates and planks.

=== Sexual Orientation ===
Discussion of this plank centered on eliminating discrimination based on women's sexual orientation. The topic was intensely debated at the conference before it was eventually passed; never before had lesbian rights been so prominent at an event of this size.

=== Statistics ===
The government should collect data on the basis of sex in the workplace, its impact on jobs, and its effect on women in the workplace so that the information acquired can be studied and improved to help future generations of women.

=== Welfare ===
"The Federal and State governments should assume a role in focusing on welfare and poverty as major women's issues" "Improve social security and retirement systems, raise minimum wage, provide child care and focus on welfare and poverty as major women's issues".

=== Continuing Committee of the Conference ===
Required an establishment of a Committee to assemble a second conference so the progression towards female equality could continue to grow.

=== Education reform ===
Although the Equal Rights Amendment was a significant stride towards demanding the reforms called for in the National Plan of Action, the states ultimately failed to ratify it, and therefore it did not pass into law. Even so, its momentum produced significant ripple effects on the many facets of society that the National Plan of Action sought to change. One such facet is education. Mostly attributed to the outspoken efforts of Betty Friedan, reforms in education policy and enforcement became notably prominent.

Other prominent organizers for education reform from women present at the conference were:

- Patricia Alberjerg Graham, a representative of the National Institute of Education, who advocated for holding the federal government accountable to efforts that reduce inequality in educational opportunities.
- Eileen Shanahan, the assistant Secretary for Public Affairs in the Health, Education and Welfare Department during the Carter administration, who advocated for an emphasis on the ways in which funds are allocated for government programs in education.
- Beth Abramowitz, Assistant Director of the Domestic Council Policy Staff during the Carter administration, who proposed an increase in funds for women involved in higher education and academia.
- Mary F. Berry, Assistant Secretary of Education, who emphasized the potential of the recent Title IX efforts to increase educational opportunities and to assist women to pursue higher education.

== Organizing around identities ==
Concerning the aforementioned rights of disabled, minority, and aging women, the National Plan of Action included separate planks devoted specifically to several such groups of women based on identity. These separate planks were intended to create a space in which women who fit distinctions such as 'Minority Women,' 'Rural Women,' and 'Older Women' could address concerns uniquely related to these identities.

Hundreds of women sought to have their voices heard and to be included in the document. Maxine Waters, a black woman, worked ceaselessly to pass the 'Minority Women' resolution. Waters described the moment of its passing: "Everyone joined in singing 'We Shall Overcome' and women were crying and hugging each other. It was an especially big moment for me because I led off the reading of the resolution we had spent three days and nights drafting." Waters also explained the importance of including minority women's perspectives in all of the planks, ensuring that they did not simply become isolated within the 'Minority Women' section. She wrote: "There is a black perspective in all the feminist issues in the National Plan. Battered women, for example. There's a special black perspective because of the frustration of men in the black community. Black women have been able to get jobs when black men could not, and are often hired under affirmative action plans because they meet two criteria: 1) as women, and 2) as blacks. The frustration of the men in seeking employment added to other sexist socialization, often leads to wife-beating. When I was growing up, I often saw women beaten in the streets."

The diverse nature of the women who attended the Conference contributed to many debates between individuals and between various groups of women. Women had to organize and debate across identity in order to reach solutions. In Sisters of '77, Jane Hickie commented: "I don't believe that Anglo women had heard directly ... those sorts of frustrations from other women who were Mexican American or Puerto Rican American [or] Latinas ever before." Of significant importance to Latina attendees were the discussions revolving around deportations of mothers of American-born children and rights for migrant farm workers. Vera Brown Starr, a member of the Yavapai-Apache Nation and Lorraine White, a Quechan-Pueblo woman of the Fort Yuma Indian Reservation, were especially gratified that the resolution against discrimination included language regarding removal of Native American children from their homes and tribes. Women from Asian-American communities brought up issues regarding sweatshop labor practices and discriminatory practices towards wives of U. S. servicemen.

The Conference thus helped many women achieve a broader intersectional lens through which to view women's issues. Maxine Waters elaborated on her experience with this: "I try to explain to white women the reasons why black women can't support some of the feminist issues. For example, in California, we have a midwifery bill. Midwives were very common in the history of the black community. Because they were too poor to go to the hospital, black women's babies were delivered at home by midwives. The new mothers suffered torn tissues ... the scar tissue is still there ... Black women just don't understand white women who say they don't want to go to sterile hospitals to deliver their babies." These differences emphasized the importance of injecting multiple perspectives into every plank. As stated in the beginning of the 'Minority Women' plank: "Every recommendation of this National Plan of Action shall be understood as applying equally and fully to minority women."

Kimberle Crenshaw explains the necessity of intersectional approaches to address women's issues: "Where systems of race, gender, and class domination converge, as they do in the experiences of battered women of color, intervention strategies based solely on the experiences of women who do not share the same class or race backgrounds will be of limited help to women who because of race and class face different obstacles."

== First Ladies at the conference ==
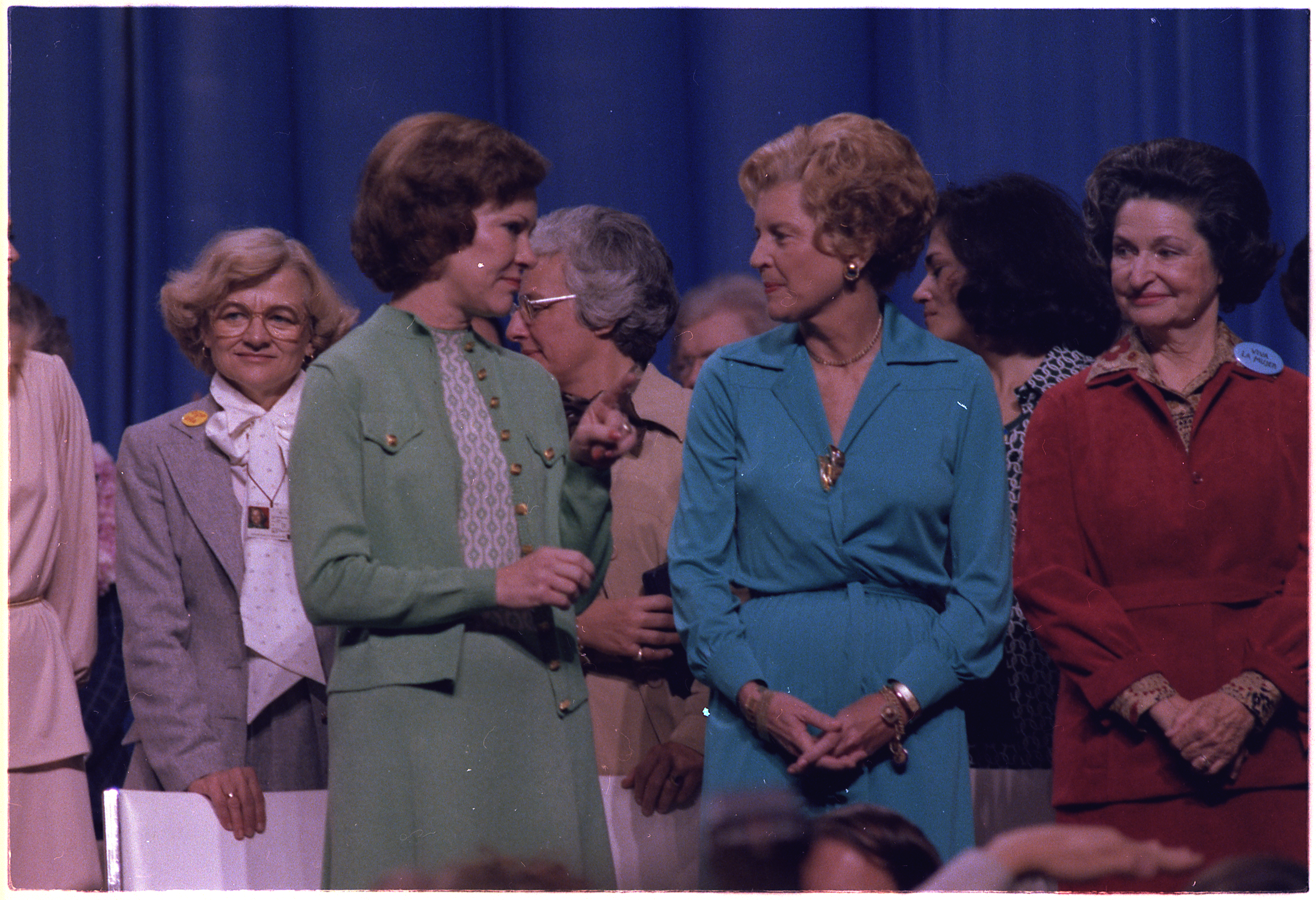
Rosalynn Carter with Betty Ford and Lady Bird Johnson at the 1977 National Women's Conference

The conference was attended by former First Ladies Lady Bird Johnson and Betty Ford, as well as Rosalynn Carter, wife of then-president Jimmy Carter. These women were not the only political figures in attendance, but their position as direct connections to the president made their presence significant.

After President Lyndon B. Johnson entered office, his wife Lady Bird began to focus on social issues of the time rather than social status or being the ideal American housewife. Johnson was a key component in her husband's political career, serving as an adviser and working to present herself in the best way possible. While in the White House, Johnson sought to link her political influence with the traditional roles and responsibilities of the position of First Lady. During President Johnson's second inauguration, she became the first wife to hold the Bible while her husband was sworn in. During her term as First Lady, she focused on beautification of natural areas which stemmed from a lifelong love of nature.

Betty Ford took the office of First Lady in 1974 following the resignation of President Richard Nixon, and would spend the rest of her term pushing for greater rights for women. She was an advocate for the Equal Rights Amendment and campaigned for it whenever her schedule allowed. It was during the Ford administration that the idea for a women's conference began to surface, and many believe that Betty Ford was largely responsible for this. She was the main voice leading her fellow First Ladies to attend the conference, and would continue to use her political power to advocate for women's rights after the conference.

Rosalynn Carter, who was First Lady when the conference took place, was a strong proponent of feminism and the Equal Rights Amendment. She was the first First Lady to use the office in the East Wing, and was a known advocate for several social issues such as mental health and services for senior citizens. She attended the conference with Johnson and Ford, stating that Ford was the major force in bringing them all together. The First Ladies all delivered speeches during the opening ceremony and accepted the torch when it arrived onstage.

== Catholic women at the conference ==
Bette Hillemeier attended the conference as the at-large delegate from Minnesota. She was from Olivia, Minnesota and called herself a “Christian feminist.” She was an example of the intersection and controversy between traditional Catholic values and the women's liberation movement. She was the President of the National Council of Catholic Women in 1978 & 1979. This organization represented 10-14 million Catholic women and advocated for “pro-family” ideals. Hillemeier was “personally opposed to the ERA.” She wanted “equality,... but [thought] existing laws would take care of equal rights if they were enforced.” When she was elected president of the NCCW the organization did not support the ERA while many nuns were in support of ratification. This differing of opinion created tensions within the group. Many nuns supported the ERA as it improved chances for ordination of women as deacons and priests.

=== List of Catholic women attendees ===
- Bette Hellemeier
- Donna Quinn from Chicago Catholic Women
- Sr. Jacinta Mann
- National Council of Catholic Women exhibit
- Leadership Conference of Women Religious
- Sister Jeanne Schweickert
- Mary Helen Madden, Delegate at large for National Council of Catholic Women

== Controversial issues ==
=== Reproductive freedom ===
The 21st plank of the National Action Plan was titled "Reproductive Freedom." In this plank, the women of the National Women's Conference stated their full support of women's reproductive freedom and encouraged all levels of government to comply with the Supreme Court's decisions to guarantee it, such as Roe v. Wade. The plank also included the support of abortion and pregnancy-related care being available to all women as well as encouraging organizations to hold the government responsible for maintaining these principles. The delegates also called for the requirement of consent for all sterilization procedures, concomitant to Department of Health, Education and Welfare's April 1974 regulations. Repeatedly holding all levels of government responsible, they insisted on developing sex education programs and programs for teenage parents in all schools.

Delegates' articulation of women's reproductive freedom encompassed a variety of reproductive rights and family planning issues confronting women around the time of the conference in 1977. The goal of the Reproductive Freedom plank was to ensure that every woman had the fundamental right to access the available means to control her reproduction. Before the legalization of abortion, women, and often disproportionately poor women and women of color, were not able to obtain safe abortions and often resorted to self-procedures. These illegal abortion procedures frequently resulted in complications and sometimes death. In 1972, an estimated 88 abortion-related deaths were reported and about 63 were associated with illegal abortions.

One of the landmark decisions that affected the reproductive freedom movement was Roe v. Wade, in which the Supreme Court held that the constitutional right to privacy includes a women's right to terminate her pregnancy and affirmed the right for a woman to choose abortion. Between the Supreme Court decision in 1973 and the National Women's Conference in 1977, the number of safe and legal abortions steadily increased from 744,600 to 1,270,000; however, in 1977 approximately 560,000 women were not able to obtain the abortion services they needed. Women still faced many obstacles in obtaining abortion services. In 1976, approximately 458,000 women who were able to obtain services had to travel outside of their counties to do so, and 118,000 had to travel to different states.

Though one of the goals of the plank was to ensure the availability of safe and legal abortions, it encompassed a wide variety of concepts that the delegates also recognized as necessary for reproductive freedom. The plank also emphasized the opposition to involuntary sterilization and upheld that spousal consent should not be a requirement for sterilization procedures. Sterilization abuse was an issue that gained attention in the 1970s and activists called on the women's movement to incorporate the concept into their fight.

The 21st plank also presented the need for confidential family-planning services and sex education programs in schools. The plank read "Federal, State, and local governing bodies should take whatever steps necessary to remove existing barriers to family planning services for all teenagers who request them."

Ultimately, the delegates called for the freedom of all women and girls to be able to be informed about and control their own reproduction.

Today, challenges surrounding reproductive freedom are still being addressed, and women are still fighting to obtain the reproductive freedom they called for in 1977. Many of these challenges have centered around abortion debates involving the healthcare provider Planned Parenthood. The debates have become a focal point of the political and legal sphere, with members of Congress deliberating on government funding allocated to the organization. Supporters of reproductive freedom and Planned Parenthood argue that defunding the organization, which provides a variety of healthcare services to women, men, and young people including safe and legal abortions, would detrimentally affect preventative and reproductive care.

=== Liberal feminist analysis of "Plank 8" ===
All of the demands from Plank 8 can be analyzed through a liberal feminist approach. Feminist concerns with education focused on reallocation of government funds. The delegates of the conference decided that the ways in which money was being dispensed into education opportunities for women in academia was not enough. This sentiment is echoed in Adrienne Rich's Claiming an Education, where she writes,

One of the devastating weaknesses of university learning, of the store of knowledge and opinion that has been handed down through academic training, has been its almost total erasure of women's experience and thought from the curriculum, and its exclusion of women as members of the academic community.

Liberal feminist theory grounds itself on the firm belief in education. Donovan says that education is an imperative tool that must be available to women so that they can impact society, without access to it, the patriarchy continues to makes women "civilly dead". In asking for educational opportunities to be expanded to women, the attendees of the 1977 conference were in agreement with Mary Wollstonecraft's thought. Wollstonecraft asserted that only through proper education would women be able to free themselves from patriarchal oppression. The delegates of 1977 were asserting the rights they felt were guaranteed to them as citizens of the United States.

== See also ==
- Seneca Falls Convention
- International Women's Year
- World Conference on Women, 1975
- World Conference on Women, 1980
- World Conference on Women, 1985
- World Conference on Women, 1995
- Sisters of '77
