= Carmen Delgado Votaw =

Puerto Rican politician (1935–2017)

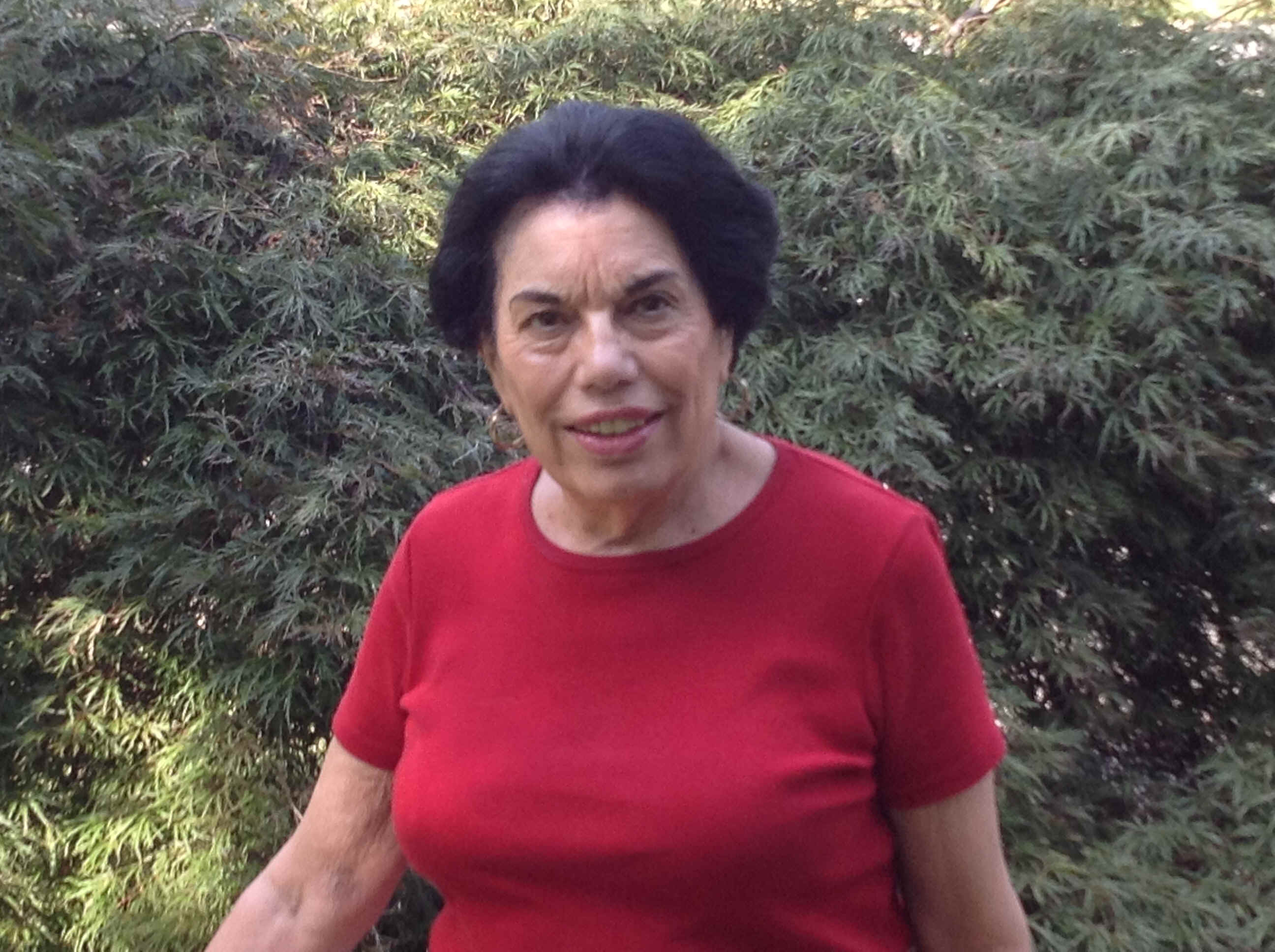
- Carmen Votaw in 2016
- Born: September 29, 1935; Yabucoa, Puerto Rico
- Died: February 18, 2017 (aged 81); Bethesda, Maryland

Carmen Delgado Votaw was a civil rights pioneer, a public servant, an author, and community leader. She earned an associate degree at the University of Puerto Rico and graduated from American University in Washington, D.C., with a Bachelor of Arts in international studies. She was subsequently awarded an honorary doctorate in humanities by Hood College in Frederick, Maryland.

== Career ==
Votaw was appointed by President Jimmy Carter to serve as cochair of the National Advisory Committee for Women. She served as president of the Interamerican Commission of Women of the Organization of American States in 1979–80. The first president of that body, she remains just one of two women from the United States to have served as the commission's president.

During her career, Votaw travelled to more than 80 countries and met with more than 50 heads of state. She was a member of the U.S. delegation to the International Women's Year conference, attending conferences in Mexico City, Copenhagen, Nairobi and Beijing.

Votaw was chief of staff for Puerto Rico's Resident Commissioner Jaime B. Fuster from 1985 to 1991. As the first Hispanic female chief of staff for a Member of Congress, she worked to address the challenges facing 3.5 million Puerto Ricans living on the island and to build a strong network for women in the Federal Government. After leaving the U.S. House of Representatives, she was involved with the Girl Scouts of the USA, United Way of America, and the Alliance for Children and Families.

Votaw was an author of a number of publications on women, including Puerto Rican Women: Mujeres Puertorriquenas, Notable American Women, Libro de Oro, and To Ourselves Be True. These stories highlight the accomplishments of women, particularly Hispanic women, who led remarkable lives and serve as role models for younger women.

== Activism ==
As a defender of civil rights for diverse populations, especially Hispanics, Votaw received the Hispanic Heritage Award for Education, the Mexican American Women's Primeras Award, and numerous awards from NASA, FEW, and national and local civic organizations. Votaw served on the boards of directors of numerous women's organizations, including the National Conference of Puerto Rican Women, which she served as national president and president of the DC chapter, the Overseas Education Fund of the League of Women's Voters, the Girl Scouts of the USA, the International Girl Guides, the National Women's Political Caucus and its Appointments Coalition, the Mid-Atlantic Equity Center, and the National Coalition for Women and Girls in Education. She was also active with the Congressional Hispanic Caucus Institute, the Gala Hispanic Theatre, and the Maryland Women's Heritage Center, and she was a member of the Council on Foreign Relations.

In 1978, Votaw became an associate of the Women's Institute for Freedom of the Press (WIFP). WIFP is an American nonprofit publishing organization. The organization works to increase communication between women and connect the public with forms of women-based media.

== Awards ==
In 1992, Votaw was inducted into the Maryland Women's Hall of Fame for her numerous contributions to the community. For her leadership in education, she was a 1996 recipient of the National Hispanic Heritage Award, presented at the Kennedy Center in Washington, D.C. In 2007, The National Cuban American Women's Association Award. She received the Hispanic Heritage Foundation Award for Education and the Civil Rights Award from NASA. She earned the Foremother Award from the National Center for Health Research. In addition, she was recognized by the National Women's History Project for Distinguished Lifetime Achievement in 2014.

== In popular culture ==
In the 2020 television mini-series Mrs. America she is portrayed by Andrea Navedo.

== Death ==
Carmen Delgado Votaw died from breast cancer on February 18, 2017 in Bethesda, Maryland at the age of 81.
