= Bella Abzug =

American politician (1920–1998)

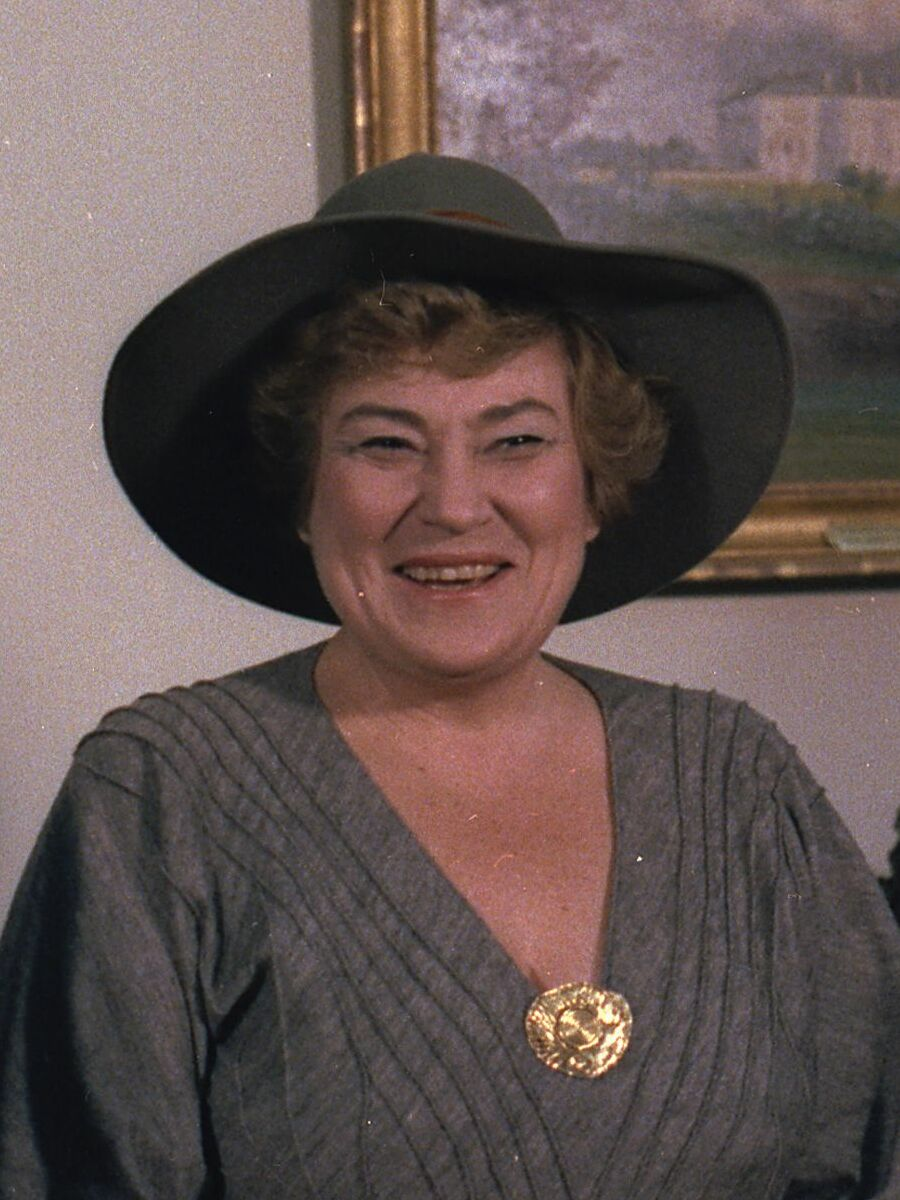
- Abzug in 1978

Member of the U.S. House of Representatives from New York
- In office January 3, 1971 – January 3, 1977
- Preceded by: Leonard Farbstein
- Succeeded by: Ted Weiss
- Constituency: 19th district (1971–1973); 20th district (1973–1977)

Personal details
- Born: Bella Savitsky; July 24, 1920 New York City, U.S.
- Died: March 31, 1998 (aged 77) New York City, U.S.
- Party: Democratic
- Spouse: Martin Abzug (m. 1944; died 1986)
- Children: 2
- Relatives: Arlene Stringer-Cuevas (cousin); Scott Stringer (first cousin once removed)
- Education: Hunter College (BA); Columbia University (LLB); Jewish Theological Seminary

Bella Abzug (/ˈæbzʊɡ/; née Savitzky; July 24, 1920 – March 31, 1998), nicknamed "Battling Bella", was an American lawyer, politician, social activist, and a leader in the women's movement. In 1971, Abzug joined other leading feminists such as Gloria Steinem, Shirley Chisholm, and Betty Friedan to found the National Women's Political Caucus. She was a leading figure in what came to be known as ecofeminism.

In 1970, Abzug's first campaign slogan was, "This woman's place is in the House—the House of Representatives." She was later appointed to co-chair the National Commission on the Observance of International Women's Year created by President Gerald Ford's executive order, presided over the 1977 National Women's Conference, and led President Jimmy Carter's National Advisory Commission for Women. Abzug was a founder of the Commission for Women's Equality of the American Jewish Congress.

== Early life ==
Bella Savitzky was born on July 24, 1920, in New York City. Both of her parents were Yiddish-speaking Jewish immigrants from Chernigov in the Russian Empire (later Ukraine). Her mother, Esther (née Tanklevsky or Tanklefsky), was a homemaker who immigrated from Kozelets in 1902. Her father, Emanuel Savitzky, was a butcher who emigrated in 1906. He ran the Live and Let Live Meat Market on Ninth Avenue. Even in her youth, she was competitive and would beat other children in all sorts of competitions. She ran the cash register at her father's deli as a young girl.

Her religious upbringing influenced her development into a feminist. According to Abzug, "It was during these visits to the synagogue that I think I had my first thoughts as a feminist rebel. I didn't like the fact that women were consigned to the back rows of the balcony." When her father died, Abzug, then 13, was told that her Orthodox synagogue did not permit women to say the (mourners') Kaddish, since that rite was reserved for sons of the deceased. However, because her father had no sons, she went to the synagogue every morning for a year to recite the prayer, defying the tradition of her congregation's practice of Orthodox Judaism.

Abzug graduated from Walton High School in the Bronx, where she was class president. Through high school she took violin lessons and went to Florence Marshall Hebrew High School after classes at Walton. She went on to major in political science at Hunter College of the City University of New York and simultaneously attended the Jewish Theological Seminary of America. At Hunter College, she was student council president and active in the American Student Union. Abzug first met Mim Kelber, who would go on to co-found WEDO with her, at Walton High School and they went on to attend Hunter College with one another. She later earned a law degree from Columbia University in 1944.

== Legal and political career ==
Abzug was admitted to the New York Bar in 1945, at a time when very few women practiced law, and started her career in New York City at the firm of Pressman, Witt & Cammer, frequently working cases in matters of labor law.

As a lawyer, she specialized in labor rights, tenants' rights, and civil liberties cases. Early on, she took on civil rights cases in the Southern United States. She appealed the case of Willie McGee, a black man convicted in 1945 of raping a white woman in Laurel, Mississippi, and sentenced to death by an all-white jury who deliberated for only two-and-a-half minutes. Abzug lost the appeal and the man was executed. Abzug was an outspoken advocate of liberal causes, including the Equal Rights Amendment, and opposition to the Vietnam War as well as the military draft. She worked for the American Civil Liberties Union and the Civil Rights Congress.

Years before she was elected to the House of Representatives, she was an early participant in Women Strike for Peace. Her political stance placed her on the master list of Nixon's political opponents.

During the McCarthy era, she was one of the few legal attorneys willing to openly combat the House Un-American Activities Committee.

== Congressional career ==
I've been described as a tough and noisy woman, a prizefighter, a man-hater, you name it. They call me Battling Bella.

— Bella Abzug, in her 1971 Congress journal, quoted by Braden in Women Politicians and the Media

=== Elections ===
Nicknamed "Battling Bella", in 1970 she challenged the 14-year incumbent Leonard Farbstein in the Democratic primary for a congressional district on Manhattan's West Side. She defeated Farbstein in a considerable upset and then defeated talk show host Barry Farber in the general election. In 1972, her district was eliminated via redistricting and she chose to run against William Fitts Ryan, who also represented part of the West Side, in the Democratic primary. Ryan, although seriously ill, defeated Abzug. However, Ryan died before the general election and Abzug defeated his widow, Priscilla, at the party's convention to choose the new Democratic nominee. In the general election Priscilla Ryan challenged Abzug on the Liberal Party line, but was unsuccessful. She was reelected easily in 1974. For her last two terms, she represented part of the Bronx as well.

=== Tenure ===
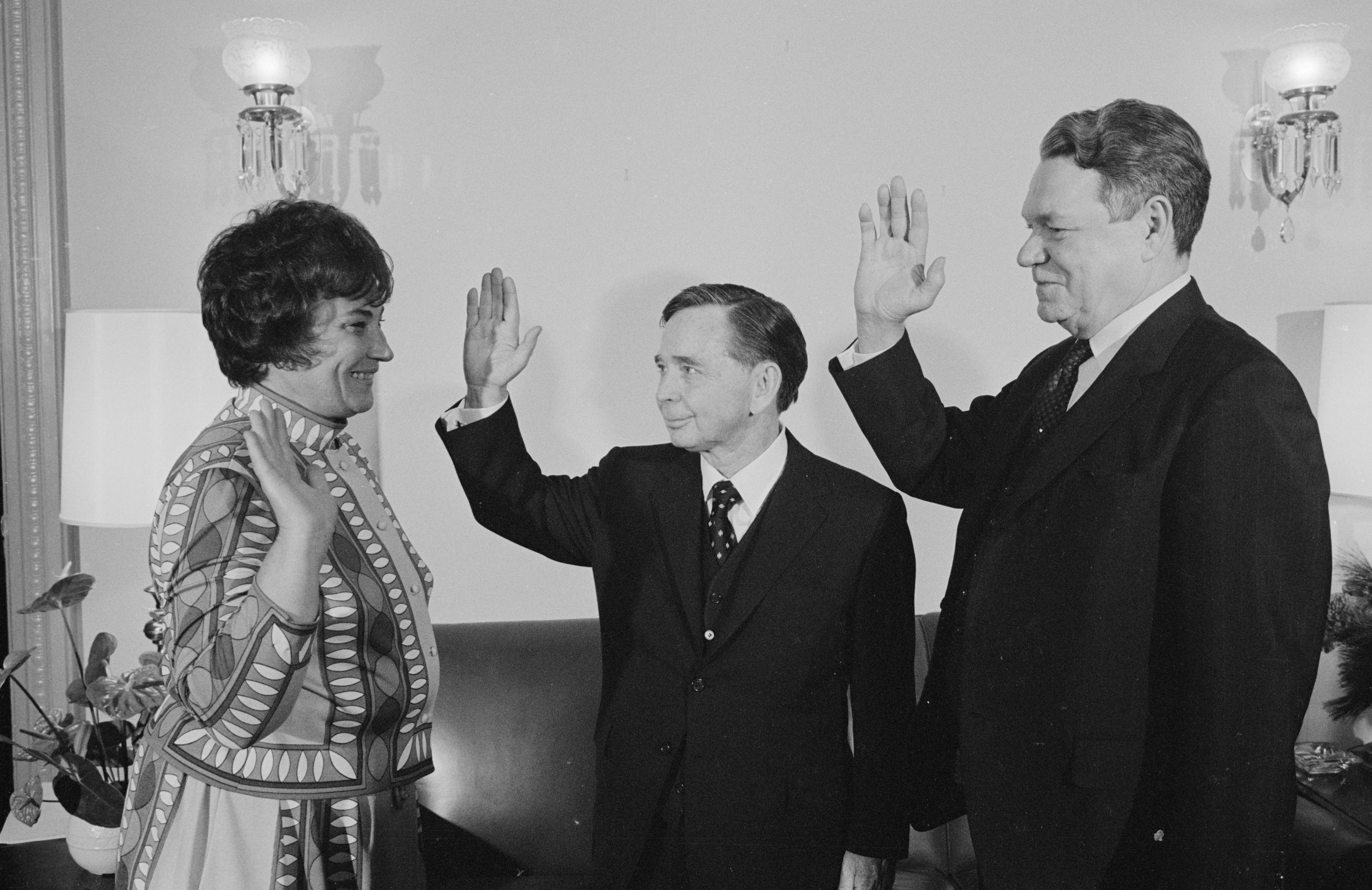
Bella Abzug being sworn in by Carl Albert and Hale Boggs on the opening session of the 92nd Congress, 1971

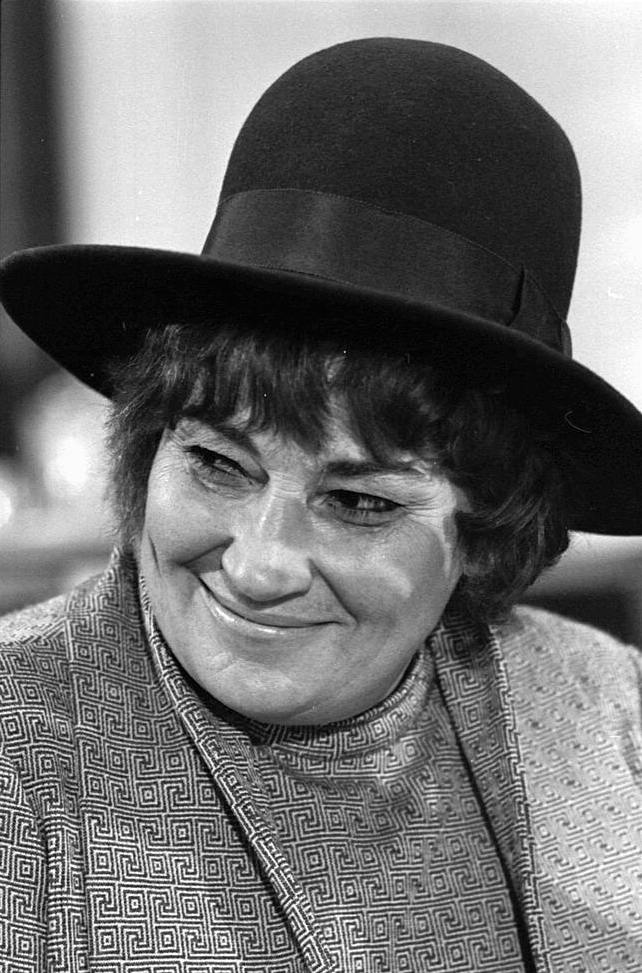
Representative Bella Abzug at press conference for National Youth Conference for '72, November 30, 1971

She was one of the first members of Congress to support gay rights, introducing the first federal gay rights bill, known as the Equality Act of 1974, with fellow Democratic New York City representative Ed Koch, who later became mayor of New York. She also chaired historic hearings on government secrecy, being the chair for the Subcommittee on Government Information and Individual Rights. She was voted by her colleagues as the third most influential member of the House as reported in U.S. News & World Report.

She was the sponsor for the Equality Credit Opportunity Act (ECOA) that made it unlawful to discriminate against any applicant, with respect to any aspect of a credit transaction, on the basis of race, color, religion, national origin, sex, marital status, or age. She was a cosponsor of H.R.13157 that established the Clara Barton National Historic Site, the first National Parks Site dedicated to the achievements of a woman.

She was frequently verbally abusive toward staff members, including referring to Doug Ireland as a "fat cocksucker."

Although hats were banned on the House floor, Abzug was known for her colorful and vibrant hats and was seldom seen without one. After being forced to remove her iconic hat before entering the House floor, Abzug once remarked that she felt "naked and unrecognizable." She famously reminded all who admired them: "It's what's under the hat that counts!"

In February 1975, Abzug was part of a bipartisan delegation sent to Saigon by President Gerald Ford to assess the situation on the ground in South Vietnam near the end of the Vietnam War.

Abzug was a supporter of Zionism. As a young woman she was a member of the Socialist-Zionist youth movement of Hashomer Hatzair. In 1975, she challenged the United Nations General Assembly Resolution 3379 (revoked in 1991 by resolution 46/86), which "determine[d] that Zionism is a form of racism and racial discrimination." Abzug said about the topic, "Zionism is a liberation movement."

=== Campaign for U.S. Senate ===
Abzug's career in Congress ended with an unsuccessful bid for the Democratic nomination for the U.S. Senate in 1976, which she lost by 1.09% to the more moderate Daniel Patrick Moynihan, who had served in both the Nixon and Ford Republican presidential administrations as White House Urban Affairs Advisor, Counselor to the President, United States Ambassador to India, and United States Ambassador to the United Nations. Moynihan would go on to serve four terms in that office.

== Later life and death ==
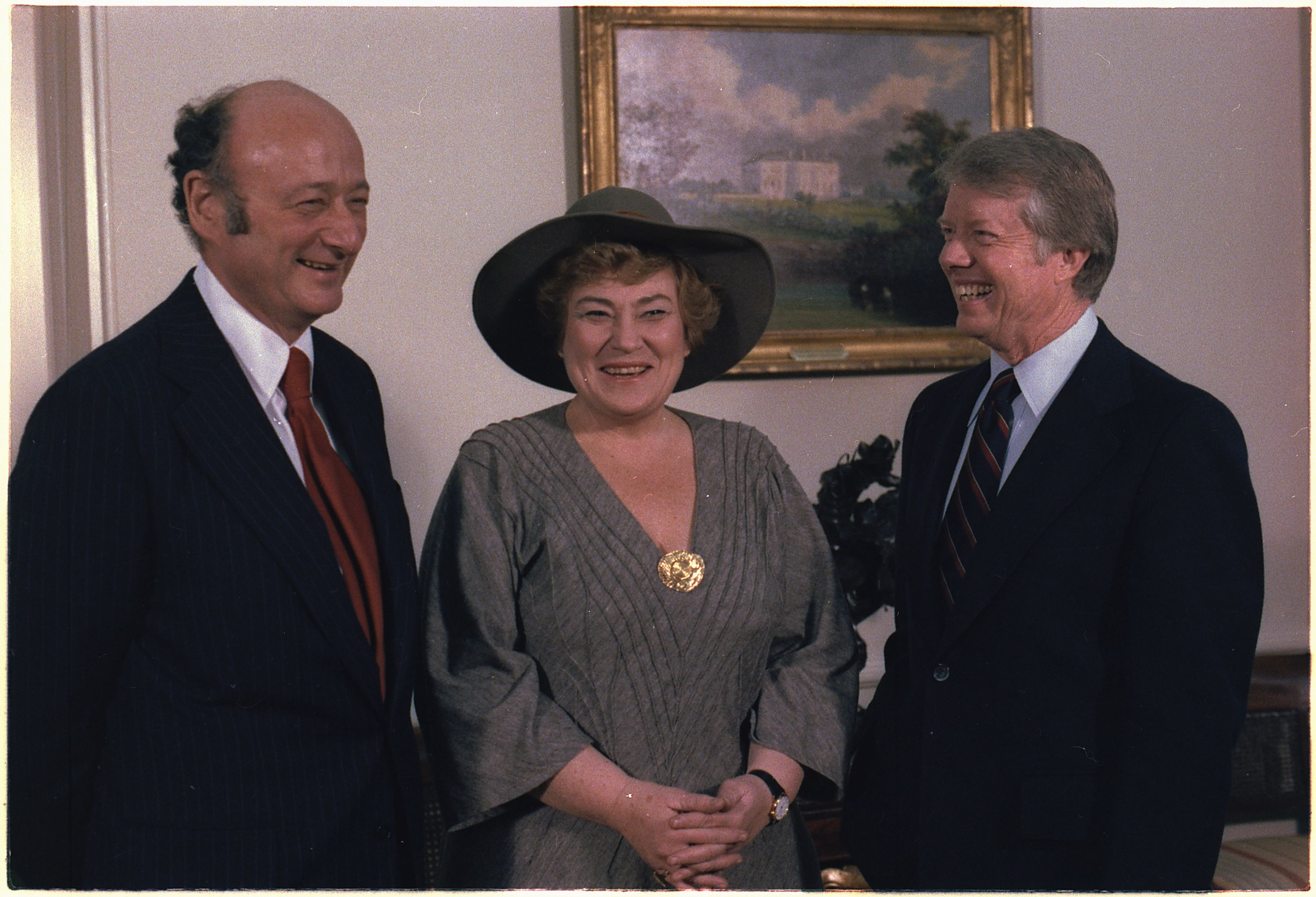
Abzug with New York Mayor Ed Koch (left) and President Jimmy Carter in 1978

Abzug never held elected office again after leaving the House, although she remained a high-profile figure and was again a candidate on multiple occasions. She was unsuccessful in her bid to be mayor of New York City in 1977, as well as in attempts to return to the US House from the East Side of Manhattan in 1978 against Republican Bill Green, and from Westchester County, New York, in 1986 against Joe DioGuardi.

She authored two books, Bella: Ms. Abzug Goes to Washington and The Gender Gap, the latter co-authored with friend and colleague Mim Kelber.

In early 1977, President Jimmy Carter chose a new National Commission on the Observance of International Women's Year and appointed Abzug to head it. Numerous events were held over the next two years, culminating in the 1977 National Women's Conference in November. She would continue this work as one of the two co-chairpersons for the National Advisory Committee for Women until her dismissal in January 1979, which would create a flash point of tension between the Carter administration and feminist organizations in the United States.

Abzug founded and ran several women's advocacy organizations. She founded a grassroots organization called Women USA, and continued to lead feminist advocacy events, for example serving as grand marshal of the Women's Equality Day New York March on August 26, 1980.

In the last decade of her life, in the early 1990s, with Kelber, she co-founded the Women's Environment and Development Organization (WEDO), in their own words "a global women's advocacy organization working towards a just world that promotes and protects human rights, gender equality, and the integrity of the environment." In 1991, WEDO held the World Women's Congress for a Healthy Planet in Miami, where 1,500 women from 83 countries produced the Women's Action Agenda 21.

External videos
- Bella Abzug funeral, Riverside Memorial Chapel, April 2, 1998, C-SPAN

At the UN, Abzug developed the Women's Caucus, which analyzed documents, proposed gender-sensitive policies and language, and lobbied to advance the Women's Agenda for the 21st Century at the 1992 UN Conference on Environment and Development in Rio de Janeiro, as well as women's issues at other events including the Fourth World Conference on Women in Beijing in 1995.

During her last years, Bella kept up her busy schedule of travel and work, even though she traveled in a wheelchair. Bella led WEDO until her death, giving her final public speech before the UN in March 1998.

After battling breast cancer for a number of years, she developed heart disease and died at Columbia-Presbyterian Medical Center on March 31, 1998, from complications following open heart surgery. She was 77. Abzug is interred at Mount Carmel Cemetery, Glendale, Queens County, New York.

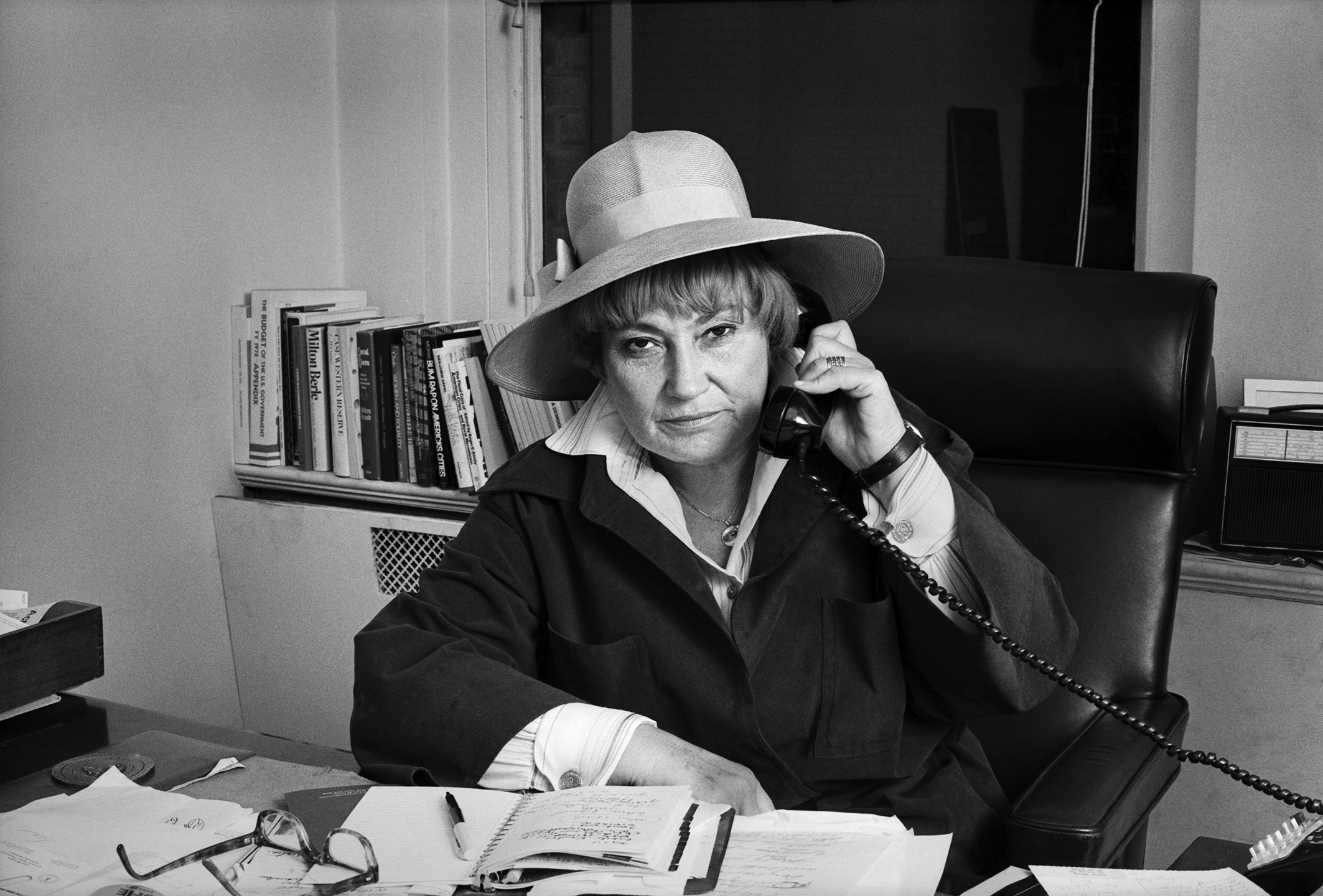
Bella Abzug photographed in New York City 1978 by Lynn Gilbert

== Personal life ==
In 1944, Bella married Martin Abzug, a novelist and stockbroker. They met on a bus in Miami, Florida while heading to a Yehudi Menuhin concert, and they remained married until his death in 1986. They had two daughters.

Abzug was a cousin of the late Arlene Stringer-Cuevas, who served as a New York City Council member, and her son Scott Stringer, a New York City politician. Abzug lived at 20 West 16th Street in Manhattan during the 1960s.

Abzug used to comment that if male lawmakers were going to swim naked in the Congressional swimming pool as was the tradition, then that would be fine with her.

== Honors and legacy ==
In 1974, Jeff London created a sculptural "People Furniture" of Abzug having a good idea.

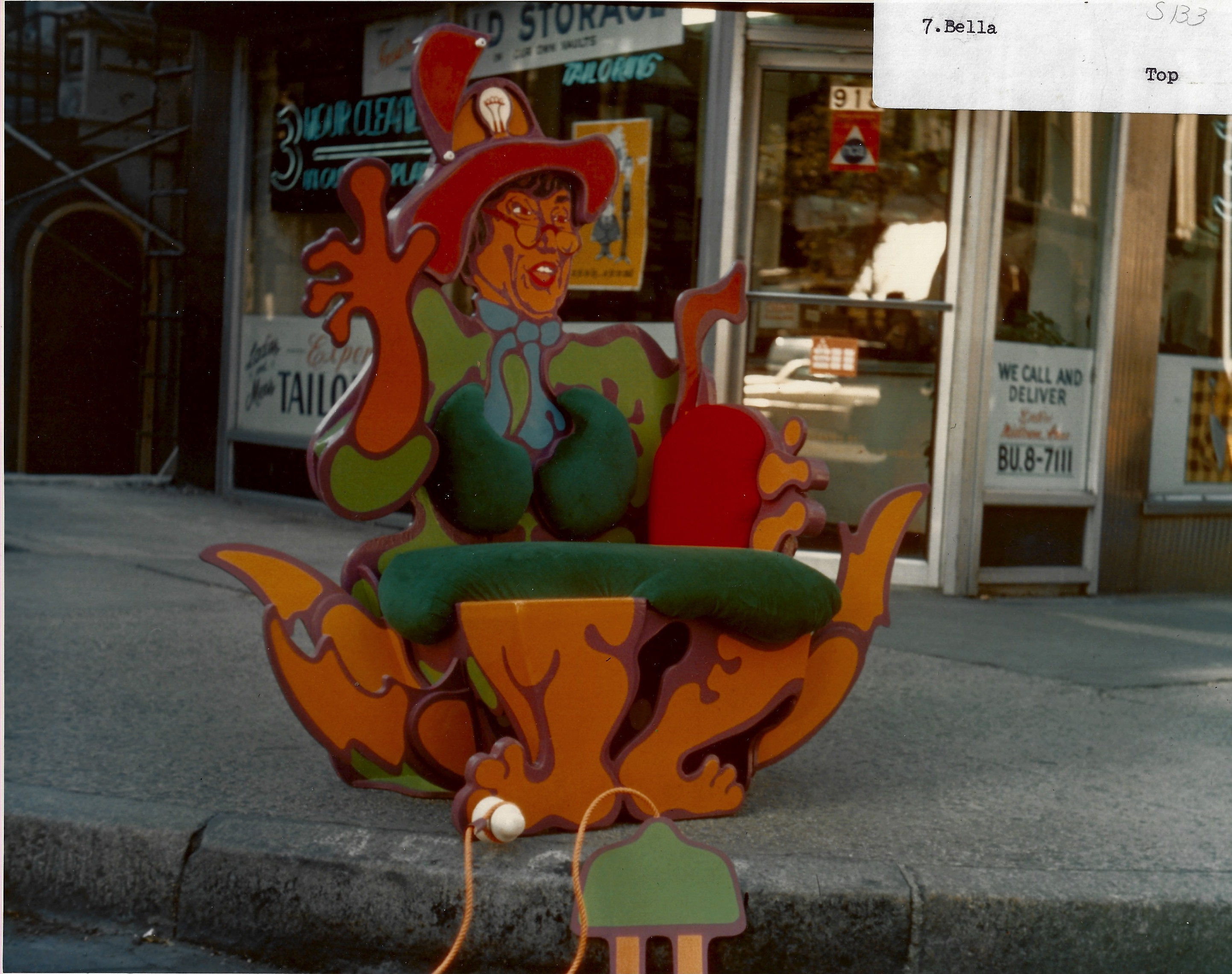
Bella Abzug People Furniture by Jeff London - circa 1974

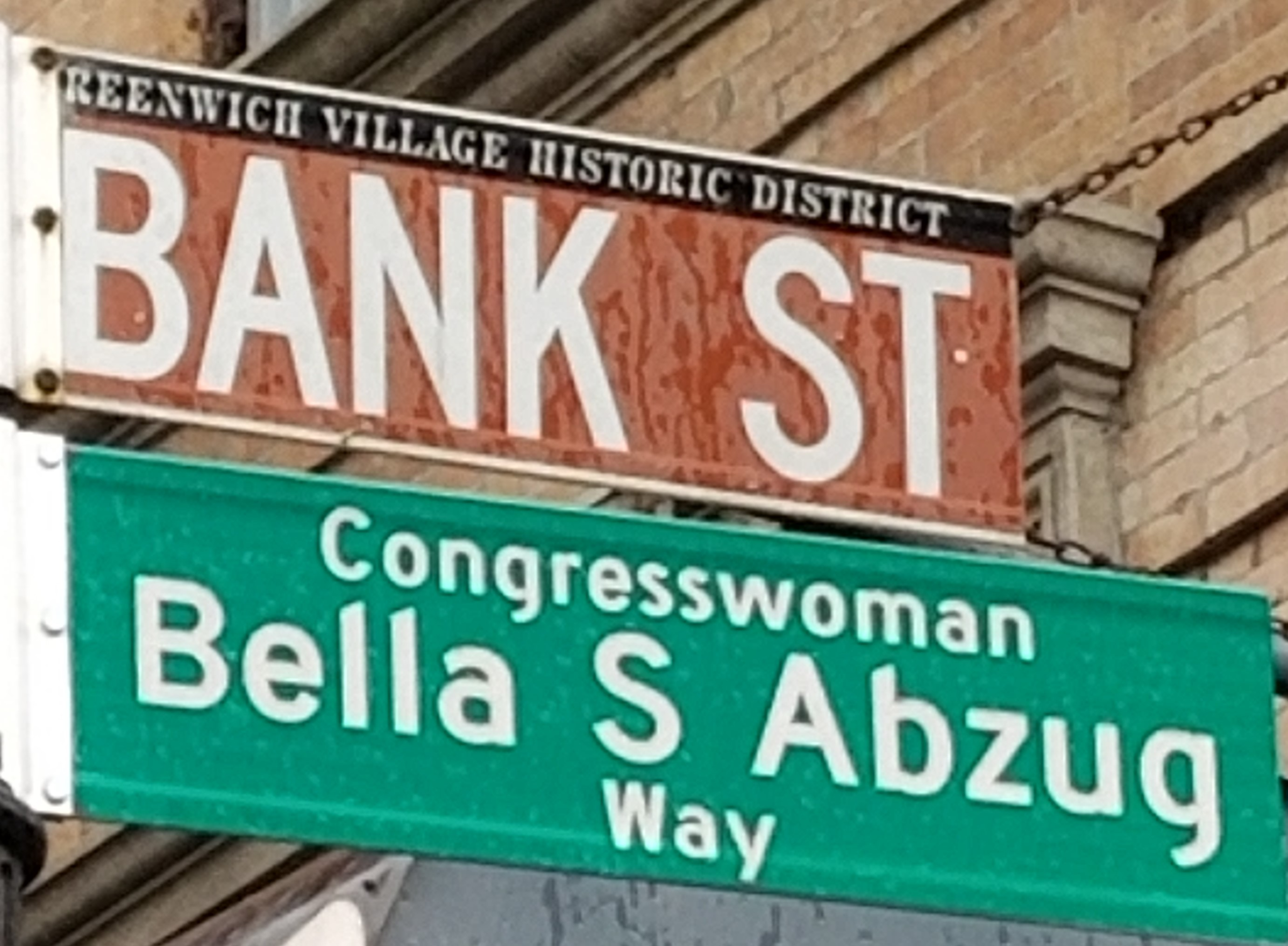
Abzug Way street sign

In 1991, Abzug received the "Maggie" Award, the highest honor of the Planned Parenthood Federation, in tribute to their founder, Margaret Sanger.

In 1994, Abzug was inducted into the National Women's Hall of Fame in Seneca Falls. The same year, she received a medal from the Veteran Feminists of America.

Abzug was honored on March 6, 1997, at the United Nations as a leading female environmentalist. She received the highest civilian recognition and honor at the U.N., the Blue Beret Peacekeepers Award.

In 2004, her daughter Liz Abzug, an adjunct Urban Studies Professor at Barnard College and a political consultant, founded the Bella Abzug Leadership Institute (BALI) to mentor and train high school and college women to become effective leaders in civic, political, corporate and community life. To commemorate the thirtieth anniversary of the first National Women's Conference held in Houston in 1977, over which Bella Abzug had presided, BALI hosted a National Women's Conference on the weekend of November 10–11, 2007, at Hunter College (NYC). Over 600 people from around the world attended. Besides celebrating the 1977 Conference, the 2007 agenda was to address significant women's issues for the 21st century.

In 2017, Time magazine named Abzug one of its 50 Women Who Made American Political History.

In 2024, as part of Women's History Month, NYC Mayor Eric Adams issued a proclamation for her work as a pioneering Congresswoman and feminist Leader, leading the fight for women's and civil rights.

Various landmarks in New York City bear Abzug's name. On March 1, 2019, the recently built Hudson Yards Park was renamed Bella Abzug Park as a tribute to women's history month and its location in her former Congressional district. In New York City's Greenwich Village, a portion of Bank Street is named for Abzug.

== In popular culture ==
She appeared in the WLIW video A Laugh, A Tear, A Mitzvah, as well as in Woody Allen's Manhattan as herself, a 1977 episode of Saturday Night Live, and the documentary New York: A Documentary Film.

In 1979, the Supersisters trading card set was produced and distributed; one of the cards featured Abzug's name and picture.

Abzug appeared in Shirley MacLaine's autobiographical book Out on a Limb (1983). In the 1987 ABC Television mini-series of the same name, Abzug was played by Anne Jackson.

In the 1989 Beastie Boys music video for “Hey Ladies” someone can be seen holding a sign saying “Vote For Bella Abzug”.

In 2019 Manhattan Theater Club, in New York City, produced Bella Bella, a one-character show written and performed by Harvey Fierstein. In the show, Fierstein portrayed Abzug and created dialogue "from the words of Bella Abzug."

In the 2020 FX limited series, Mrs. America, Margo Martindale portrays Abzug. The program examines the unsuccessful multi-year battle to ratify the Equal Rights Amendment. That same year, Bette Midler portrayed Abzug in the film The Glorias.

Abzug was featured in a segment in the 2007 documentary NY77: The Coolest Year in Hell, which explores in depth what life was like during the year 1977 in Manhattan. An excerpt from a press conference of Bella Abzug is used when discussing the differences in political views between Abzug and fellow mayoral candidate Ed Koch. Geraldo Rivera gave detailed commentary on Bella's personality and political style.

Jeff L. Lieberman produced the 2023 documentary Bella! about Abzug's life and political achievements. The film includes interviews with Barbra Streisand, Shirley MacLaine, Hillary Clinton, Lily Tomlin, Nancy Pelosi, Gloria Steinem, Maxine Waters, Phil Donahue, Marlo Thomas, Charles Rangel, David Dinkins, and Renée Taylor.

She is referenced in the Simpsons episode All's Fair in Oven War.

== Selected bibliography ==
=== Books ===
- Abzug, Bella (1972). Ziegler, Mel (ed.). Bella!: Ms. Abzug goes to Washington. New York: Saturday Review Press. ISBN 9780841501546.
- Abzug, Bella; Kelber, Mim (1984). Gender gap: Bella Abzug's guide to political power for American women. Boston: Houghton Mifflin. ISBN 9780395354841.
- Abzug, Bella (1995). Women: looking beyond 2000. New York, New York: United Nations. ISBN 9789211005929.
- Abzug, Bella; Zarnow, Leandra (2019). Battling Bella: The Protest Politics of Bella Abzug. Boston: Harvard University Press. ISBN 9780674737488.

=== Papers ===
- Abzug, Bella; Jain, Devaki (August 1996). Women's leadership and the ethics of development (Gender in Development Monograph Series #4). New York: UNDP United Nations Development Programme. Link.

== See also ==
- Women's Equality Day
- Women in the United States House of Representatives
- List of Jewish feminists
- List of Jewish members of the United States Congress

U.S. House of Representatives
Preceded by Leonard Farbstein	Member of the U.S. House of Representatives from New York's 19th congressional district 1971–1973	Succeeded by Charles Rangel
Preceded by William Ryan	Member of the U.S. House of Representatives from New York's 20th congressional district 1973–1977	Succeeded by Ted Weiss
