= Mrs. America (miniseries) =

2020 American historical drama web television miniseries

- Genre: Historical political drama
- Created by: Dahvi Waller
- Starring: Cate Blanchett; Rose Byrne; Uzo Aduba; Elizabeth Banks; Kayli Carter; Ari Graynor; Melanie Lynskey; Margo Martindale; John Slattery; Jeanne Tripplehorn; Tracey Ullman; Sarah Paulson
- Theme music composer: Ludwig van Beethoven (arranged by Walter Murphy)
- Opening theme: "A Fifth of Beethoven"
- Composer: Kris Bowers
- Country of origin: United States
- No. of episodes: 9

Production
- Executive producers: Stacey Sher; Cate Blanchett; Ryan Fleck; Anna Boden; Coco Francini; Dahvi Waller; Micah Schraft
- Producers: Tanya Barfield; Boo Killebrew; Sharon Hoffman
- Cinematography: Jessica Lee Gagné; Pepe Avila del Pino; Chris Teague
- Editors: Robert Komatsu; Emily E. Greene; Todd Downing
- Running time: 43–54 minutes
- Production companies: Shiny Penny Productions; Dirty Films; Gowanus Projections; Federal Engineering; FXP

Original release
- Network: FX on Hulu
- Release: April 15 – May 27, 2020

Mrs. America is an American political drama television miniseries produced by FX and originally aired on the sister streaming service FX on Hulu. Created and co-written by Davhi Waller and directed by Anna Boden and Ryan Fleck, Amma Asante, Laure de Clermont-Tonnerre, and Janicza Bravo, the series details the unsuccessful political movement to pass the Equal Rights Amendment and the efforts of conservative activist Phyllis Schlafly in the 1970s. It features a large ensemble cast led by Cate Blanchett, Rose Byrne, Uzo Aduba, Elizabeth Banks, Margo Martindale, John Slattery, Tracey Ullman, and Sarah Paulson.

The nine-part series premiered in the United States on April 15, 2020, to widespread critical acclaim. At the 72nd Primetime Emmy Awards, it received ten nominations including Outstanding Limited Series and Outstanding Writing, as well as acting nominations for Blanchett, Aduba, Martindale, and Ullman, with Aduba winning Outstanding Supporting Actress in a Limited Series or Movie. In January 2021, the American Film Institute named Mrs. America one of the ten best television shows of 2020.

== Premise ==
Mrs. America dramatizes the story of the movement to ratify the Equal Rights Amendment, and the unexpected backlash led by conservative activist Phyllis Schlafly. Through the eyes of the women of that era – both Schlafly and prominent second-wave feminists including Gloria Steinem, Betty Friedan, Shirley Chisholm, Bella Abzug, and Jill Ruckelshaus – the series explores how one of the toughest battlegrounds in the culture wars of the 1970s helped give rise to the Moral Majority and permanently shifted the American political landscape.

Every episode contains an opening message which acknowledges that some scenes and characters are fictionalized for creative purposes.

== Cast and characters ==
=== Main ===
- Cate Blanchett as Phyllis Schlafly, a prominent conservative activist and lawyer who founded the "STOP ERA" campaign (later the Eagle Forum).
- Rose Byrne as Gloria Steinem, a prominent feminist, journalist, and sociopolitical activist who co-founded the National Women's Political Caucus and Ms. magazine.
- Uzo Aduba as Shirley Chisholm, a politician, educator, and author who was the first black candidate for a major party's nomination for President of the United States, and one of the first two women to run for the Democratic Party's nomination.
- Elizabeth Banks as Jill Ruckelshaus, a Republican feminist activist, co-founder of the National Organization for Women (NOW) and the National Women's Political Caucus, and head of the White House Office of Women's Programs.
- Kayli Carter as Pamela, a fictional composite character; a young housewife and member of Schlafly's "STOP ERA" campaign.
- Ari Graynor as Brenda Feigen, a feminist activist and attorney, the National Legislative Vice President of NOW.
- Melanie Lynskey as Rosemary Thomson, a conservative activist, member of the "STOP ERA" campaign and the head of Schlafly's Eagle Foundation.
- Margo Martindale as Bella Abzug, a US congresswoman and prominent feminist activist, co-founder of NOW and the National Women's Political Caucus, and leader of President Carter’s National Advisory Commission for Women.
- John Slattery as Fred Schlafly, Phyllis's husband; a wealthy lawyer, conservative activist, and ardent anti-communist.
- Jeanne Tripplehorn as Eleanor Schlafly, Phyllis' sister-in-law; a conservative activist, and ally of the "STOP ERA" campaign.
- Tracey Ullman as Betty Friedan, a prominent feminist activist, author of The Feminine Mystique, and co-founder of NOW and the National Women's Political Caucus.
- Sarah Paulson as Alice Macray, a fictional composite character intended to represent the conservative women that followed Schlafly's "STOP ERA" campaign; a housewife and friend of Phyllis.

=== Recurring ===
- Niecy Nash as Flo Kennedy, a lawyer, feminist, and civil rights advocate who co-founded the National Women's Political Caucus.
- Bria Henderson as Margaret Sloan-Hunter, a feminist and civil rights advocate, and editor of Ms. magazine.
- Annie Parisse as Midge Costanza, a social and feminist activist, and Presidential advisor to President Carter.
- Anna Douglas as Jean O'Leary, a feminist and gay rights activist, with whom Midge is in a closeted relationship.
- Melissa Joyner as Audrey Rowe Colom, a feminist and civil rights activist, and Chairperson of the National Women's Political Caucus.
- Andrea Navedo as Carmen Delgado Votaw, a civil rights activist, and co-chair of the National Advisory Committee on Women.
- Jay Ellis as Franklin Thomas, an attorney and businessman who has a romantic relationship with Gloria Steinem.
- David Eisner as Martin Abzug, Bella's husband.
- John Bourgeois as George McGovern, a U.S. senator, and the Democratic Party presidential nominee in the 1972 presidential election.
- James Marsden as Phil Crane, a Republican politician, U.S. congressman, and ally of the "STOP ERA" campaign.
- Cindy Drummond as Lottie Beth Hobbs, an Evangelical conservative activist and author, and member of "STOP ERA" and Eagle Forum.
- Teresa Pavlinek as Ann Patterson, a conservative housewife and member of the "STOP ERA" campaign.
- Melinda Page Hamilton as Mary Frances, a conservative housewife and president of the Louisiana chapter of the "STOP ERA" campaign.
- Ben Rosenfield as John Schlafly, Phyllis and Fred's eldest child and son, a closeted homosexual.
- Brendan Cox as Bruce Schlafly, Phyllis and Fred's second child
- Olivia Scriven as Phyl 'Liza' Schlafly, Phyllis and Fred's eldest daughter
  - Lucy Margey as child Phyl
- Marcia Bennett as Odile Stewart, Phyllis Schlafly's mom
- Novie Edwards as Willie B. Reed, the Schlafly family's housekeeper

=== Guest ===
- Jake Lacy as John Stanley Pottinger, a politician, and Assistant United States Attorney General for the Civil Rights Division.
- Norm Lewis as Ron Dellums, a U.S. congressman and friend of Shirley Chisholm.
- Adam Brody as Marc Fasteau, a lawyer, activist, the husband of Brenda Feigen, and the author of The Male Machine.
- Bobby Cannavale as Tom Snyder, a television personality, and the host of The Tomorrow Show.
- Josh Hamilton as William Ruckelshaus, a Republican politician and the husband of Jill Ruckelshaus.
- Tara Nicodemo as Ruth Bader Ginsburg, a prominent lawyer, and co-founder of the Women's Rights Law Reporter and the ACLU Women's Rights Project.
- Roberta Colindrez as Jules, a photographer who has an adulterous relationship with Brenda Feigen.
- Miriam Shor as Natalie Gittelson, an editor for Harper's Bazaar magazine and the best friend of Betty Friedan.
- Julie White as an ERA supporter that Alice meets at the bar of the 1977 National Women's Conference.
- Dan Beirne as Hamilton Jordan, a politician and Chief of Staff to President Carter.
- Hannah Galway as Elizabeth Ray, a congressional secretary who is sexually abused by her boss.
- Tom O'Keefe as Phil Donahue.
- Geordie Johnson as Illinois politician Henry Hyde.

== Episodes ==
No.	Title	Directed by	Written by	Original release date	Prod. code
1	"Phyllis"	Anna Boden & Ryan Fleck	Dahvi Waller	April 15, 2020	101
Phyllis Schlafly, a conservative advocate for Barry Goldwater and perennial candidate for Congress, refrains from running again amid a slew of harassment by her male colleagues and lack of support by her husband, Fred. Instead she sets out on a new campaign: stopping the Equal Rights Amendment from being ratified in 38 states.
2	"Gloria"	Anna Boden & Ryan Fleck	Dahvi Waller	April 15, 2020	102
Gloria Steinem channels her reputation as editor-in-chief of Ms. magazine to lead the fight for women’s rights as co-founder of the National Women's Political Caucus, including abortion and equal pay, while Schlafly uses her grassroots campaign to stop ERA ratification in her home state of Illinois.
3	"Shirley"	Amma Asante	Tanya Barfield	April 15, 2020	103
Shirley Chisholm, an African-American congresswoman and Presidential candidate, vows to stay in the race for nomination come the 1972 Democratic National Convention, while Steinem lobbies for abortion rights on the floor. Meanwhile, Schlafly struggles to make the newly-named STOP ERA campaign a national convention while watering down racial overtones from members of the Southern States.
4	"Betty"	Amma Asante	Boo Killebrew	April 22, 2020	104
Betty Friedan, author of The Feminine Mystique and founder of the National Organization for Women (NOW), challenges Schlafly to a debate on the ERA against Steinem and NOW’s advice. During the debate, Friedan is seemingly winning, until Schlafly gets under her skin and Friedan lashes out at her.
5	"Phyllis & Fred & Brenda & Marc"	Laure de Clermont-Tonnerre	Micah Schraft and April Shih	April 29, 2020	105
Feminist couple Brenda and Marc Feigen-Fasteau come to terms with Brenda’s pregnancy and her experimentation with another woman while debating traditional couple Fred and Phyllis Schlafly, who come to terms with Phyllis’s campaign and return to law school. During the debate, Phyllis tries to cite a case to bolster her position, only to have it destroyed by Brenda when Phyllis cannot come up with the proper case cite. Phyllis, as a result, vows to herself to go to law school.
6	"Jill"	Laure de Clermont-Tonnerre	Sharon Hoffman	May 6, 2020	106
Jill Ruckelshaus, a Pro-ERA and Pro-Choice Republican, battles to unify the party against Schlafly’s growing Anti-ERA and Pro-Life movement amid the 1976 Republican National Convention. Both Jill and Bill Ruckelshaus are expecting Gerald Ford to name Bill as his VP running mate, and are later disappointed when they find out Ford has chosen Bob Dole instead. Chisholm attempts to form a committee tackling sexual harassment among congressmen and their women employees, much to the displeasure of Bella Abzug. Schlafly seeks to expand her mailing list by joining forces with another organization that wishes to push a stronger pro-life and anti-gay agenda.
7	"Bella"	Anna Boden & Ryan Fleck	Micah Schraft	May 13, 2020	107
Right after giving a speech at a luncheon, Schlafly is hit with a pie in the face by a male waiter, damaging her left eye. Bella Abzug, former congresswoman and co-founder of the National Women's Political Caucus comes off a losing Senate election in 1976 to run the National Women's Conference in Houston the following November, while many anti-ERA women attempt to get in as delegates. Meanwhile, Schlafly attempts to form a counter-rally to take place right after the Houston conference.
8	"Houston"	Janicza Bravo	Dahvi Waller	May 20, 2020	108
Without Schlafly for the first time, the STOP ERA women are invited to the 1977 National Women's Conference in Houston to defend their cause. Alice is overwhelmed by her surroundings, goes to the hotel bar where she makes friends with a woman who appears to be a bedfellow but is actually in the feminist camp. The woman gives her a pill to relax which is really LSD. Alice then "trips" and appears to be questioning her own beliefs regarding women's rights, and the tactics the STOP ERA group are using to try to win.
9	"Reagan"	Anna Boden & Ryan Fleck	Dahvi Waller and Joshua Allen Griffith	May 27, 2020	109
Carter fires Abzug as head of his women's rights commission, much to the anger of Steinem and others working with her. With the original ERA ratification deadline extended, Schlafly sets her sights on continuing to fight it, as well as trying to angle for a Cabinet position while helping Reagan in 1980. After winning, Reagan calls Schlafly to say he is appreciative of her help, but cannot offer her a position in his new administration because she is too polarizing.

== Production ==
=== Development ===
Mrs. America was created and co-written by Emmy Award winning Canadian writer Dahvi Waller, who previously had writing credits on acclaimed television shows such as Mad Men and Halt and Catch Fire. The head of FX, John Landgraf, had become interested in the reappraisal of historical events "embedded in America’s collective consciousness" after Ryan Murphy originally sketched out the plot of American Crime Story. Landgraf saw Mrs. America and its portrayal of the battle surrounding the Equal Rights Amendment as having a "direct bearing on the political climate in which we find ourselves today." He also commented that, "It's a wonderful thing when any creator, any broadcaster can sort of find that place where it’s not homework to watch something, yet it has an enormous amount of artistic or educational value."

Waller said that, while researching and developing the series, she realized that (in relation to equal rights) the U.S. had not progressed as much in the last 50 years as she initially thought. She commented that Mrs. America serves "as an origin story of today’s culture wars — you can draw a direct line from 1970 to today through Phyllis Schlafly and really understand how we became such a divided nation." Cate Blanchett, who served as an executive producer on the series as well as starring as Schlafly, also echoed the sentiment and the timeliness of the series, saying, "In the process of developing it — like with Roe v. Wade — there were questions with 'Is this really relevant, do we really need a whole episode about this?' It seemed that every passing day in the development process and certainly during shooting, right up to Virginia debating the ERA right now, it became like Groundhog Day; the literal discussions that we were having during 1971, 1972 going through the series were constantly popping up in the media."

"I don't think we benefit from portraying the side we don’t agree with as monsters; I don't think we benefit from portraying heroes as perfect."

— Series creator Dahvi Waller on the decision to "create a series with shades of grey" that didn't take a side.

Waller also desired to highlight the beginnings of intersectional feminism within the series through the character of Shirley Chisholm, played by Uzo Aduba. Chisholm was the first black female candidate in history to run for the U.S. presidency. Waller commented, "One of the great things about this period is you have the birth of a lot of things, including intersectional feminism and LGBTQ rights. In episode 3, Shirley is really the beginning of the birth of intersectional feminism, and it's a messy beginning. I think the women's movement was really growing in this time period and learning lessons."

On October 30, 2018, it was announced that FX had given the show a series order. The nine-episode miniseries was written by Dahvi Waller, Tanya Barfield, Boo Killebrew, Micah Schraft, April Shih, Sharon Hoffman, and Joshua Allen Griffith and directed by Anna Boden and Ryan Fleck, Amma Asante, Laure de Clermont-Tonnerre, and Janicza Bravo. Waller also served as an executive producer alongside Stacey Sher, Cate Blanchett, Ryan Fleck, Anna Boden, and Coco Francini.

The first official images of the series were released on August 6, 2019. In November 2019, it was announced the show would premiere on Hulu instead of FX, as part of "FX on Hulu". In January 2020, it was announced that the series would premiere on April 15, 2020.

=== Casting ===
Alongside the series order, Cate Blanchett was announced to star in October 2018. In May 2019, Uzo Aduba, Rose Byrne, Kayli Carter, Ari Graynor, Melanie Lynskey, James Marsden, Margo Martindale, Sarah Paulson, John Slattery, Jeanne Tripplehorn and Tracey Ullman were added to the series. In June 2019, Elizabeth Banks was cast to star while Bria Henderson was set to recur. Niecy Nash was cast in a recurring role in August, with Olivia Scriven cast in October.

=== Filming ===
Principal photography for the series took place from June 19 to November 1, 2019, in Toronto, Ontario.

=== Music ===
The musical score was composed by American composer Kris Bowers. The opening theme, "A Fifth of Beethoven", was chosen by the show's music supervisor, Mary Ramos, because "It represents both sides of the story. Phyllis and her conservative friends listen to classical music most of the time, so it’s that, combined with the sexiness and freedom of the feminists, all epitomized in one song — the disco version of Beethoven’s Fifth."

The series also prominently features many hit songs from the 1970s, including tracks by Donna Summer, Golden Earring, Burt Bacharach, The Kinks, Linda Ronstadt, and The Runaways.

== Release ==
In the United States, the first three episodes premiered on Hulu under the FX on Hulu label on April 15, 2020. In India, the series started streaming on Hulu and FX's corporate sibling Disney+ Hotstar on April 16, 2020. In Australia, the series debuted on April 21, 2020 on Foxtel's Fox Showcase network, and was available on demand via its Foxtel Now and Binge services. However, as Disney now fully owned the FX titles after their output deals with Foxtel expired, the series was pulled out of both Foxtel and Binge and was relocated to Disney+ via Star content hub. In the United Kingdom, the series aired on BBC Two and was available for streaming on BBC iPlayer beginning on July 8, 2020.

== Reception ==
=== Audience viewership ===
According to Whip Media's TV Time, Mrs. America was the 2nd most anticipated new television series of April 2020. In January 2021, it was reported that Mrs. America was one of FX on Hulu’s most-watched series to date.

=== Critical response ===
Mrs. America received widespread critical acclaim. On Rotten Tomatoes, the miniseries holds an approval rating of 96% based on 96 reviews, with an average rating of 8.29/10. The website's critical consensus states: "Mrs. America captures the complicated life and times of Phyllis Schlafly with poise and style to spare, brought to vivid life by a superb ensemble led by another masterful performance from Cate Blanchett." On Metacritic, it has a weighted average score of 87 out of 100 based on 41 reviews, indicating "universal acclaim".

James Poniewozik, writing for The New York Times, praised the series, calling it "breathtaking" and "a meticulously created and observed mural that finds the germ of contemporary America in the striving of righteously mad women." Poniewozik also praised the performances of the cast, singling out Cate Blanchett ("Her final scene, wordless and devastating, might as well end with Blanchett being handed an Emmy onscreen"), Tracey Ullman ("Ullman is tsunamic as Friedan, the outspoken Feminine Mystique author now raging for relevance in the current wave of feminism"), and Margo Martindale ("a tornado in a hat, a piquantly funny force of personality").

Judy Berman, writing for Time, reviewed the series positively, writing "Creator Dahvi Waller, whose history as a writer for Mad Men and Halt and Catch Fire is evident in Mrs. America's vivid, complex depiction of our country's recent past". Berman also praised the show's writers, stating "This degree of moral, political and philosophical complexity is what differentiates Mrs. America from so many other recent dramatizations of women’s movements past".

Inkoo Kang, writing for The Hollywood Reporter, called the series "a tremendously executed balancing act" and stated that "there's no denying that Mrs. America makes history come alive, in thoughtful and achingly real detail", also praising the performances of the central cast.

=== Negative reviews ===
The series was criticized by Gloria Steinem and Eleanor Smeal who called it ridiculous and described it as lacking in historical accuracy. They argued the series portrayed the fight for the ERA as a catfight between women instead of showing that lobbyists protecting the financial interests of insurance and other companies affected by the change were far more influential in preventing the law from being passed. They believe this affects women's ability to believe they can affect change. Steinem and Smeal's comments were later disagreed with by fellow second-wave feminist Brenda Feigen, who called the series "extraordinary" and stated that, in her view, the nuance of the characters were portrayed very accurately. The show was also accused of being one-sided and inventing details to present Schlafly in an unsympathetic light, including from Schlafly's daughter Anne Cori, who denounced Blanchett and called the portrayal of her family inaccurate.

== Accolades ==
Year	Award	Category	Nominee(s)	Result	Ref.
2020	Black Reel Television Awards	Outstanding Supporting Actress, TV Movie/Limited Series	Uzo Aduba	Nominated	
2020	Black Reel Television Awards	Outstanding Writing, TV Movie/Limited Series	Tanya Barfield (for "Shirley")	Nominated	
2020	Dorian TV Awards	Best TV Movie or Limited Series	Mrs. America	Nominated	
2020	Dorian TV Awards	Best TV Performance - Actress	Cate Blanchett	Nominated	
2020	Dorian TV Awards	Wilde Wit Award	Cate Blanchett	Nominated	
2020	Dorian TV Awards	Best Supporting TV Performance - Actress	Uzo Aduba	Nominated	
2020	Gold Derby TV Awards	Limited Series	Mrs. America	Nominated	
2020	Gold Derby TV Awards	Limited/Movie Actress	Cate Blanchett	Nominated	
2020	Gold Derby TV Awards	Limited/Movie Supporting Actress	Rose Byrne	Nominated	
2020	Gold Derby TV Awards	Limited/Movie Supporting Actress	Sarah Paulson	Nominated	
2020	Gold Derby TV Awards	Ensemble Of The Year	Cast of Mrs. America	Nominated	
2020	Hollywood Critics Association Midseason Awards	Best New Streaming Series (Drama)	Mrs. America	Won	
2020	Primetime Emmy Awards	Outstanding Limited Series	Dahvi Waller, Stacey Sher, Coco Francini, Cate Blanchett, Anna Boden, Ryan Fleck, Micah Schraft, James W. Skotchdopole, Tanya Barfield and Boo Killebrew	Nominated	
2020	Primetime Emmy Awards	Outstanding Lead Actress in a Limited Series or Movie	Cate Blanchett	Nominated	
2020	Primetime Emmy Awards	Outstanding Supporting Actress in a Limited Series or Movie	Uzo Aduba (for "Shirley")	Won	
2020	Primetime Emmy Awards	Outstanding Supporting Actress in a Limited Series or Movie	Margo Martindale (for "Bella")	Nominated	
2020	Primetime Emmy Awards	Outstanding Supporting Actress in a Limited Series or Movie	Tracey Ullman (for "Betty")	Nominated	
2020	Primetime Emmy Awards	Outstanding Writing for a Limited Series or Movie	Tanya Barfield (for "Shirley")	Nominated	
2020	Primetime Creative Arts Emmy Awards	Outstanding Casting for a Limited Series or Movie	Carmen Cuba and Robin Cook	Nominated	
2020	Primetime Creative Arts Emmy Awards	Outstanding Period Costumes	Bina Daigeler, Erin Byrne, Bettina Seifert, Erika Larner, Mila Hermanovski and Eileen Kennedy (for "Shirley")	Nominated	
2020	Primetime Creative Arts Emmy Awards	Outstanding Music Composition for a Limited Series, Movie or Special (Original Dramatic Score)	Kris Bowers (for "Reagan")	Nominated	
2020	Primetime Creative Arts Emmy Awards	Outstanding Single-Camera Picture Editing for a Limited Series or Movie	Robert Komatsu (for "Phyllis")	Nominated	
2020	TCA Awards	Program of the Year	Mrs. America	Nominated	
2020	TCA Awards	Outstanding Achievement in Movie or Miniseries	Mrs. America	Nominated	
2020	TCA Awards	Individual Achievement in Drama	Cate Blanchett	Nominated	
2021	AACTA International Awards	Best Actress in a Series	Cate Blanchett	Nominated	
2021	AARP Movies for Grownups Awards	Best TV Movie/Limited Series	Mrs. America	Nominated	
2021	AARP Movies for Grownups Awards	Best Actress (TV/Streaming)	Cate Blanchett	Nominated	
2021	American Cinema Editors Awards	Best Edited Limited or Motion Picture for Television	Robert Komatsu (for "Phyllis")	Nominated	
2021	American Film Institute Awards	Television Programs of the Year	Mrs. America	Won	
2021	Costume Designers Guild Awards	Excellence in Period Television	Bina Daigeler (for "Shirley")	Nominated	
2021	Critics' Choice Awards	Best Movie/ Miniseries	Mrs. America	Nominated	
2021	Critics' Choice Awards	Best Actress in a Movie/ Miniseries	Cate Blanchett	Nominated	
2021	Critics' Choice Awards	Best Supporting Actress in a Movie/Miniseries	Uzo Aduba	Won	
2021	Critics' Choice Awards	Best Supporting Actress in a Movie/Miniseries	Margo Martindale	Nominated	
2021	Critics' Choice Awards	Best Supporting Actress in a Movie/Miniseries	Tracey Ullman	Nominated	
2021	Golden Globe Awards	Best Actress – Miniseries or TV Film	Cate Blanchett	Nominated	
2021	NAACP Image Awards	Outstanding Writing in a Drama Series	Tanya Barfield (for "Shirley")	Nominated	
2021	Satellite Awards	Best Miniseries	Mrs. America	Nominated	
2021	Satellite Awards	Best Actress - Miniseries or TV Film	Cate Blanchett	Won	
2021	Satellite Awards	Best Supporting Actress – TV	Tracey Ullman	Won	
2021	Screen Actors Guild Awards	Outstanding Female Actor in a Miniseries or TV Movie	Cate Blanchett	Nominated	
2021	Visual Effects Society Awards	Outstanding Supporting Visual Effects in a Photoreal Episode	Janelle Croshaw, Kaylie Whitcher, Leonardo Silva, Zena Bielewicz and Michael Innanen (for Shirley)	Nominated	
2021	Writers Guild of America Awards	Long Form – Original	Tanya Barfield, Joshua Allen Griffith, Sharon Hoffman, Boo Killebrew, Micah Schraft, April Shih and Dahvi Waller	Won	
