= Brenda Feigen =

American film producer

- Born: Brenda Sue Feigen; 1944 (age 81–82); Chicago, Illinois, U.S.
- Education: Vassar College (BA); Harvard University (JD)
- Occupations: Activist, producer, attorney
- Spouses: Marc Fasteau (m. 1968; div. 1987); Joanne Parrent (m. 2008)
- Children: 1

Brenda Feigen (born 1944) is an American feminist activist, film producer, and attorney.

== Early life and education ==
Brenda Sue Feigen was born in 1944 in Chicago, Illinois, to Arthur Paul Feigen, a lawyer, and Shirley Kadison, a housewife. Feigen graduated high school from the Latin School of Chicago in 1962 and graduated from Vassar College in the spring of 1966 cum laude and Phi Beta Kappa with a degree in math. Feigen credited her Vassar attendance with giving her "a welcome respite from the unrelenting anti-Semitism she faced in the private day school she attended in Chicago." She turned down an offer from a fully funded joint J.D./M.B.A. program at Columbia University, and chose instead to attend Harvard Law School. At Harvard, Feigen was one of only 32 women in her law school class of 565 students. Harvard proved to be a hostile place for the few women who attended. Feigen recounted that her property-law professor, A. James Casner—later the inspiration for the professor in the movie The Paper Chase—designated only one day a year to call on women in the class, which he dubbed "Ladies' Day."

In 1968, Feigen married Marc Fasteau, a Harvard Law classmate, in the Harvard Club of New York. She took the name Brenda Feigen Fasteau, and Marc later changed his to Marc Feigen Fasteau.

Just before walking down the aisle, Feigen spotted a "NO LADIES ALLOWED" sign on the Harvard Club of New York library wall. Feigen and her husband were appalled. They appealed to the Harvard Club of New York to allow women among its members, but the board voted to reject the proposal. The newlyweds soon launched a class action lawsuit against the Harvard Club for discriminating on the basis of sex. After five years of legal work, in the last conference before the trial was set to begin, a federal judge ordered the club to take one final vote. The next day, on January 11, 1973, the Club voted 2,097 to 695 to admit female members. Publicly, the Club's outgoing president, Albert H. Gordon, maintained that the vote was unconnected with the discrimination suit filed earlier in the year. Nevertheless, the decision marked a win for Feigen, who would come back together with her fellow plaintiffs in 2008 to celebrate the 35th anniversary of the success.

== Feminist activism and legal career ==
=== Legislative activism ===
In 1970, Feigen was elected National Legislative Vice President for the National Organization for Women (NOW). Though the organization had a 6-month membership eligibility requirement for elected positions, the requirement was waived for Feigen. During Feigen's tenure as national vice president, Democratic senator from Indiana Birch Bayh, chair of the US Senate Subcommittee on Constitutional Amendments, asked Feigen to coordinate the Senate testimony for the Equal Rights Amendment. Feigen coordinated the testimony of fellow NOW leaders and fellow activist Gloria Steinem, and testified herself on May 5, 1970. In March 1972, the law passed in the Senate, though it was ultimately not ratified by the requisite number of state legislatures. After the congressional hearings concluded, Feigen returned to New York and was hired as a litigation associate at the law firm Rosenman, Colin, Jaye, Petschek, Freund, and Emil. Feigen continued to serve as the national spokesperson for NOW, regularly appearing on Good Morning America.

Later in 1970, Steinem called Feigen to accompany her at Vassar's commencement, where Steinem had been asked to speak in her first major public address. The speech was titled "Living the Revolution", and in it Steinem advocated for a rejection of women's second-class status in society.

=== The Alliance ===
In 1972, Feigen left private practice, and she, Steinem, and Catherine Samuels founded The Women's Action Alliance. The mission of the Alliance was to provide resources to women, women's centers, and women's groups to combat and overcome sexism and sex discrimination. Letters poured in to the WAA to find "feminist psychologists, women lawyers, or doctors, or simply to learn how to bring the women's movement to their hometowns."

Steinem's idea for a newsletter for the Alliance eventually turned into Ms. Magazine. The initial meeting to discuss the idea with female journalists was held in Feigen's New York home. However, Feigen focused on the nonprofit, while Steinem took over the outreach through Ms. Magazine.

=== ACLU: Women's Rights Project ===
In 1972, Feigen joined Ruth Bader Ginsburg in co-directing the American Civil Liberties Union (ACLU)'s newly formed Women's Rights Project (WRP). Feigen's legal expertise and experience as the legislative vice president of NOW made her a prime candidate for the job, but she remained unsure as to whether or not she wanted to leave her position at Ms. Magazine. Eventually, with approval from Ms. Magazine co-founder Gloria Steinem, Feigen assumed her position at the ACLU. During her time at WRP, Brenda contributed to the establishment of heightened scrutiny for sex classifications under the Equal Protection Act. An interview with Feigen about this work is featured in the 2018 documentary RBG.

=== Fasteau and Feigen ===
In 1974, Feigen left the ACLU to take part in a law partnership with her husband, Marc Feigen Fasteau. The Partnership was a law firm called Fasteau and Feigen, located on Madison Avenue in New York City. Brenda and Marc planned to take on issues of gender, such as defending fathers who sought custody in divorces. Their notable cases include Ackerman v. Board of Education in 1974, where the Feigen Fasteaus defended Gary Ackerman, a father who sought paternity leave in New York City. Brenda was a partner at Fasteau and Feigen from 1974 to 1980.

== Political career ==
In 1978, Feigen ran for the Democratic nomination in the 26th District of the New York State Senate. Feigen ran against former superintendent of banks William Woodward III. Brenda took a leave of absence from Fasteau and Feigen in order to run her political campaign. She eventually lost the race by a slim margin of 3%. Woodward spent $600,000 on his campaign, and Feigen spent $38,000.

== Film career ==
=== William Morris Agency ===
In 1982, Feigen began working as a business affairs attorney at the William Morris Agency in New York. She eventually became a motion picture agent, a position which initiated her further involvement with the film industry. Some of her clients included producers, writers and talent, such as Jane Alexander, Karen Allen, Loretta Swit, and Mike Farrell.

=== Productions ===
In 1989, one of Feigen's writer clients introduced her to Chuck Pfarrer, an active Navy SEAL. Once Pfarrer retired, he expanded on his part-time interest in screenwriting and wrote a full screenplay for the film, Navy SEALS, which Feigen would produce. The team hired Richard Marquand as the director, and prepared for production. In 1987, however, Marquand's death halted all production. Lewis Teague was hired as Marquand's replacement, and by September 1989 filming commenced in Spain and Norfolk, Virginia. The film, which follows an elite Navy SEALS unit on a search and destroy mission, was made without any active Navy support because of "the top-secret nature of the SEAL's activities." The film was released in 1990 and was Feigen's first production.

Feigen also produced the TV show Comedy Lab in 1998 and the film The State of Eugenics in 2016.

Feigen gives frequent lectures on various motion picture and entertainment law topics. These include the role of the producer in motion pictures and TV, the roles of agents and attorneys, the content of different entertainment-related contracts, the deals for TV and motion picture writers, and contracts for authors and publishers.

== Feigen Law Group ==
Feigen founded the Feigen Law Group in 2001. The firm is based in Los Angeles and its practice areas include business transactions, employment contracts, anti-discrimination law, constitutional law, family law, environmental law, and an investigative division. Feigen also represents companies that need her services concerning mergers and acquisitions with and of other entertainment companies. Feigen is on the Executive Committee of the Beverly Hills Bar Association's Business Law Section.

== Published works ==
=== Memoir ===
In 2000, Feigen published her memoir, Not One of the Boys: Living Life as a Feminist, depicting the sexism she experienced throughout her life and legal career.

=== Articles ===
- Books Becoming Movies, ABA Entertainment Forum (2003)
- "Not On My Watch: Hollywood vs. the Future" by Peter Dekom and Peter Sealey, reviewed by Brenda Feigen, ABA Publication, Entertainment and Sports Lawyer Vol. 21, No. 4 (2004)
- Same Sex Marriage: An Issue of Constitutional Rights Not Moral Opinions, Vol. 27: Harvard Women's Law Journal (2004)
- Why "Milk" Matters: Proposition (8) Continues (2008)
- Proposition 8 Battle Just the Beginning for Gay Marriage Rights, wowOwow (2008)
- Who Is (Not) Passing the Buck On Gay Rights?, wowOwow (2009)
- Second-Class All the Way: Notes from a worn-down but still hopeful civil rights lawyer, wowOwow (2010)
- DOMA is Unconstitutional: An Authoritative Opinion, wowOwow (2010)
- Lesbians and Gays Finally Have the Right to Marry: Faith in Reason Returns, wowOwow (2010)
- Don’t Ask; Don’t Tell ("DADT")—An Update (2012)
- Here's to the 9th Circuit, wowOwow (2012)
- The Supremes and Same-Sex Marriage: Day 1 (2013)
- Prop 8 and DOMA (2013)
- The Supremes and Same-Sex Marriage: Day 2 (2013)
- Inside the Supreme Court's First Day of Marriage Equality Hearings (2013)
- Marriage Equality Cases (2015)

== Personal life ==
Feigen married Marc Fasteau in 1968. In 1974, the couple had a child, Alexis, who went on to graduate from UC Berkeley. In 1987, Fasteau and Feigen divorced. In 1990, she met her current partner, Joanne Parrent. They married in California in 2008, during the brief window of legal opportunity before Proposition 8 (temporarily) ended same-sex marriage in California. Feigen currently resides in California.

== In popular culture ==
In the 2020 television mini-series Mrs. America she is portrayed by Ari Graynor.

== Awards and honors ==
- Honorary President's Follow at Columbia University (1978)
- Director of "Entertainment Goes Global"
- Speaker at Harvard Law School's Celebration 40 and Celebration 50 (40th/ 50th anniversary of the first female graduating class)
- Speaker at the Twyman Creative Los Angeles Film Conference (2005)
- Board of California Lawyers for the Arts and Population Media Center
- Member of the Association of American Screenwriters
- Chair of the Board of the National Breast Cancer Education and Legal Center
