= Marc Fasteau =

American businessman, attorney, author and political advocate

- Born: Marc Steven Fasteau; August 28, 1942 (age 83); Washington, D.C.
- Education: Harvard University (BA); Harvard Law School (JD)
- Occupation: investor
- Notable work: The Male Machine (1974)
- Spouse: Brenda Feigen (m. 1968; div. 1987)
- Children: 1

Marc Steven Fasteau is an American businessman, attorney, author, and political advocate.

== Personal life ==
Marc Steven Fasteau was born in Washington, D.C. Fasteau graduated from Harvard College in 1963 and, in 1969 from Harvard Law School magna cum laude where he was an editor of the Harvard Law Review. From 1963 to 1966, Fasteau served on the professional staffs of the US Senate Majority Leader Mike Mansfield, the United States House Banking and Currency Committee (now Financial Services) and the Joint Economic Committee of Congress.

Fasteau is currently married to Anne Gerard Fredericks, an artist, art historian and former Wall Street professional specializing in the Japanese and other non-US equity markets. He has a daughter, named Alexis, born in 1974, from his previous marriage to Brenda Feigen, which lasted from 1968 to 1987.

== Career ==
=== Business ventures ===
Fasteau served as staff director and counsel to a Rockefeller Foundation commission on US policy toward South Africa

Fasteau was an investment banker in New York for 14 years, most recently as the Managing director and partner at Dillon, Read & Co.

Fasteau went on to found the American Strategic Insurance Group, an AA+ rated property and casualty insurance group, which he served as Chairman of the board. The insurance group was sold to Progressive Insurance in 2015.

Fasteau was an investor and partner in Sereno Properties, the developer and owner of hotels in St Barts and on Lake Como, Italy. A controlling interest in Sereno properties was sold to private equity firm KSL Capital Partners in 2023.

Fasteau is an investor in and serves on the board of directors of Oxford Performance Materials, Inc., an advanced materials 3-D printing company that manufactures FDA-approved replacement vertebrae, eye sockets and other in-body bony structures from a high performance polymer.

== Other activities ==
Fasteau is the co-author of Industrial Policy for the United States: Winning the International Competition for Good Jobs and High-Value Industries, to be published by Cambridge University Press in spring 2024.

He is a member of the board and a Vice Chairman of the Coalition for a Prosperous America, a non-partisan organization representing labor, manufacturers and farmers that advocates for U.S. leadership in manufacturing.

Fasteau is the author of The Male Machine (1974) that argues that the overly macho, John Wayne idea of masculinity is destructive in both personal and public life. It makes the case specifically that the US remained in the Vietnam War longer than it otherwise would because this paradigm led US leaders to overestimate the international and domestic political costs of losing the war.

== In media ==
Fasteau was portrayed by Adam Brody in Mrs. America.
