= Dorothy Pitman Hughes =

American feminist activist (1938–2022)

- Born: Dorothy Jean Ridley; October 2, 1938; Lumpkin, Georgia, U.S.
- Died: December 1, 2022 (aged 84); Tampa, Florida, U.S.
- Known for: Co-founder of the Women's Action Alliance
- Movement: Feminism
- Children: 3
- Relatives: Alice Tan Ridley (sister); Gabourey Sidibe (niece)

Dorothy Pitman Hughes (born Dorothy Jean Ridley; October 2, 1938 – December 1, 2022) was an American feminist, child welfare advocate, activist, public speaker, author, and small business owner. Pitman Hughes co-founded the Women's Action Alliance. Her activism and friendship with Gloria Steinem was a noted example of racial balance in the nascent feminist movement.

== Family and early life ==
Dorothy Jean Ridley was born on October 2, 1938, in Lumpkin, Georgia, to Lessie W. Ridley and Melton Lee Ridley. When Ridley was ten years old, her father was beaten and left for dead on the family's doorstep; the family believes it to be a crime committed by Ku Klux Klan members. In response to her family's experiences, Ridley decided as a child to devote her life to improving the circumstances of people through activism.

== Early career ==
Ridley moved from Georgia to New York City in 1957, when she was nineteen. There she and her siblings sang in the group "Roger and the Ridley Sisters." Through the 1960s in New York, she worked as a salesperson, house cleaner, and nightclub singer. She began her activism by raising bail money for civil rights protesters. Ridley married Bill Pitman and they had a child before divorcing. Then Pitman met and married Clarence Hughes.

In the late 1960s, needing care for her own children (by 1970, she had three daughters) Pitman Hughes organized a multiracial cooperative day care center on the West Side, the West 80th Community Childcare Center, which would be profiled by New York magazine columnist Gloria Steinem. Pitman Hughes and Steinem became friends. Pitman Hughes, who was comfortable on stage, encouraged Steinem to begin speaking in public with her about the Women's Movement. The two of them traveled around the country for two years, sharing the stage. Based on the publicity the duo received, Pitman Hughes encouraged Steinem to found a female-operated media source, Ms. Magazine, with other partners, beginning as a special edition of New York. Although she is widely cited as co-founder, Pitman Hughes had no formal role at the magazine.

== Middle career ==
Pitman Hughes organized the first shelter for battered women in New York City and co-founded the New York City Agency for Child Development, pioneering child-care and noting that "too many women were being forced to leave their children home alone while they worked to feed their families". Pitman Hughes also co-founded with Gloria Steinem the Women's Action Alliance, a pioneering national information center that specialized in nonsexist, multiracial children's education, in 1971. The two women toured together speaking about race, class and gender throughout the 1970s.

Pitman Hughes and Steinem are pictured together in an iconic black and white photograph, now part of the National Portrait Gallery collection, Smithsonian Institution, Washington D.C. Taken by photographer Dan Wynn for Esquire Magazine and published in October 1971, Wynn captured Steinem and Pitman Hughes signaling their feminist solidarity by raising their fists in the raised-fist salute first popularized by members of the Black Power movement. Pitman Hughes noted the unlikely nature of their friendship at the time, admitting the terror she felt of being seen in public with a white woman in her hometown of Lumpkin, Georgia, when Steinem would visit. In 2013, Ms. Pitman Hughes commissioned photographer Dan Bagan to create an homage portrait of the two friends together again in a similar pose for Ms. Steinem's 80th birthday.

In 1972, Pitman Hughes was a signer of the Ms. campaign "We Have Had Abortions" which called for an end to "archaic laws" limiting reproductive freedom, they encouraged women to share their stories and take action.

== Later career ==
Pitman Hughes was a guest lecturer at Columbia University, taught a course called "The Dynamics of Change" at the College of New Rochelle, and was a guest lecturer at City College, Manhattan.

In 1992, Pitman Hughes co-founded the Charles Junction Historic Preservation Society in Jacksonville, Florida, using the former Junction homestead to combat poverty through community gardening and food production.

In 1997 Pitman Hughes became the first African-American woman to own an office supply/copy center, Harlem Office Supply, Inc., and to become a member of the Stationers Association of New York (SANY). In May 1997, Pitman Hughes began to offer HOS stock at $1.00 a share to individuals, corporations, partnerships and non-profit organizations focused on African-American children. She wrote about her experiences in Wake Up and Smell the Dollars! (2000), advocating small business ownership to other African Americans as a form of empowerment.

Pitman Hughes was involved in the Upper Manhattan Empowerment Zone (UMEZ), a federal program instituted by the Clinton administration in 1994 designating $300 million of federal, state, and city money for the economic development of Harlem. Pitman Hughes opened Harlem Office Supply. However Pitman Hughes later became a critic, when a Staples store opened nearby and her business was forced to close. The programs brought large businesses like Old Navy and Disney into Harlem to create jobs but ultimately created more competition for locally owned businesses. "Some are convinced that empowering large corporations to provide low paying jobs for our residents will bring economic empowerment to the community.... [But] without African-American ownership, there is ultimately no local empowerment" stated Pitman Hughes, believing resources were being unevenly distributed among small businesses in Harlem. Pitman Hughes later wrote Just Saying... It Looks Like Ethnic Cleansing (The Gentrification of Harlem) providing advice to African American business owners who might want to utilize similar government programs such as the JOBS Act, signed into law by U.S. President Barack Obama in 2012.

Pitman Hughes and Steinem spoke again in 2008 at Eckerd College where they reenacted their raised fist pose together. Steinem partnered in Pitman Hughes' efforts in the Northside community of Jacksonville, Florida, to combat hunger with community gardens, by appearing as a speaker and funding support.

== Personal life and death ==
Pitman Hughes's first marriage to Bill Pitman ended in divorce; she later married Clarence Hughes, who predeceased her. She was the mother of three daughters, sister of the singer Alice Tan Ridley and the aunt of actress Gabourey Sidibe.

On December 1, 2022, Pitman Hughes died at the home of her family in Tampa, Florida, at age 84.

== Honors ==
Oprah Winfrey honored Pitman Hughes as one of America's "Great Moms".

== In popular culture ==
Janelle Monaé portrayed Pitman Hughes in the 2020 film The Glorias.

== Works ==
- Life Is About Choices, Not Excuses: The Life of Ruther Youmans Tyson (2014). Jacksonville, Fla.: DPH Book Publishing. ISBN 978-0985364113 (as editor).
- I'm Just Saying, It looks Like Ethnic Cleansing: The Gentrification of Harlem (2012). Jacksonville, Fla.: DPH Book Publishing. ISBN 9780985364106.
- Wake Up and Smell the Dollars! Whose Inner-City Is this Anyway!: One Woman's Struggle Against Sexism, Classism, Racism, Gentrification, and the Empowerment Zone (2000). Phoenix, AZ: Amber Books. ISBN 9780965506472.
