= The Glorias =

2020 American biopic by Julie Taymor

- Official poster
- Directed by: Julie Taymor
- Screenplay by: Julie Taymor; Sarah Ruhl
- Based on: My Life on the Road by Gloria Steinem
- Produced by: Julie Taymor; Lynn Hendee; Alex Saks
- Starring: Julianne Moore; Alicia Vikander; Timothy Hutton; Lorraine Toussaint; Janelle Monáe; Bette Midler
- Cinematography: Rodrigo Prieto
- Edited by: Sabine Hoffman
- Music by: Elliot Goldenthal
- Production companies: Page Fifty-Four Pictures; Artemis Rising Foundation
- Distributed by: Roadside Attractions; LD Entertainment
- Release dates: January 26, 2020 (Sundance); September 30, 2020 (United States)
- Running time: 147 minutes
- Country: United States
- Language: English
- Budget: $20 million
- Box office: $30,940

The Glorias is a 2020 American biographical drama film directed and produced by Julie Taymor, from a screenplay by Taymor and Sarah Ruhl. The film is based upon My Life on the Road by Gloria Steinem, who is played by four actresses, representing her life at different ages. It stars Julianne Moore as Steinem, with Alicia Vikander portraying a younger Steinem, from ages 20 to 40, Lulu Wilson portraying a teenage Steinem, and Ryan Kiera Armstrong as Steinem when she was a child. The cast also includes Lorraine Toussaint, Janelle Monáe, and Bette Midler.

The Glorias had its world premiere at the Sundance Film Festival on January 26, 2020, and was released on September 30, 2020, by Roadside Attractions and LD Entertainment.

== Plot ==
A Greyhound bus filled with variations of Gloria Steinem of all ages drives along the road. The Glorias begin to reminisce about the past. As a young child, Gloria is charmed by her father, an antique salesman whose 'make do' attitude aggravates her mother. A few years later, her parents are separated and a young Gloria is forced to be her mother's caretaker as she falls into a deep depression. To her surprise she finds various articles written with a male byline that her mother reveals were written by her before she was married.

As a young woman, Gloria travels to India on a fellowship. Returning to America she seeks out jobs as a journalist and, despite casual sexism and harassment, manages to succeed writing articles on fashion and dating. After writing an exposé on the poor working conditions of the waitresses working at the Playboy Club, Steinem's name is made. However she feels ashamed by the continued degradation of her work and turns down an offer to turn her article into a book.

Shortly after, Gloria's father is injured in a car accident. Arriving to see him a week after the accident she learns he has died and feels immense guilt that she delayed her visitation out of fear she would have to become his caretaker as she once was for her mother.

While attending the March on Washington to write a profile of James Baldwin, her discussions with a black woman open her mind to the prejudice faced by black women in America and to her own complicity as a white woman. She later attends a speak-out event on illegal abortion that causes her to reflect on her own abortion which she had in London shortly before her fellowship. Moved by the stories of other women and knowing that magazines will not allow her to write the stories she wants, Gloria moves towards activism and befriends Dorothy Pitman Hughes and Florynce Kennedy, two black women who teach her about public speaking and activism.

In the early 1970s, Gloria and her friends publish their magazine Ms. in order to finally be able to talk about subjects they want. In the first issue, Gloria, along with 52 other famous women, publicly admits to having had an illegal abortion.

Gloria begins to move further into politics by campaigning for Bella Abzug. At the National Women's Political Caucus, Gloria and other women in various movements fight to establish the Equal Rights Amendment. The amendment ultimately fails.

Gloria continues to advocate, speak, and campaign despite being continually plagued by opposition to her pro-choice stance and questions about her marital status and lack of children. At the age of 66, she marries for the first time only to become widowed shortly after.

In 2016, she writes an article about the devastating effect of Hillary Clinton's loss during the 2016 United States presidential election. It is then revealed that the Greyhound bus is filled with protestors headed to the 2017 Women's March with the real-life Gloria Steinem on board. Footage from the 2017 Women's March, including the real Steinem's speech as well as footage from around the world is shown.

== Cast ==
- Julianne Moore as Gloria Steinem
  - Alicia Vikander as young Gloria
  - Lulu Wilson as teen Gloria
  - Ryan Kiera Armstrong as child Gloria
- Bette Midler as Bella Abzug
- Janelle Monáe as Dorothy Pitman Hughes
- Timothy Hutton as Leo Steinem
- Lorraine Toussaint as Florynce Kennedy
- Enid Graham as Ruth
- Kimberly Guerrero as Wilma Mankiller
- Monica Sanchez as Dolores Huerta
- Margo Moorer as Barbara Jordan
- Jay Huguley as TV Interviewer
- Michael Lowry as Sexist Studio Interviewer

== Production ==
It was announced in October 2018 that a biopic of the activist Gloria Steinem was in production, with Julie Taymor directing along with co-writing the screenplay. Four actresses were cast to play Steinem at various points in her life, with Alicia Vikander cast to play her from ages 20 to 40, and Julianne Moore playing her beyond 40. Bette Midler was cast later that month. Lulu Wilson was cast in November. In December, Janelle Monáe was cast to play Dorothy Pitman Hughes. In January 2019, it was announced Timothy Hutton and Lorraine Toussaint had joined the cast of the film.

Filming began in January 2019 in Savannah, Georgia.

== Release ==
It had its world premiere at the Sundance Film Festival on January 26, 2020. Shortly after, Roadside Attractions and LD Entertainment acquired distribution rights to the film. Originally scheduled for a theatrical release on September 25, 2020, the film was released on Prime Video in the United States and Canada on September 30 that year.

== Critical reception ==
On Rotten Tomatoes, the film holds an approval rating of 68% based on 134 reviews, with an average rating of 6.2/10. The site's critical consensus reads "Uneven yet engaging, The Glorias honors the work of a pivotal American activist without quite capturing her trailblazing spirit." On Metacritic, the film holds a rating of 58 out of 100, based on 29 critics, indicating "mixed or average" reviews.

Katie Walsh of The Los Angeles Times gave the film a positive review writing, "Using every tool at her disposal, Taymor crafts an epic tapestry of a remarkable life, paying tribute to the glorious Gloria Steinem." Christy Lemire of RogerEbert.com also gave the film a positive review writing: "Just when you think she's heading into cliched territory, Taymor mixes it up, plays with structure, and subverts your expectations." Jen Chaney of New York Magazine gave the film a negative review writing: "With a runtime of two and a half hours, it lasts too long and doesn't go deeply enough to register the way it should." Brian Lowry of CNN also gave the film a negative review writing: "The key performances are strong, but director/co-writer Julie Taymor's movie meanders too much, dragging through the beginning and again toward the end."
