= Women's Action Alliance =

American feminist organization

- Abbreviation: WAA
- Formation: 1971
- Founder: Gloria Steinem; Brenda Feigen; Dorothy Pitman Hughes
- Dissolved: 1997
- Services: National Women's Agenda (NWA); Non-Sexist Childhood Development Initiative (NSCDI); Women's Alcohol and Drug Education Project (WADEP); Women With Non-Traditional Occupations; Children of Single Parents in the Schools
- Fields: Feminist Movement in the United States
- Board Chair: Gloria Steinem (1971–1978); Joan Shigekawa (1978–?); Catherine Samuels; Kay Ellen Consolver (?–1997)
- Executive Director: Brenda Feigen Fasteau (1971-72); Grace Helen McCabe (1972-73); Marlene Krauss (1973-74); Ruth J. Abram (1974-79); Arlie Scott (1979-82); Sylvia Kramer (1982-91); Shazia Rafi (1991-93); Karel R. Amarath (1993-97)
- Board of directors: Bella Abzug; Shirley Chisholm; Marlene Krauss; Gloria Steinem; Joan Shigekawa; Catherine Samuels; Kay Ellen Consolver
- Publication: Women's Action Almanac: A Complete Resource Guide

The Women's Action Alliance (WAA), or simply the Alliance, was a feminist organization in the United States which was active from 1971 to 1997. It was founded by Gloria Steinem, Brenda Feigen Fasteau and Dorothy Pitman-Hughes. The board of directors of the WAA included several notable feminists such as Bella Abzug and Shirley Chisholm. The WAA's mission was to assist local activists through technical and communications support and through them, to create change on a national scale.

The group created a network of feminist activists, coordinated resources, and led initiatives on a number of issues. The WAA helped to raise discussion for a national agenda of feminist legislation, developed strategies for countering gender stereotypes in developmental education, and helped open the first battered women's shelters.

== History ==
The Women's Action Alliance (WAA) was established in 1971 during the Feminist Movement in the United States. It was founded by Gloria Steinem, Brenda Feigen Fasteau and Dorothy Pitman Hughes, who combined their legacies in the civil rights movement to forge a network of activists dedicated to a vision of equality for all women. Its founding mission was to assist women by coordinating resources and bringing together individuals working at the grassroots level onto a broader national scale. Its founders intended to build on the previous success of the women's movement to effect further change in society's recognition and treatment of women. The WAA's goal was, according to the founders, to help the "large numbers of women who want to change their lot in life" by becoming a clearinghouse of women's information.

Gloria Steinem chaired the board from 1971 to 1978. Among many other contributions, the WAA helped to open the first battered women's shelters. The WAA was dissolved in 1997 due to lack of funding.

== Initiatives ==
The WAA attempted to connect women who wanted to "change their lot in life" with community organizations and professionals interested in feminist causes. Many early correspondences to the WAA asked for referrals to organizations that assisted women. Some asked for recommendations for female or feminist professionals (psychologists, lawyers, doctors, etc.). Others requested information about starting local feminist organizations or chapters. Referrals provided in response to these requests to the WAA were gathered by individual women using their connections in the community to network, collect and disseminate information, and recommend professionals and organizations with which they had positive experiences.

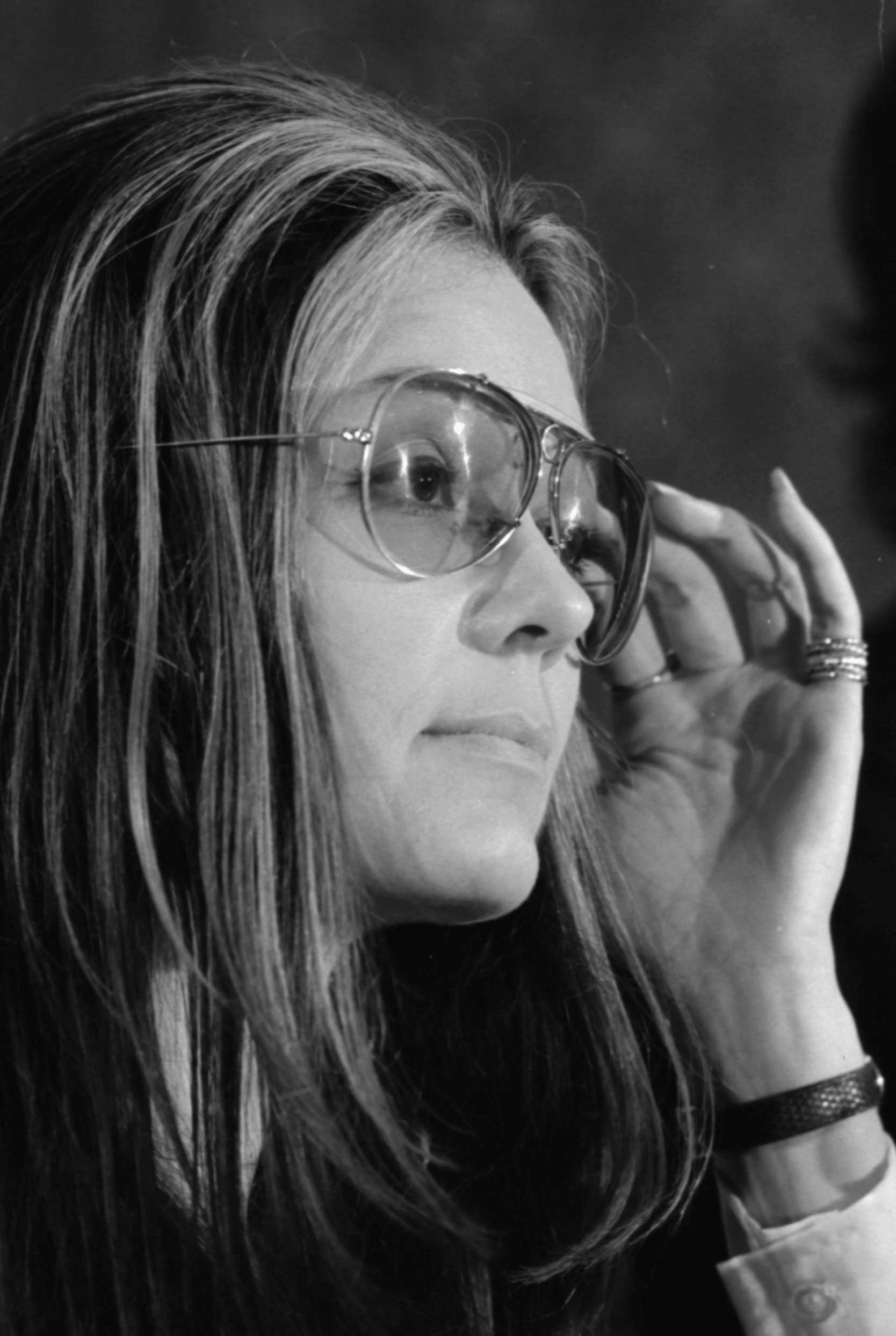
Gloria Steinem at a Women's Action Alliance news conference on January 12, 1972

=== National Women's Agenda ===
In January 1975, President Gerald Ford founded the National Commission on the Observance of International Women's Year, or the IWY Commission. This commission was tasked with "encouraging cooperative activity in the field of women's rights and responsibilities". Many groups including the National Organization for Women (NOW) were dissatisfied, and were concerned that the commission was too cautious. This led the WAA to create the National Women's Agenda (NWA), a national agenda for feminist legislation.

The WAA consulted with many organizations, 70 of which responded by May 1975 and 24 ultimately participated in creating the NWA. It advocated for many different causes and problems women and marginalized peoples faced. The agenda called on fair representation in government and other areas, the end to racial and cultural stereotyping, recognition of working women and homemakers as workers, and advocated for the causes of women in poverty, women affected by the criminal justice system, and bodily autonomy and integrity.

In total, 94 women's groups and labor unions joined the coalition. Some of these organizations include: American Association of University Women, National Federation of Business and Professional Women's Clubs, Planned Parenthood, National Association of Social Workers, Women's International League for Peace and Freedom, National Coalition of American Nuns, Women Strike for Peace, YWCA, Amalgamated Clothing Workers, American Federation of State, County and Municipal Employees, National Organization for Women (NOW), National Abortion Rights Action League, National Women's Political Caucus, The Feminist Press, Women's Legal Defense Fund, National Gay Task Force, Lesbian Feminist Liberation, Mattachine Society and National Congress of Neighborhood Women.

The NWA was eventually overshadowed by the National Plan of Action (the Plan) created by the 1977 National Women's Conference in Houston. The Houston plan had more "expansive" language and had more emphasis on minority women and abortion, while the NWA was more "terse" and had a clearer statement on welfare and health care. The National Women's Agenda Project collapsed in 1980.

=== Non-Sexist Childhood Development Initiative ===
The Non-Sexist Childhood Development Initiative was designed by the WAA to combat perceived sexism in preschools. The project was founded because of a number of letters the group received which expressed concerns regarding gender roles and gender conformity in preschools. The program received funding from a number of different foundations.

To investigate sex-role conditioning, the WAA created programs to address sexism in preschools. In the fall of 1973, the initiative, under the directorship of Barbara Sprung, launched the program in four childhood education centers in New York.

The program focused on four main activities: Teachers and school staff were instructed on harmful stereotypes that were being taught, raising their awareness to recognize such issues. Parents were educated on how sex-role stereotyping was harmful. A curriculum was developed to help children understand that men and women do all kinds of work inside and outside the home. The program also developed non-sexist multi-racial learning materials, toys and books. The WAA also developed of a curriculum guide, authored by director Barbara Sprung, called Non-Sexist Education for Young Children: A Practical Guide. This was the first non-sexist early education material for the classroom.

In the 80s with increasing public attention to the role of technology in society, the focus shifted to computer and science education. The program was renamed the Gender Equity in Education Program. With funding from the National Science Foundation, the Ford Foundation, and Apple, several nationwide projects were carried out that aimed to counteract girls' underrepresentation in computer and science classes in high school. The Computer Equity Training Project, working with computer teachers across the country, was the first such effort undertaken anywhere and increased girls' computer participation 144%. The Computer Equity Expert Project worked with university teacher educators in technology and science nationwide, and enabled thousands of new teachers to encourage girls in computer and science classes. These and other projects were led by Jo Sanders.

=== Women's Alcohol and Drug Education Project ===
In the 1970s, most substance rehabilitation and preventive programs were predominantly for white men with health insurance. The National Institute on Alcohol Abuse and Alcoholism (NIAAA) awarded 40 grants for treatment programs specifically for women. However, due to blocked state grants in 1981, the programs like the WAA's Women's Alcohol and Drug Education Project were not funded until the late 1980s.

Established in 1987, the WAA's Women's Alcohol and Drug Education Project addressed the need for substance abuse help for women, especially women of color and those in poverty. Paula Roth, director of the project in 1990, wrote Alcohol and Drugs Are Women's Issues. Its two volumes aimed to start a new conversation about substance abuse affecting minority women and poor women and to highlight substance abuse by women as "critical women's issues".

The project created model programs in six women's centers across the United States, integrating an alcohol and drug component with the work being done with women at the facilities. Prevention was made a priority in addition to intervention. Substance abuse was put in the context of women's issues, because it was believed that information regarding substance abuse wouldn't reach women in poverty.

=== Women's Action Almanac ===
In 1979, the WAA published Women's Action Almanac: A Complete Resource Guide. It was a guidebook of women's issues and programs, organized by subject and included lists of women's organizations. The book was written and compiled by the WAA, and edited by Jane Williamson, Diane Winston and Wanda Wooten. The almanac was inspired by letters the WAA received seeking advice or information, demonstrating the need for a comprehensive directory of resources and services for women.

=== Others ===
In response to positive feedback, the WAA created its Beginning Equal program, which was similar to the Non-Sexist Childhood Development Initiative. Other projects included Women With Non-Traditional Occupations and Children of Single Parents in the Schools. The WAA created a program called Computer Equity, which gathered data used to encourage girls to become more comfortable with technology. Later programs, like the Teenage Pregnancy Prevention project, branched out into healthcare and gathered data and information by surveying the agencies included.

== The Sophia Smith Collection of WAA archives ==
The WAA received a large number of letters and generated a large amount of correspondence. There are 117.25 feet of records (over 300 boxes) located at the Sophia Smith Collection in Northampton, Massachusetts. This is the collection's largest processed archive to date. The letters document the history of the organization from its inception until its disbandment.
