= The Male Machine =

1974 book by Marc Fasteau

- 1st edition cover of The Male Machine (1974)
- Author: Marc Fasteau
- Language: English
- Subject: Social science
- Publisher: McGraw-Hill
- Publication date: September 1, 1974
- Publication place: United States
- Media type: Print (Hardcover and Paperback)
- Pages: 225
- ISBN: 978-0070199859

The Male Machine is a book by Marc Fasteau written during the second-wave of feminism in the United States. It was published on September 1, 1974, by McGraw-Hill.

The book examined the damaging gender expectations faced by men. Drawing upon personal insights and experiences, the author explores myths about masculinity and their destructive impact on society.

== Release ==
The book was published on September 1, 1974, and had its third printing by December 1974. The book received both a hardcover and paperback release. The book is currently out of print.

== Reception ==
The book was heavily applauded upon release by feminist publications such as Ms. magazine, whose co-founder Gloria Steinem hailed Fasteau as "spy in the ranks of the white male elite" and declared him and the men's liberation movement "the revolution’s other half". But the book received less favorable criticism outside of the feminist circle. Larry McMurtry of The New York Times said, "The analysis [in the book] is sometimes keen and always heartfelt, but a certain fevered urgency blurs the tone."

== See also ==
- Men's rights movement
- Men's movement
- Fathers' rights movement
