= Entertainment and Sports Lawyer =

- Discipline: Law
- Language: English
- Edited by: Vered N. Yakovee

Publication details
- Publisher: American Bar Association (United States)

Standard abbreviations
- ISO 4: Entertain. Sports Lawyer

Indexing
- ISSN: 0732-1880
- OCLC no.: 474133473

Links
- Journal homepage

Entertainment and Sports Lawyer is a law review published by the Forum on the Entertainment and Sports Industries of the American Bar Association. It is aimed at lawyers who specialize in entertainment and sports. It is published quarterly.
